= Luigi Durand de la Penne =

Italian admiral (1914–1992)

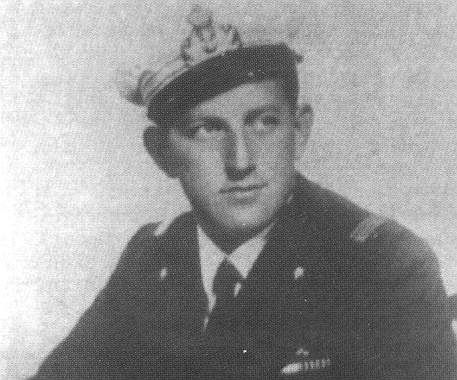
- Born: 11 February 1914; Genoa, Italy
- Died: 17 January 1992 (aged 77); Genoa, Italy
- Military career
- Allegiance: Kingdom of Italy; Italian Republic
- Branch: Regia Marina (Italy) Marina Militare
- Service years: 1934–1956
- Rank: Admiral
- Unit: Decima Mas
- Conflicts: Italo-Ethiopian War; World War II: Raid on Alexandria
- Awards: Gold Medal of Military Valour
- Other work: Member of Italian Parliament

Marquis Luigi Durand de la Penne (11 February 1914 – 17 January 1992) was an Italian Navy admiral who served as naval diver in the Decima MAS during World War II. He was born in Genoa, where he also died.

Durand de la Penne graduated from the Italian Naval Academy in Livorno in 1934. He joined the I Flottiglia MAS in 1935.

== Iride submarine crew rescue action ==
On 22 August 1940, in the Gulf of Bomba, the Italian submarine Iride, being a human torpedo carrier, was sunk by a torpedo released by a British Fairey Swordfish bomber. The air attack happened during an exercise, in shallow water, when four human torpedo squads were around, including officers Teseo Tesei and Luigi Durand de la Penne. The divers were able to make an immediate rescue action. Of the 12 Iride crewmen who survived, two died during an unsuccessful attempt to surface, nine were retrieved alive (two of them died soon, due to wounds), and one was too shocked to leave the sunken submarine. De la Penne tried to persuade him to surface and even gave him his own aqualung, but the seaman refused to surface and died.

== Sinking of Valiant ==
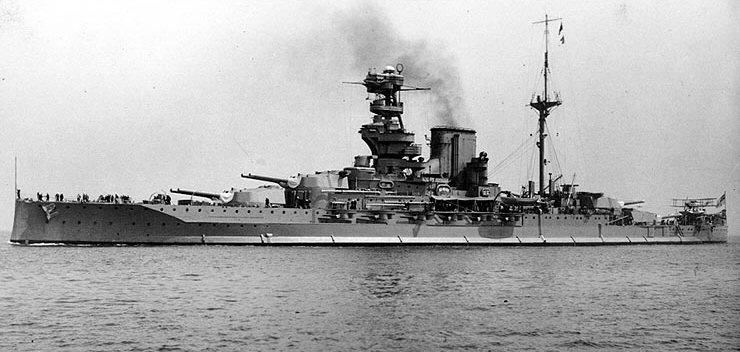
HMS Valiant

As part of a team of divers, he took part in human torpedo attacks against Allied ships in the Mediterranean. In December 1941, he was one of a team of six (Emilio Bianchi, his second; Antonio Marceglia with Spartaco Schergat; Vincenzo Martellotta with Mario Marino) that attacked Alexandria harbour. They used an Italian human torpedo known as S.L.C. (Siluro Lenta Corsa, also known as "maiale"), actually a small underwater assault vehicle with a crew of two. As a result, four ships were disabled: the Royal Navy battleships HMS Queen Elizabeth (by Marceglia and Schergat) and HMS Valiant (by Martellotta and Marino), the oil tanker Sagona and the destroyer HMS Jervis. De la Penne personally placed the limpet mine under the hull of Valiant.

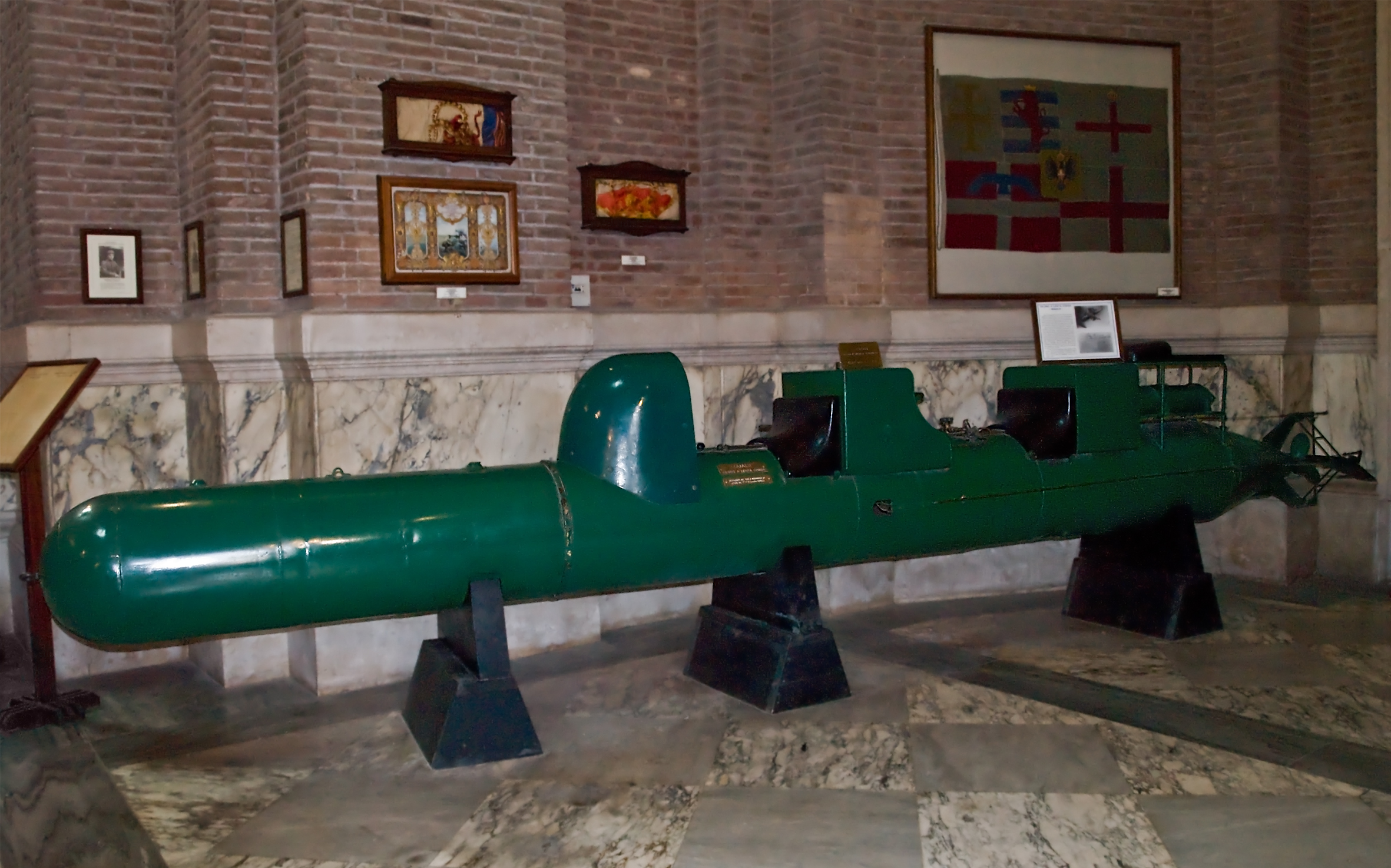
A Human Torpedo SLC or "Maiale", exhibited in the Museo Sacrario delle Bandiere delle Forze Armate, in Rome, Italy.

Of the three teams of frogmen, only de la Penne and Bianchi were captured before the devices exploded. The other two teams were able to get to the coast, but they were captured the day after in Alexandria. As de la Penne refused to inform the captain of Valiant, Charles Eric Morgan, of the mines, he and his mate were confined in a cell under-deck, actually in a place just above where the mine had been placed.

A few minutes before the detonation, De la Penne informed Captain Morgan of the imminent explosion, in order to allow him to evacuate the ship, but continued to refuse to disclose where the mine had been placed. The two frogmen were immediately sent back to their confinement place. A few minutes later, the mine exploded. Although hurt by the explosion, the frogmen reached the deck of Valiant just in time to see the other mines explode under Queen Elizabeth, Sagona and Jervis.

Although both ships settled on the sea bed, their decks were still clear of the waterline. As all six frogmen were eventually captured and both vessels appeared to be operational, the success of the attack in neutralising the targeted ships became known by the Italian Navy only after some days. For this action, de la Penne was awarded the Gold Medal of Military Valour, the Italian military's highest military decoration awarded for valour "in the face of the enemy". In May 1945, at the end of the war, Morgan, by now at the rank of admiral, asked if he could himself confer the medal on de la Penne in a ceremony in Taranto; which he did.

== With the Allies in La Spezia ==
After the 8 September 1943 Armistice, de la Penne was offered the opportunity to be released from prison and fight for the Allies. He accepted and returned to duty as a frogman.

On 22 June 1944, he participated in a joint Italian/British operation against the Germans. A team formed of British and Italian divers was transported by the Italian destroyer Grecale in an attack on La Spezia harbour, at the time in German hands. They sank the cruisers Gorizia and Bolzano before they could be used to block the harbour entrance.

== Post-war career ==
After the war, Durand de la Penne stayed in the Marina Militare. He was promoted to Capitano di Fregata (Commander) in 1950 and Capitano di Vascello (Captain) in 1954. In 1956 he was appointed as naval attaché in Brazil. He was also Deputy of the Parliament of Italy for the second through the sixth legislatures as an independent candidate. He retired with the rank of Ammiraglio di Squadra (Admiral).

In the 1962 film The Valiant he was played by Ettore Manni.

In his honour, the Marina Militare (Italian Navy) named its new series of destroyers of 1993 as the Durand de la Penne class. Two vessels were launched: the lead ship, Luigi Durand de la Penne and Francesco Mimbelli.
