= Spartaco Schergat =

Italian military frogman (1920–1996)

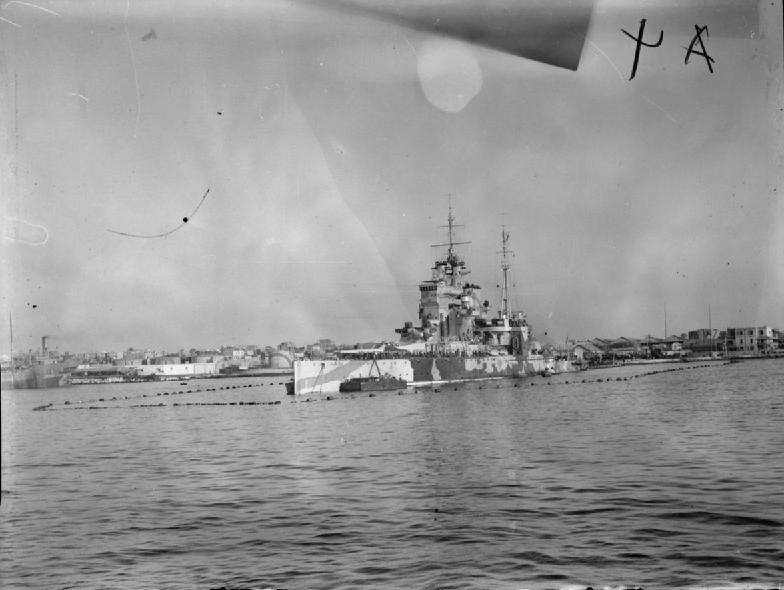
Spartaco Schergat damaged HMS Queen Elizabeth in Alexandria harbour in 1941

Spartaco Schergat (1920 in Koper – 1996 in Trieste) was an Italian military frogman during World War II.

== Biography ==
Schergat was born in Istria to an Italian irredentist. He voluntarily joined the Regia Marina in 1940. He was friends with Luigi Durand de la Penne, who enrolled him in the elite Decima MAS (XMAS).

In 1941, during the Raid on Alexandria, Schergat severely damaged the British battleship Queen Elizabeth, with a human torpedo. For this military action, he received the Italian gold medal in the Second World War.

From 1943 until the end of the war, Schergat collaborated with the Allies, via the Royal Navy of the Badoglio government in southern Italy.

In the 1950s, Schergat was elected as deputy of MSI, an Italian far-right party.

In 1996 Spartaco Schergat died, after a long struggle with cancer, in Trieste.

== The attack on Queen Elizabeth ==
As part of a team of divers of the X MAS he took part in the human torpedo attacks on British vessels in the Mediterranean. In December 1941, Schergat was one of a team of six (Luigi Durand de la Penne with Emilio Bianchi; Antonio Marceglia with Spartaco Schergat; Vincenzo Martellotta with Mario Marino) which attacked Alexandria harbour. They used the new Italian secret torpedo S.L.C. ("Siluro Lenta Corsa", also known as "maiale"), a small underwater assault vehicle with a crew of two. As a result, four ships were damaged in Alexandria: the British battleships Queen Elizabeth (by Marceglia and Schergat) and Valiant (by Durand de la Penne and Bianchi), and the tanker Sagona with the destroyer Jervis. (by Martellotta and Marino). Spartaco Schergat personally placed the limpet mine under the hull of Queen Elizabeth.

However, the two capital ships were in shallow water, Queen Elizabeth settling on the sea bed, Valiant down by the bow, but both maintained the illusion from the air that they were undamaged. Temporary repairs were quickly effected; Queen Elizabeth was sent to the United States for permanent full repairs, Valiant to Durban, South Africa. Both ships were out of action for over one year.

This represented a dramatic change of fortunes against the Allies from the strategic point of view in the central Mediterranean Sea during the next half-year or more. The Italian fleet - with the Alexandria Raid - had nominally achieved naval supremacy in the Mediterranean Sea, called in that year Italy's Mare Nostrum by fascist propaganda.

== See also ==
- Istrian Italians

== Bibliography ==
- "Frogmen First Battles" by retired U.S. Captain William Schofield's book. ISBN 0-8283-2088-8
- The Italian Navy in World War II by Marc'Antonio Bragadin, United States Naval Institute, Annapolis, 1957. ISBN 0-405-13031-7
- The Italian Navy during World War II by Sadkovich, James, Greenwood Press, Westport, 1994. ISBN 0-313-28797-X
