= The Valiant (1962 film) =

British/Italian drama by Roy Ward Baker

- British quad poster
- Directed by: Roy Ward Baker
- Written by: Play L'Equipage au complet Robert Mallet (writer); Adaptation: Giorgio Capitani; Franca Caprino; Robert Mallet; Willis Hall; Keith Waterhouse
- Produced by: Jon Penington
- Starring: John Mills; Ettore Manni; Roberto Risso
- Cinematography: Wilkie Cooper
- Edited by: Lea Pardo; John Pomeroy
- Music by: Christopher Whelen
- Production companies: BHP; Euro International Film (EIA)
- Distributed by: United Artists Corporation (UK)
- Release date: 4 January 1962
- Running time: 100 minutes
- Country: United Kingdom
- Language: English
- Budget: £245,439

The Valiant (also known as L'affondamento della Valiant) is a 1962 British-Italian drama film directed by Roy Ward Baker and starring John Mills, Ettore Manni, Roberto Risso, Robert Shaw, and Liam Redmond. It is based on the Italian manned torpedo attack which seriously damaged the two British battleships Valiant and Queen Elizabeth, the destroyer HMS Jervis and the oil tanker Sagona at the harbour of Alexandria on 18-19 December 1941.

The film had a Royal Gala Premiere on 4 January 1962 at the Odeon Leicester Square in the presence of Princess Marina, Duchess of Kent.

== Plot ==
Harbour of Alexandria 18-19 December 1941. Two Italian frogmen are captured under suspicion of placing a mine under HMS Valiant. They are brought onto the ship for questioning.

== Cast ==
- John Mills as Captain Charles Eric Morgan
- Ettore Manni as Luigi Durand de la Penne
- Roberto Risso as Emilio Bianchi
- Robert Shaw as Lieutenant Field
- Liam Redmond as Commander Reilly
- Laurence Naismith as Admiral Andrew Browne Cunningham
- Ralph Michael as Commander Clark
- Colin Douglas as Chief Gunner's Mate
- John Meillon as sailor Bedford
- Moray Watson as Turnbull
- Dinsdale Landen as sailor Norris
- Patrick Barr as Reverend Ellis
- Charles Houston as Medical Orderly Parker
- Gordon Rollings as sailor 'Agony' Payne
- Brian Rawlinson as one of the tea drinkers
- Angus Lennie as sailor saying 'Manners'
- Leonardo Cortese as Junio Valerio Borghese
- Terence Knapp as Wilkinson

== Production ==
Roy Ward Baker said he was approached by John Pennington with the script by Willis Hall and Keith Waterhouse. "It was a good script," says Baker. "The two sailors were given some sour wartime humour." The producers wanted John Mills to play the captain and asked Baker, "to contact him because we'd made so many pictures together. So, I did and with a certain amount of reluctance Johnny agreed to do it. From that point on we were more or less in business."

Most of the finance came from Italy, where the movie was shot with a British-Italian crew.

== Reception ==
The Monthly Film Bulletin wrote: "Bitty narrative jumping from character to character, unimaginative use of sound including that hoary thriller standby, the loudly ticking clock, and stiff-upper-lip characters with stock human problems obtrusively tacked on – all end up dissipating audience involvement. And, although the screenplay is adapted from a French stage hit, "the usual lower deck humorists are there to kill off whatever suspense has been achieved. Dinsdale Landen and John Meillon are a good team in these Pinter/music-hall réles, and it is not their fault that they do so much to wreck the story's development. The mildly clever epilogue to the explosion is put across in so skimpy a fashion that it goes for nothing. As for the somewhat intermittent ethics of the subplot, not all John Mills's wrinkled concern nor Robert Shaw's manly distress makes their moral problem for a moment convincingly seaworthy. By the end, it is the Italian prisoners and H.M.S. Valiant, played ironically by an Italian cruiser reprieved from the scrapyard, which have gained most sympathy. And perhaps that suggests the national viewpoint from which the film should in fact have been made."

== See also ==
- Luigi Durand de la Penne
- Raid on Alexandria (1941)
- The Silent Enemy
