= Antonio Marceglia =

Italian naval officer (1915 - 1952)

Antonio Marceglia (28 July 1915, Pirano – 13 July 1992, Venice) was a captain in the Naval Engineers during World War II. A municipal swimming pool at 245 via Sandro Gallo in Lido di Venezia is named after him.

== Life ==
Marceglia incumbent in 1933 as an officer cadet in the naval engineers. In 1938, he graduated from the University of Genoa and became a Sottotenente. On 10 June 1940 (the day Italy declared war on the United Kingdom) he joined the submarine Ruggero Settimo, in which he took part in three missions in the Mediterranean. In October of that year, he joined the Gruppo Mezzi d'Assalto, and after spending his time training on the River Serchio, he took part in two missions against the Royal Navy base in Gibraltar on 26 May and 20 September 1941.

He also joined the Raid on Alexandria on 19 December 1941, which seriously damaged the battleships Valiant and Queen Elizabeth, the tanker Sagona and the destroyer Jervis. Marceglia was captured during the operation and held in POW camps in Palestine and India. He returned to Italy in February 1944 following her surrender to the Allies and joined the Mariassalto unit fighting alongside the Allies. He requested leave and in December 1945 became a lieutenant colonel commanding a naval shipyard in Venice. He later became a member of the Consiglio Superiore of the Banca d'Italia under the governorship of Carlo Azeglio Ciampi. His death was reported in the Italian newspapers and also in The Times, which ran a long obituary for his noble effort, unparalleled devotion to the nation and uncompromising attitude.
