= Ernesto Forza =

Italian admiral

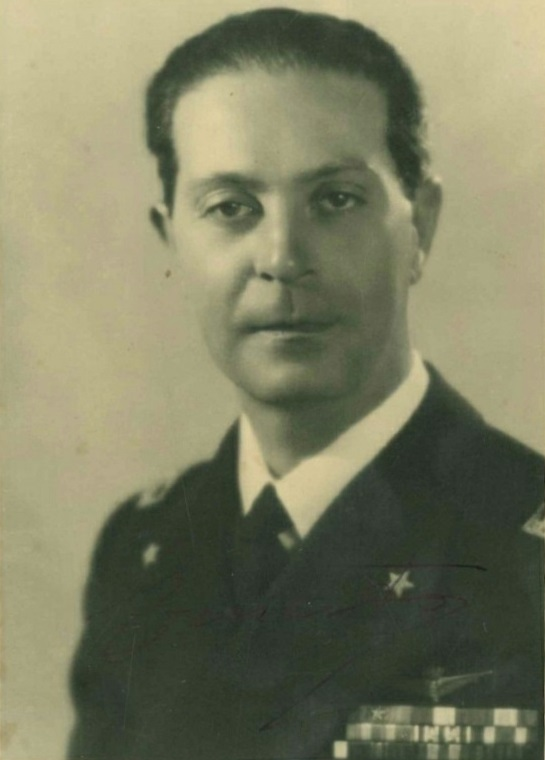
- Born: 21 August 1900; Rome, Kingdom of Italy
- Died: 13 April 1975 (aged 74); Rome, Italy
- Military career
- Allegiance: Kingdom of Italy; Italy
- Branch: Regia Marina; Italian Navy
- Service years: 1921–1960
- Rank: Fleet Admiral
- Commands: Pietro Micca (submarine); 2nd MAS Flotill; Decima Flottiglia MAS; Groppo (torpedo boat); Mariassalto; Giuseppe Garibaldi; 1st Naval Division; Autonomous Naval Command Sicily
- Conflicts: Italian invasion of Albania; World War II; Operation Substance; Battle of the Mediterranean
- Awards: Gold Medal of Military Valor; Silver Medal of Military Valor; War Cross for Military Valor; Military Order of Italy; Order of Merit of the Italian Republic

Ernesto Forza (Rome, 21 August 1900 – 13 April 1975) was an Italian admiral. During World War II he commanded the Decima Flottiglia MAS, the special operations unit of the Royal Italian Navy, from July 1940 to May 1943, and then its equivalent within the Italian Co-belligerent Navy, Mariassalto, after the armistice of Cassibile. He continued his career in the postwar Marina Militare.

== Biography ==
After attending the Naval Academy of Livorno, he graduated as ensign in 1921, assigned on the battleship Conte di Cavour. In 1928 he was promoted to lieutenant and assigned to the 143rd Seaplane Squadron, and three years later he liaison officer with the Ministry of Aeronautics. In 1935 he was promoted to lieutenant commander and given command of the submarine Pietro Micca and in 1939 he was transferred to the light cruiser Luigi di Savoia Duca degli Abruzzi, participating in the invasion of Albania in April 1939.

At the beginning of the Second World War he was Head of the Air Reconnaissance Employment Office at the Ministry of the Navy. In June 1941 he took command of the 2nd MAS Flotilla in Sicily, and in July he attacked a British Malta-bound convoy and torpedoed MV Sydney Star with his MAS 532 during Operation Substance, for which he was awarded the Gold Medal of Military Valor. Later that month he assumed command of the Decima Flottiglia MAS in place of Commander Vittorio Moccagatta, who had been killed during an ill-fated attack on La Valletta, and commanded it through most of the Mediterranean War, planning and overseeing the raid on Alexandria, the raid on Algiers and several raids on Gibraltar. In May 1943 he left command of the X MAS to Junio Valerio Borghese and assumed command of the Ciclone-class torpedo boat Groppo, which however was sunk by an air raid in Messina shortly after he had taken command; he subsequently became Chief of Staff of the 7th Naval Division.

After the armistice of Cassibile and promotion to captain he was given command of Mariassalto, the successor of the X MAS in the Italian Co-belligerent Navy (Borghese and most of the men and equipment of the X MAS had remained in northern Italy and pledged allegiance to the Italian Social Republic), earning a Silver Medal of Military Valor for a successful raid on German-occupied Genoa in April 1945. After the war, in November 1948 he assumed command of the light cruiser Giuseppe Garibaldi, in 1952 he was promoted to rear admiral and in 1956 to vice admiral. He was commander of the 1st Naval Division and later of the Autonomous Naval Command of Sicily. In 1960 he retired from active service with the rank of Fleet Admiral, and on the following year he was made Grand Officer of the Order of Merit of the Italian Republic. He died in his native Rome in 1975.
