= Mario Marino =

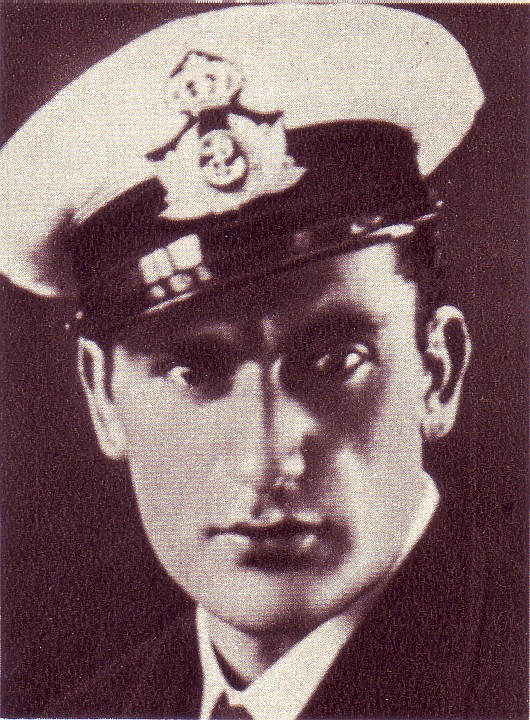
Mario Marino

Mario Marino (27 March 1914 in Salerno – 11 May 1982 in Salerno) was an Italian sailor of the Regia Marina during World War Two. As a diver and human-torpedo operator with the Decima Flottiglia MAS, he won the Gold Medal of Military Valour for the Raid on Alexandria on 19 December 1941. A 97-ton submarine-support speedboat of the Italian Navy launched in 1984 is named after him.

== Life ==
He volunteered for the navy in January 1934 and was assigned to the diving division, attending the Scuola C.R.E.M. at Varignano near La Spezia. At the end of the course he was assigned to the naval command at Gaeta. He then joined the destroyer Freccia and in 1936 the submarine H6, attended the first diving course and took part in the first experiments in exiting a submerged submarine. At the end of the course he took part in the Italian invasion of Ethiopia and the Spanish Civil War. In 1938 he took part in the Corso per Alti Fondali in deep-sea diving and on 4 June 1940 he joined the Titano and the 1ª Flottiglia MAS as an assault-submarine operator, taking part in missions with the MAS.

In May 1941 he rose to the non commissioned officer rank of 2º Capo Palombaro Sommozzatore and on the night of 25–26 July 1941 he took part in a raid on a Royal Navy base on Malta as second operator to Vincenzo Martellotta. On the night of 18–19 December 1941 he was Martellotta's second operator again, this time on the Siluro Lenta Corsa SLC 222, during the raid on Alexandria which severely damaged two battleships, a tanker and a destroyer. Marino and Martellotta were both captured after the action but Marino was released in October 1944 to join the Mariassalto fighting alongside the Allies.

In 1949 Marino was promoted to Capo di 1ª Classe Palombaro and in 1962 he was put in command of the Gruppo S.D.A.I. at La Spezia at the rank of sottotenente, a post he held until he was shifted to the reserves in March 1977 at the rank of Capitano di Corvetta.
