= Vincenzo Martellotta =

Italian soldier

Vincenzo Martellotta (1 January 1913, Taranto - 27 August 1973, Castelfranco Emilia) was an officer of the Italian Navy during World War II. The Istituto Comprensivo Martellotta school in Taranto is named after him, as is the Italian Navy auxiliary ship launched in 1990 with the pennant number A5320

== Life ==
After graduating in classics from the Liceo Morea of Conversano, he enrolled at the Faculty of Engineering at the University of Naples. Attracted by the sea, he applied to the Italian Naval Academy in Livorno and in October 1931 it shall submit an application to ' Naval Academy in Livorno and in October 1931 he was admitted as a student. In 1934 he moved to the Institute of War in Turin and gained a degree in industrial engineering at the Turin Polytechnic. He was promoted to sub-lieutenant (gunnery) in the navy in 1935 and to lieutenant the following year. After finishing the supplementary course at the Naval Academy, in October 1937 he was sent to Massawa to head the Navy's torpedo, artillery and engine-repair workshops there.

He returned to Italy in 1939 and initially worked at the underwater weaponry directorate at La Spezia, before moving to the torpedo and submarine testing facility at Taranto. In October 1940 he moved to the Decima Flottiglia MAS and at the end of a training course took part in operations off Malta on 26 July 1941 (for which he won the Silver Medal of Military Valor) and the raid on Alexandria on the night of 18–19 December 1941. The latter severely damaged two Royal Navy battleships and the tanker Sagona - Martellota and Mario Marino attacked the tanker and also damaged the destroyer HMS Jervis. He was awarded the Gold Medal of Military Valour, but was captured during the engagement. He was released in February 1944 after Italy surrendered to the Allies and joined the Mariassalto unit to fight against the Germans.

After the war's end, he volunteered for mine clearance and repairing the ports of Genoa, San Remo, Oneglia and Porto Maurizio. He and his brother Diego (a member of the bersaglieri and a chemical-warfare expert) also assisted in making the ports of Brindisi, Bari, Molfetta and Manfredonia usable again. In 1947 he and his men put out a fire in an explosives depot in Bari, personally neutralizing chemical leaking from a bomb and sustaining mustard gas burns which left him in hospital. For his actions he was awarded the Silver Medal for Civil Valour. He was promoted to lieutenant colonel (navy) in January 1953 and in 1960 he was placed in the reserves with the rank of colonel (navy).
