= Charles Eric Morgan =

Royal Navy Admiral (1889–1951)

Admiral Sir Charles Eric Morgan, KCB, DSO (19 May 1889 – 1 August 1951) was a Royal Navy officer. A specialist in navigation, he served in both world wars.

He was the captain of the battleship HMS Valiant from 1940 to 1942, during which the ship was damaged by an Italian attack.

After his retirement from the Royal Navy, Morgan joined the Blue Funnel Line as staff captain in Clytoneus.
