= Raid on Alexandria (1941) =

Italian frogman raid on British warships

- Part of the Battle of the Mediterranean of the Second World War
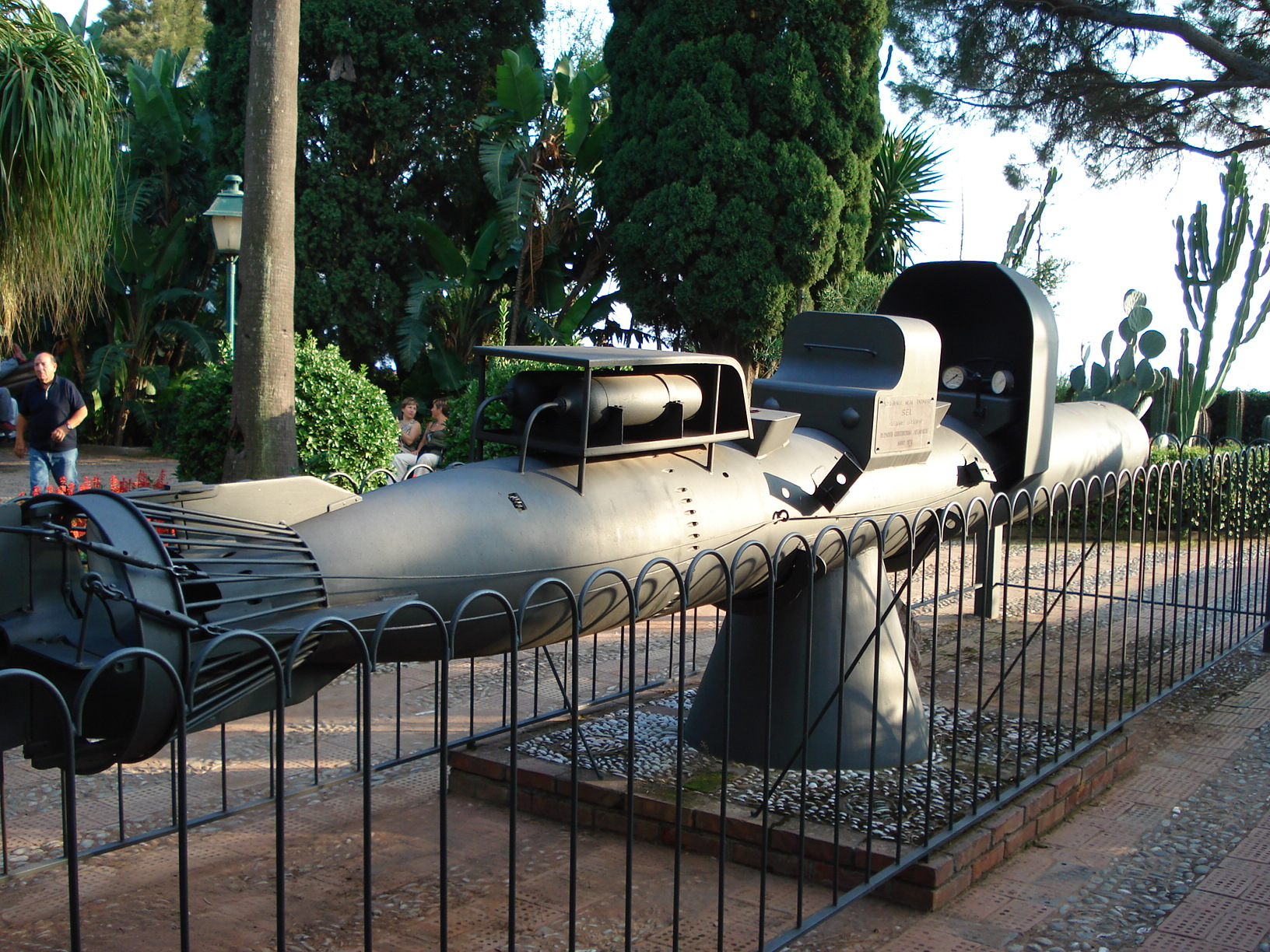
- An Italian Siluro Lenta Corsa human torpedo
| Date | 19 December 1941 |
| Location | Alexandria, Kingdom of Egypt 31°10′43.71″N 29°51′44.89″E |
| Result | Italian victory |

Belligerents
| United Kingdom | Italy |

Commanders and leaders
| Charles Morgan | Junio Valerio Borghese Luigi Durand de la Penne |

Strength
| Mediterranean Fleet | 1 submarine; 3 human torpedoes |

Casualties and losses
| 2 battleships disabled; 1 destroyer damaged; 1 tanker damaged; 8 casualties | 6 crewmen captured |

The Raid on Alexandria (Operazione EA 3) was carried out on 19 December 1941 by Royal Italian Navy (Regia Marina) divers of the Decima Flottiglia MAS (Decima Flottiglia Motoscafi Armati Siluranti), who attacked and severely damaged two Royal Navy battleships at their moorings and damaged an oil tanker and a destroyer in the harbour of Alexandria, Egypt, using Siluro Lenta Corsa, manned torpedoes.

The attacks came at a difficult time for the Mediterranean Fleet, after the loss of the aircraft carrier HMS Ark Royal and the battleship Barham to U-boats, the loss of ships during the Battle of Crete and the sinking of much of Force K on an Italian minefield, the day before the human torpedo attack on Alexandria. Ships also had to be sent to the Eastern Fleet in the Indian Ocean.

== Background ==
=== Decima MAS ===
The interest of the Regia Marina in small boat warfare lay dormant between 1918 and the diplomatic crisis with Britain over the Second Italo-Ethiopian War 1935–1936. In 1935 and early 1936, Captain Teseo Tesei and Captain Elios Toschi tested a human torpedo in La Spezia on the Tyrrhenian Sea and resumed testing in May. The Ethiopian defeat in 1936 ended the tests but work on assault boats continued. On 28 September 1938, Supermarina ordered the I Flottiglia MAS (1st Torpedo Motorboat Flotilla), based at La Spezia, to establish a research department (the Sezione Armi Speciali (Special Weapons Section) from 1939. The detachment had a few officers at HQ, seven at a confidential base at Bocca di Serchio for human torpedo and frogman training and another six officers to pilot the assault motorboats, of which seven had been built, plus eleven Siluro Lenta Corsa human torpedoes.

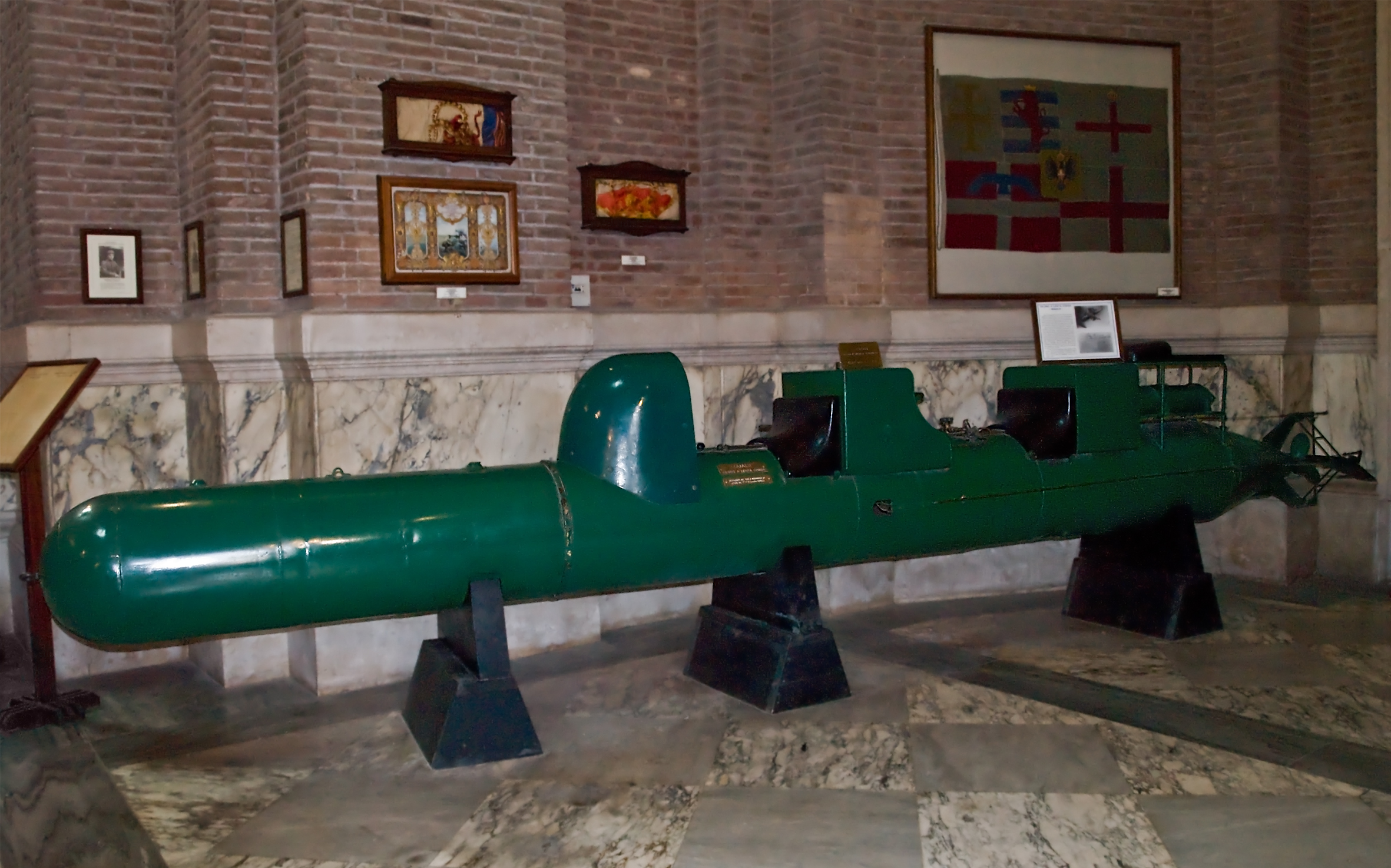
A Siluro Lenta Corsa (Maiale) at the Museo Sacrario delle Bandiere delle Forze Armate, Rome.

On 24 February 1940, the 1st MAS Flotilla and the Special Weapons Section was taken over by Commander Mario Giorgini and in August attempts to use the unconventional weapons began, with little success and the capture of Giorgini in October. On 23 January 1941 Commander Vittorio Moccagatta replaced Giorgini and on 15 March formed the Decima Flottiglia Motoscafi Armati Siluranti (10th Torpedo Motorboat Flotilla, Decima MAS). The new force had a HQ, including a plans office and a weapons section. The surface assault boats and the training school (Lieutenant-Commander Giorgio Giobbe) were split from the human torpedoes and other underwater weapons (Lieutenant-Commander Junio Valerio Borghese), the captain of the Italian submarine Scirè. Decima MAS remained at La Spezia and an advanced base was set up in Augusta, Sicily.

=== Ultra ===
The British code-breakers of the Government Code and Cypher School (GC & CS) alerted Admiral Andrew Cunningham the commander in chief of the Mediterranean Fleet before 17 December 1942, that its decodes of Italian messages encyphered on the Italian C 38m machine, showed that Supermarina, the Italian naval staff, had some interest in the port of Alexandria but without details. Torpedo nets were set up around the battleships HMS Valiant and Queen Elizabeth and other precautions were taken. On the day, Cunningham was told that an Italian reconnaissance aircraft had reported that Valiant and Queen Elizabeth were at their moorings and that the sea was calm, an unusual item to report. On 18 December GC & CS reported that the reconnaissance was urgent; Cunningham and his staff issued an alert at 10:25 a.m. that

Attacks on Alexandria by air, boat or human torpedo may be expected when calm weather prevails. Look-outs and patrols should be warned accordingly.

== Prelude ==
On 3 December, the submarine Scirè (Lieutenant Junio Valerio Borghese) of the Italian Regia Marina left the naval base of La Spezia carrying three manned torpedoes, nicknamed maiali (pigs). At the island of Leros in the Aegean Sea, the submarine secretly picked up six men of the Decima Flottiglia MAS, Lieutenant Commander Luigi Durand de la Penne and Sergeant-Major Emilio Bianchi (maiale nº 221), Captain Vincenzo Martellotta and Sergeant-Major Mario Marino (maiale nº 222) and Captain Antonio Marceglia and Lance Corporal Spartaco Schergat (maiale nº 223).

== Operazione EA 3 ==
On the night of 18/19 December, 1.3 mi (1.1 nmi; 2.1 km) from the commercial (eastern) harbour of Alexandria, Scirè released the maiali at a depth of 49 ft (15 m) about 5 nmi (9.3 km; 5.8 mi) from the naval anchorage. The maiali reached the harbour and entered the naval base when the British opened the boom gate to let in three destroyers. The frogmen were shaken by the explosive charges being dropped in the harbour by patrol craft. The maiali crews found it comparatively easy to get over the torpedo nets around the battleships but attaching a charge to Valiant from its bilge keels was difficult and the crew dropped the explosive onto the sea bed about 15 ft (4.6 m) below the ship. Marceglia and Schergat, planting their bomb 5 ft (1.5 m) beneath the keel of Queen Elizabeth, found it much easier and suspended the charge from the bilge keels as planned. The maiali crew who attacked Valiant were discovered holding on to the mooring buoy but gave nothing away when questioned.

The prisoners were assumed to have already planted a bomb and were detained in a room near the bottom of the ship. At 5:47 a.m. an explosion under the rear of the tanker Sagona (7,554 GRT) did severe damage to the ship and to the destroyer HMS Jervis oiling alongside. At 5:50 a.m. one of the prisoners on Valiant asked to see the captain and told him that the ship was going to blow up; fifteen minutes later there was an explosion under Valiant's A and B turrets. Four minutes after the explosion under Valiant there was another explosion, this time under Queen Elizabeth, near its boiler rooms. There were eight casualties and the battleships were put out of action. The crews of the other two maiali got ashore and tried to reach the submarine Zaffiro, due to meet them off Rosetta but were captured during the next 48 hours. (Note: Queen Elizabeth had a draught of 33 ft 5 in (10.19 m) forward and 32 ft 7 in (9.93 m) aft and after the explosion its draught was 41 ft 10 in (12.75 m) forward, 33 ft 10 in (10.31 m) aft. Queen Elizabeth was moored in approximately 48 ft (15 m) of water.)

== Aftermath ==
=== Analysis ===
According to Marcantonio Bragadin, a former admiral of the Regia Marina Where the Italian fleet had failed, six sailors had succeeded. (Note: After the war, when the frogmen were released from British captivity, the former captain of Valiant, now Admiral Charles Morgan, Chief of the Allied Naval Mission in Italy, asked for the privilege of giving the Gold Medal of Military Valor (Medaglia d'oro al valor militare) to Durand de la Penne.) Yet, despite the disparity of forces and the apparent superiority of the Regia Marina, Force K continued to contest the waters around Malta and to escort convoys from Alexandria to Malta and back again, culminating in the Second Battle of Sirte on 22 March. Cunningham reported to Sir Dudley Pound, the First Lord of the Admiralty, that the result was a disaster. Cunningham wrote that it was fortunate that a junior officer suggested that ships should keep their propellers turning slowly in reverse, creating a strong enough current to frustrate a swimmer. The idea was adopted, Cunningham remarking, "It is a pity we did not think of it before". To maintain appearances, Cunningham remained on board Queen Elizabeth keeping the usual routines going, marine bands parading, the ceremonies of the morning colours and sunset continuing.

The recent loss of HMS Ark Royal and Barham to U-boats, the sinking of much of Force K on an Italian minefield, on top of the losses during the Battle of Crete and having to send ships to reinforce the Eastern Fleet, reduced the Mediterranean Fleet to a force of light cruisers and destroyers. Alexandria decodes from the Italian C 38m cypher machine made it practical for the Admiralty to keep the extent of the damage to Valiant and Queen Elizabeth secret, which was not apparent to air reconnaissance, along with the loss of Barham, until late January 1942, when a prisoner mentioned the success at Alexandria, leading to the Italians making the most of this by sailing more convoys.

Days before the raid, the Royal Navy had suffered the loss of HMS Prince of Wales and HMS Repulse to Japanese bombers and with the Attack on Pearl Harbor, the Allies had lost about 38 per cent of their operational battleship strength during December. The coup at Alexandria neutralised the main remaining capital ships of the Mediterranean Fleet at a stroke. Along with transfers to the Eastern Fleet, the only ships left at Alexandria larger than a destroyer were the cruisers HMS Naiad, Dido and Euryalus. The Italian battle fleet had four battleships operational and grounds for confidence in the future; the deception to conceal the extent of the damage of Valiant and Queen Elizabeth did not last for long. In 2021, Andrew Boyd wrote that the Italians pulled off a "brilliant asymmetric attack" on the Eastern Fleet that was of similar magnitude to the British success at the Battle of Taranto (11/12 November 1940). The damage inflicted on the two battleships prevented them from reinforcing the Eastern Fleet in the Indian Ocean. The Italian attack was a strategically-significant victory that had been underestimated.

=== HMS Valiant ===
The explosive charge under Valiant was under the port torpedo bulge near A turret, holing the lower bulge and blowing the hole upwards over 60 ft × 30 ft (18.3 m × 9.1 m). The internal damage was spread from the keel to the lower bulge compartments, with flooding in the double-bottom bulge, A shell room and magazine and the compartments next to it up to the lower deck. Shock caused some damage to electrical equipment and the traversing mechanism for A turret was distorted. The main and auxiliary machinery were undamaged and the ship could put to sea if necessary. As many items as possible were taken off the ship to lighten it and then it was moved to Admiralty Floating Dock No. 5 on 21 December for temporary repairs; on 3 April 1942 she sailed to Durban for permanent repairs from 15 April to 7 July 1942.

=== HMS Queen Elizabeth ===
The explosion that disabled Queen Elizabeth was under B boiler room, damaging the double bottom and anti-torpedo bulges over 190 ft × 60 ft (58 m × 18 m). The floor of B boiler room and those of A and X boiler rooms, to a lesser extent, were forced upwards. The boiler rooms, the forward 4.5-inch magazines, Y boiler room and many other compartments were flooded up to the main deck, damaging boilers, machinery and other electrical equipment. The main and secondary armament remained operational but hydraulic power was lost. Queen Elizabeth took electrical current from submarines moored on either side. The ship was put into a floating dock for temporary repairs and she then proceeded to Port Sudan on 5 May where her tanks were repaired and fuel taken on for a journey to the US. In mid-July Queen Elizabeth sailed for the Norfolk Naval Shipyard in Virginia. Queen Elizabeth underwent permanent repairs from 6 September to 1 June 1943. She was out of action for a period of nearly eighteen months.

=== Sagona and HMS Jervis ===
Sagona was towed back to England and repairs took until 1946 to be completed. Jervis required a month in dock to make repairs.

== See also ==
- Italian auxiliary ship Olterra
- Lionel Crabb
- Military history of Italy during World War II
- Operation Source
- Raid on Algiers
