= HMS Valiant (1914) =

1914 Queen Elizabeth-class battleship of the Royal Navy

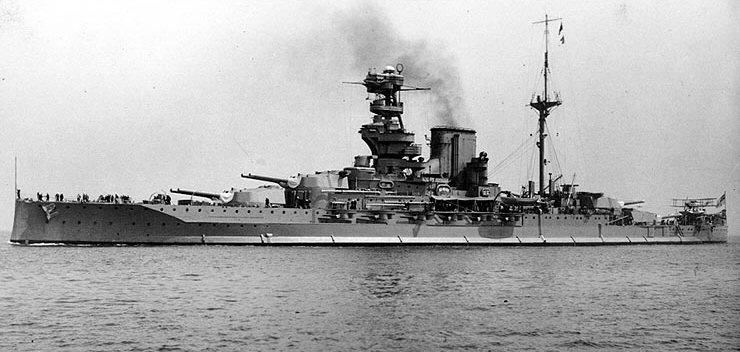
- Valiant between 1930 and 1937

History

United Kingdom
- Name: Valiant
- Ordered: 1912
- Builder: Fairfields, Govan
- Cost: £2,537,037
- Laid down: 31 January 1913
- Launched: 4 November 1914
- Commissioned: 19 February 1916
- In service: 1916
- Out of service: 1948
- Identification: Pennant number: 34 (1914); A6 (Jan 18); 43 (Apr 18); 02 (Nov 19)
- Motto: Valiant and Vigilant
- Fate: Sold for scrap, 19 March 1948

General characteristics (as built)
- Class & type: Queen Elizabeth-class battleship
- Displacement: 32,590 long tons (33,113 t); 33,260 long tons (33,794 t) (Deep load)
- Length: 639 ft 9 in (195 m)
- Beam: 90 ft 7 in (27.6 m)
- Draught: 33 ft (10.1 m)
- Installed power: 24 Babcock & Wilcox boilers; 75,000 shp (56,000 kW)
- Propulsion: 4 shafts; 2 steam turbine sets
- Speed: 24 knots (44 km/h; 28 mph)
- Range: 5,000 nmi (9,300 km; 5,800 mi) at 12 knots (22 km/h; 14 mph)
- Complement: 919 (1915); 1,218 (1919)
- Armament: 4 × twin 15 in (381 mm) guns; 14 × single 6 in (152 mm) guns; 2 × single 3 in (76 mm) AA guns; 4 × 21 in (533 mm) torpedo tubes
- Armour: Waterline belt: 13 in (330 mm); Deck: 1–3 in (25–76 mm); Barbettes: 7–10 in (178–254 mm); Gun turrets: 11–13 in (279–330 mm); Conning tower: 13 in (330 mm)

General characteristics (1937–1939 refit)
- Displacement: 32,468 long tons (32,989 t) (load displacement)
- Speed: 23 kn (43 km/h; 26 mph)
- Sensors & processing systems: Type 273 radar; Type 285 radar
- Armament: 4 × twin 15 in guns; 10 × twin 4.5 in (114 mm) DP guns; 4 × octuple 2 pdr (1.6 in (40 mm)) AA guns; 26 × twin 20 mm (0.8 in) AA guns; 4 × quadruple 0.5 in (12.7 mm) MGs
- Aircraft carried: 2

HMS Valiant was one of five Queen Elizabeth-class battleships built for the Royal Navy during the early 1910s. She was built at Devonport Royal Dockyard between January 1914 and November 1914, and entered service shortly after the outbreak of the First World War. She participated in the Battle of Jutland during the First World War as part of the Grand Fleet. Other than that battle, and the inconclusive Action of 19 August, her service during the war generally consisted of routine patrols and training in the North Sea.

During the interwar period, she was one of several warships involved in the Invergordon Mutiny, in which sailors struck against pay cuts. Valiant saw further action during the Second World War in the Mediterranean, where her service included destroying Vichy ships at Mers-el-Kébir and the Battle of Cape Matapan, during which time Prince Philip, Duke of Edinburgh served aboard as a midshipman. While in drydock in Alexandria, the battleship was severely damaged by an Italian raid. After additional refits and service in Sicily, she was sent to join the Eastern Fleet, raiding Japanese bases in Indonesia, before a drydock accident in Ceylon resulted in Valiant being returned to Devonport and decommissioned.

== Design and description ==
The Queen Elizabeth-class ships were designed to form a fast squadron for the fleet intended to operate against the leading ships of the opposing battleline. This required maximum offensive power and a speed several knots faster than any other battleship to allow them to defeat any type of ship.

=== Ship measures and propulsion ===
Valiant had a length overall of 639 feet 9 inches (195 m), a beam of 90 feet 7 inches (27.6 m) and a deep draught of 33 feet (10.1 m). She had a normal displacement of 32,590 long tons (33,113 t) and displaced 33,260 long tons (33,794 t) at deep load. She was powered by two sets of Brown-Curtis steam turbines, each driving two shafts using steam from 24 Babcock & Wilcox boilers. The turbines were rated at 75,000 shaft horsepower (56,000 kW) and intended to reach a maximum speed of 25 knots (46.3 km/h; 28.8 mph). The ship had a range of 5,000 nautical miles (9,260 km; 5,754 mi) at a cruising speed of 12 knots (22.2 km/h; 13.8 mph). Her crew numbered 919 officers and ratings in 1915 and 1,218 in 1919.

=== Armament, sensors and fire control ===
The Queen Elizabeth class was equipped with eight breech-loading (BL) 15-inch (381 mm) Mk I guns in four twin-gun turrets, in two superfiring pairs fore and aft of the superstructure, designated 'A', 'B', 'X', and 'Y' from front to rear. Twelve of the fourteen BL 6-inch (152 mm) Mk XII guns were mounted in casemates along the broadside of the vessel amidships; the remaining pair were mounted on the forecastle deck near the aft funnel and were protected by gun shields. The anti-aircraft (AA) armament were composed of two quick-firing (QF) 3-inch (76 mm) 20 cwt Mk I (Note: "Cwt" is the abbreviation for hundredweight, 20 cwt referring to the weight of the gun.) guns. The ships were fitted with four submerged 21-inch (533 mm) torpedo tubes, two on each broadside.

Valiant was completed with two fire-control directors fitted with 15-foot (4.6 m) rangefinders. One was mounted above the conning tower, protected by an armoured hood, and the other was in the spotting top above the tripod mast. Each turret was also fitted with a 15-foot rangefinder. The main armament could be controlled by 'B' turret as well. The secondary armament was primarily controlled by directors mounted on each side of the compass platform on the foremast once they were fitted in July 1917.

=== Armour ===
The waterline belt of the Queen Elizabeth class consisted of Krupp cemented armour (KC) that was 13 inches (330 mm) thick over the ships' vitals. The gun turrets were protected by 11 to 13 inches (279 to 330 mm) of KC armour and were supported by barbettes 7–10 inches (178–254 mm) thick. The ships had multiple armoured decks that ranged from 1 to 3 inches (25 to 76 mm) in thickness. The main conning tower was protected by 13 inches of armour. After the Battle of Jutland, 1 inch of high-tensile steel was added to the main deck over the magazines and additional anti-flash equipment was added in the magazines.

The ship was fitted with flying-off platforms mounted on the roofs of 'B' and 'X' turrets in 1918, from which fighters and reconnaissance aircraft could launch. During her 1929–1930 refit, the platform was removed from 'X' turret and a folding Type EIH catapult was installed on the quarterdeck, along with a crane to recover a floatplane. The platform atop 'B' turret, the catapult and its crane were removed when Valiant was reconstructed in 1937–1939.

=== Modifications ===
Between 1929 and 1930, anti-torpedo bulges were added, which increased Valiant's beam to 31.70 metres (104.0 ft). The two funnels were trunked into one and a single octuple 2-pounder mounting was added. Two of the torpedo tubes were removed, and the aircraft platforms were replaced by a single catapult. These modifications brought the maximum displacement up to 35,970 tons. In 1936, a second octuple 2-pounder mounting was added.

Between March 1937 and November 1939, HMS Valiant underwent a complete rebuild at Devonport. The machinery was changed to eight Admiralty 3-drum boilers with four Parsons steam turbines producing a total of 80,000 shp (60,000 kW). Fuel load was 3,393 tons oil, and maximum speed was reduced to 23.5 knots (43.5 km/h; 27.0 mph) despite the increase in power, due to the increase in displacement and draught. Deck armour was increased to 5 inches (130 mm) over the magazines, 2.55 inches (65 mm) over the machinery while the new 4.5 inches (110 mm) guns had between 1 inch (25 mm) and 2 inches (51 mm) of armour. The secondary armament was changed to 20 × 4.5 inches (110 mm) Mk I dual purpose guns in 10 twin mountings and the close-range anti-aircraft armament consisted of four octuple 2-pounder "pom pom" mountings. The ship's fire control was modernised to include the HACS MkIV AA fire control system and the Admiralty Fire Control Table Mk VII for surface fire control of the main armament. These modifications increased draught to 10 metres (33 ft) and maximum displacement to 36,513 tons.

== Construction and career ==
HMS Valiant was laid down at the Fairfield Shipbuilding and Engineering Company, Govan on 31 January 1913, launched on 4 November 1914 and commissioned on 19 February 1916 under the command of Captain Maurice Woollcombe. Upon completion, Valiant joined the recently formed 5th Battle Squadron of the Grand Fleet.

=== First World War ===
==== Battle of Jutland ====
In an attempt to lure out and destroy part of the Grand Fleet, the German High Seas Fleet, which consisted of 16 battleships, 6 battle cruisers, and other ships, left Wilhelmshaven early on the morning of 31 May. The plan called for Vice-Admiral Franz Hipper to leave Wilhelmshaven with the battlecruisers of the 1st and the light cruisers of the 2nd Reconnaissance Group and push north out of sight of the Danish coast. There he was to provoke a departure of British ships by attacking coastal towns and lure them toward the High Seas Fleet. The intelligence Division of the British Admiralty Room 40 had intercepted and decoded German radio traffic containing operational plans. As a result, the Admiralty ordered Admiral Sir John Jellicoe and Vice-Admiral Sir David Beatty to sail that night with the Grand Fleet from Scapa Flow, Cromarty, and Rosyth to cut off and destroy the High Seas Fleet.

After the 5th Battle Squadron departed Rosyth that morning, Beatty ordered a course change to the northeast at 14:15 to join up with Grand Fleet. At 14:20, Hipper's battlecruisers spotted Beatty's battlecruisers. At 14:32, Beatty ordered a course change to the east-southeast to cut off the Germans' line of retreat. Hipper ordered his ships to turn to starboard and set a southeasterly course. With this turn, Hipper fell back to the High Seas Fleet, which was 97 kilometres (60 mi) behind him. Beatty then also changed course to the east to catch up with Hipper.

By 15:05, the 5th Battle Squadron had had the German light cruisers within range. By 15:08, the 5th Battle Squadron had reached the rear of the German battlecruisers and Valiant opened fire on the SMS Moltke, which received one hit. The situation changed when the German battleships came into view at 15:40. Since Beatty had failed to sufficiently signal his intentions when he turned north, the battleships of the 5th Battle Squadron were on an opposite course past the battlecruisers and headed directly for the approaching main body of the High Seas Fleet. At 15:48, Scheer opened fire on the British battleships. Valiant managed to avoid hits and in turn fired on the SMS Moltke between 16:15 and 16:30. At 16:46, Valiant was severely shaken by a salvo, but emerged unscathed.

Valiant continued to participate in the battle until the enemy came out of sight at a distance of 17 kilometers at about 17:02. A hit on Valiant was incorrectly claimed by the SMS Grosser Kurfürst at 17:09, but poor visibility hampered most of Valiant's actions for the next hour. She reopened fire on the German ships at 18:15 but scored no hits. Valiant was the only capital ship in the Fifth Battle Squadron to sustain no damage.

==== Post-Jutland service ====
On 19 August 1916, the 5th Battle Squadron was sent to prevent an attack by the German High Seas Fleet on the town of Sunderland. The 5th Battle Squadron were stationed 30 nmi (56 km; 35 mi) ahead of the main fleet to scout for the High Seas Fleet, but did not see combat as the High Seas Fleet abandoned the attack before any engagement could occur.

Following a night-shooting exercise on 24 August 1916, HMS Warspite collided with Valiant, necessitating repairs which were completed by 18 September of that same year.

=== Inter-war period ===
From 1919 to the end of 1924, Valiant was part of the 1st Battle Squadron, Atlantic Fleet after which she was with the 1st Battle Squadron of the Mediterranean Fleet until March 1929. On 2 December 1930 she was recommissioned for service in the Atlantic where in 1931 her crew participated in the Invergordon Mutiny. March 1932 saw her transferred to the Home Fleet until in July 1935 she was once again in the Mediterranean.

=== World War II ===
On 30 November 1939, Valiant was commissioned at Devonport and assigned to the America and West Indies Station. She returned to Britain in December 1939, and was assigned to escort Canadian troops across the Atlantic. She joined the Home Fleet on 7 January 1940. Valiant engaged in escort duty for troop transports for most of early 1940.

In May 1940, Valiant supported the British landing forces in the Norwegian campaign; specifically, alongside HMS Warspite, she was sent to cover troop landings at Narvik. On 15 April 1940, during the Battles of Narvik, the submarine U-38 fired a torpedo at Valiant at Vaagsfjord, but missed. Following the battle, Valiant patrolled the fjord for a short period and then was sent to Scapa Flow with a screen of three destroyers.

==== Mers-el-Kébir ====
At the time of the surrender of France on 22 June 1940, the bulk of the French fleet lay at Mers-el-Kébir, Algeria. British Prime Minister Winston Churchill was very concerned that the French ships might fall into the hands of the Germans. The Vichy government gave assurances that it would prevent the Germans from seizing the ships, but Churchill did not believe them; thus, he intended to give the French an ultimatum. On Wednesday, 3 July 1940, Force H under the command of Vice Admiral James Fownes Somerville consisting of the aircraft carrier Ark Royal, the battlecruiser Hood, the battleships Valiant, Resolution, and Nelson, and other cruisers and destroyers appeared off the harbour entrance. Somerville radioed Admiral Marcel Gensoul to inform him of the British demands. After the ultimatum expired, the Valiant opened fire along with the Hood and Resolution. The Dunkerque, the Provence, and the Bretagne were hit and heavily damaged; the latter exploded and sank. After Somerville had ceased fire to give Gensoul another chance, he overlooked that the Strasbourg together with the five remaining destroyers had escaped into the open sea behind the thick smoke of the explosions. The Strasbourg, along with the destroyers Volta, Tigre and Le Terrible, reached Toulon on the evening of 4 July.

In September, Valiant joined the carrier HMS Illustrious with the squadron at Alexandria. For the remainder of the year, she sailed security duties in the Mediterranean, primarily on fleet advances. On the night of 18–19 December, together with the Warspite, she shelled the Albanian port of Valona.

==== Cape Matapan ====
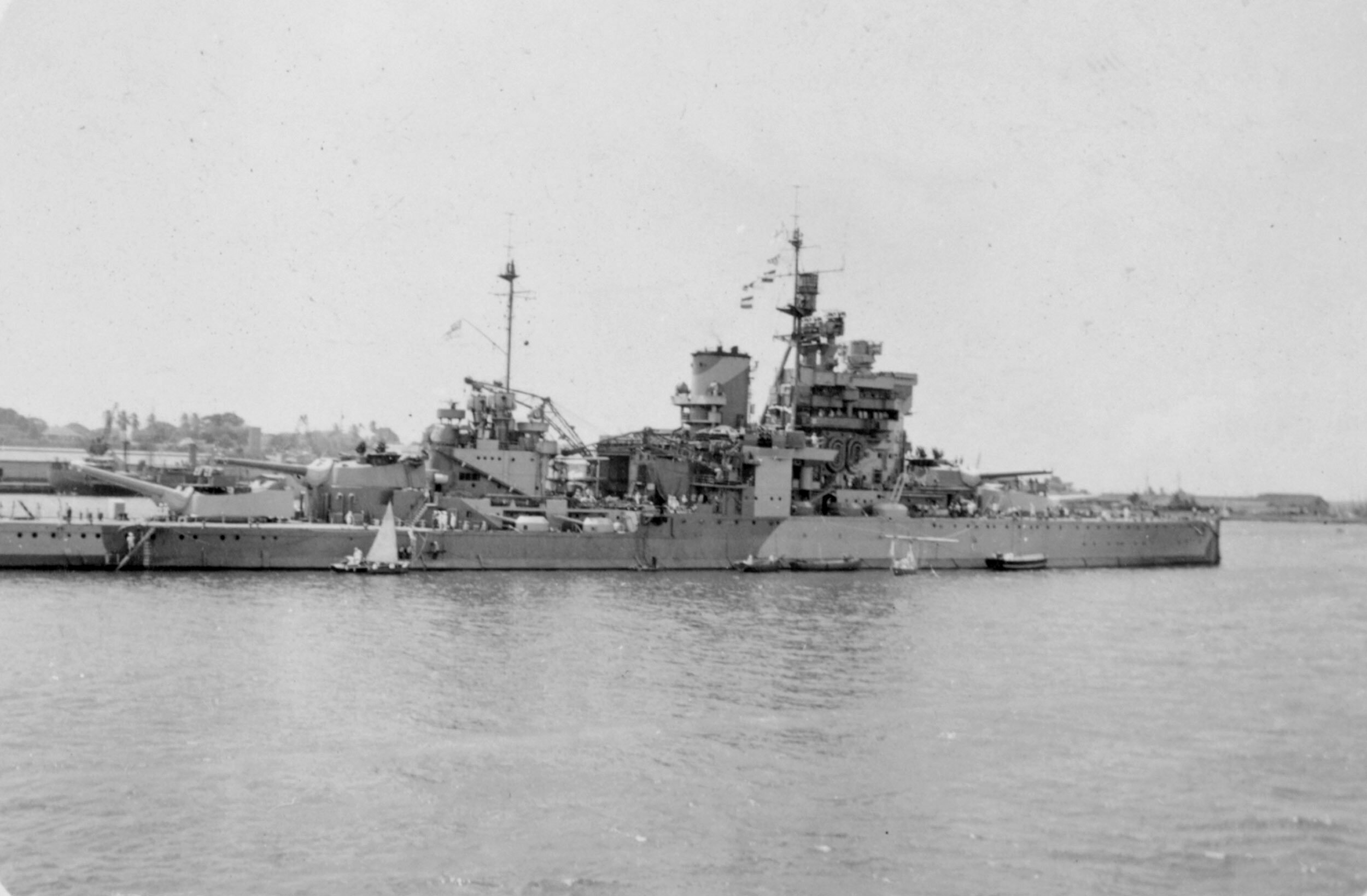
A camouflaged Valiant during World War II

With the help of an intercepted and decrypted Luftwaffe radio message, Admiral Cunningham learned that the Italians, under the command of Vice-Admiral Angelo Iachino, intended to attack the British fleet to distract them from transporting German troops to North Africa. After the Italians sortied in a convoy of 22 ships, including the battleship Vittorio Veneto, on 26 March, Cunningham brought all his ships into position, including the Barham. On 28 March, British cruisers encountered the Italian fleet but were forced to retreat by the Vittorio Veneto. Cunningham then ordered an air attack. Multiple air strikes by Formidable's Fairey Swordfish torpedo bombers damaged the Vittorio Veneto and crippled the heavy cruiser Pola. The Vittorio Veneto escaped westwards as darkness fell. Later that evening. Admiral Iachino ordered the two other heavy cruisers of the 1st Division to render assistance to Pola in the darkness. The Italian ships and the British arrived almost simultaneously at Pola's location, but the Italians had no idea that the British were nearby. On the other hand, the British knew exactly where the Italians were, thanks to their radar-equipped ships. They opened fire at point-blank range and sank the Zara and Fiume. During the battle, Midshipman Prince Philip of Greece and Denmark, who had been assigned to Valiant two months earlier, controlled the battleship's searchlights. For his identification of an Italian cruiser during the battle, he was mentioned in dispatches.

==== Battle of Crete ====
In May 1941, Valiant was stationed at Alexandria, and was sent to operate west of Crete as part of Force A1 under Rear Admiral H B Rawlings on 18 May. On 20 May, the German attack on the island began; for the next two days, Force A1 was repeatedly attacked from the air. Valiant was struck by two bombs at 16:45 on 22 May but was not seriously damaged. Force A1 was ordered to return to Alexandria and did so on 23 May.

==== Mining at Alexandria ====
On 19 December 1941, Valiant was seriously damaged by limpet mines placed by Italian frogmen of Decima Flottiglia MAS, who entered Alexandria harbour riding two-man "human torpedoes" ("maiali"). Her sister ship Queen Elizabeth was also damaged. Lieutenant Durand de la Penne placed the mines on Valiant. The other two teams attached their mines and escaped, but de la Penne's maiale broke down. De la Penne pushed the maiale under Valiant and left it on the bottom. Then he and his companion Corporal Emilio Bianchi emerged and were captured and interrogated by Captain Charles Morgan but told him nothing. A few minutes before the mines were scheduled to detonate, when it was too late to find and deactivate them, he informed Morgan of their existence (but not their location) to allow the crew on board to evacuate. The frogmen were held in the locked compartment, which was (unbeknownst to them or Morgan) just above where the mine would explode. Both were injured by the explosion but survived. The mine attached to Valiant was not actually in contact with her hull, so the damage was far less severe than to Queen Elizabeth. Despite having a heavy trim forward, her decks were above water, and she remained clear of the harbour bottom. Although nearly immobilised, she was able, although only for a few days, to give the impression of full battle readiness, at least until she could be repaired. Valiant was repaired in Durban, South Africa, carrying out post-refit trials in July 1942, and took part in exercises with the Eastern Fleet the following month. At the end of August, Valiant took part in Operation Touchstone, an exercise to test East Africa's defences against a seaborne invasion and to conduct a dress rehearsal for Operation Ironclad, the invasion of French Madagascar. She remained in African waters until the end of the year, and returned to Devonport for a refit in January 1943.

==== Sicily and Italy ====
To support the Allied invasion of Sicily and eventual Italian campaign, Valiant departed Scapa Flow for Gibraltar along with the Nelson, Rodney and Warspite on 17 June 1943. All four ships joined Force H on arrival. Between 2 and 3 September, Valiant and Warspite covered the attack across the Strait of Messina and bombed the Italian coastal batteries at Reggio. Subsequently, Force H was tasked with covering the Western Naval Task Force from surface-based attacks during the invasion of Salerno, which began on 9 September. A German counterattack began on 14 September, and in response Valiant and Warspite were brought closer to the battle, resulting in damage to Warspite but a tactical withdrawal of German forces between 16 and 17 September. Valiant returned home for overhaul in October 1943. Upon completion on 1 December, Valiant was detached to the Eastern Fleet.

==== Drydock accident in Ceylon ====
In 1944, Valiant was sent to the Far East to join the Eastern Fleet, where she took part in raids against Japanese bases in Indonesia. On 8 August 1944, she was severely damaged in an accident with the floating drydock at Trincomalee, Ceylon. The drydock was being raised with Valiant in it by pumping water from ballast tanks. The tanks were emptied in the wrong sequence for Valiant's weight distribution, which was exacerbated by her full munitions load. As a result, the drydock sagged, broke its back, and sank. Valiant's two inner [[propellers]] were jammed as well as one of her rudders. Valiant had remained in steam and was able to avoid worse damage or sinking.

=== Fate ===
Due to the incident in Ceylon, Valiant was planned to be sent to Alexandria, where there were suitable docking facilities for repairs; however, she could not steer a straight course and was unable to travel faster than 8 knots (15 km/h; 9.2 mph). She got as far as the Gulf of Suez, but grounded at the entrance to the Suez Canal. At Suez, Valiant's inner-prop shafts had to be removed in order to refloat her; the A-brackets holding the shafts and propellers were also cut, so both the propellers and shafts were sent to the seabed. She was subsequently sent to return to the United Kingdom via the Cape of Good Hope.

Valiant returned to the UK and was decommissioned in July 1945. For the rest of her career, Valiant formed part of the Imperieuse training establishment for the training of naval stokers (i.e. boiler mechanics) at Devonport. She was sold for scrap on 19 March 1948, and left Devonport for the breakers of Arnott Young at Cairnryan on 11 August of that year.
