= Decima Flottiglia MAS =

Italian naval commando frogman unit of the Fascist era

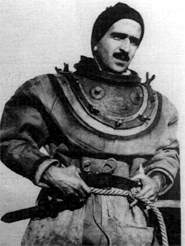
- Teseo Tesei, Italian naval officer who organized the Decima Flottiglia MAS and pioneered the use of underwater raids
- Active: March 1941–September 1943
- Country: Italy
- Branch: Regia Marina
- Type: Marines; Commando frogman
- Role: Human torpedo Raiding; Sabotage
- Nickname: Xª MAS
- Motto: "Memento Audere Semper" (Remember to always be bold)
- March: Inno della Xª MAS
- Equipment: SLC "Maiale" torpedoes MTM "Barchini" motor assault boats
- Engagements: Souda Bay, Gibraltar, Alexandria, Algiers, sank HMS York and 20 merchant ships
- Decorations: Golden Medal of Military Valour; Individual decorations: 29 Golden Medals of Military Valor; 104 Silver Medals of Military Valor; 33 Bronze Medals of Military Valor

Commanders
- Notable commanders: Mario Giorgini; Vittorio Moccagatta; Ernesto Forza; Junio Valerio Borghese

The Decima Flottiglia MAS (Decima Flottiglia Motoscafi Armati Siluranti, also known as La Decima or Xª MAS) (Italian for "10th Torpedo-Armed Motorboat Flotilla") was an Italian flotilla, with marines and commando frogman unit, of the Regia Marina (Royal Italian Navy). The acronym MAS also refers to various light torpedo boats used by the Regia Marina during World War I and World War II.

Decima MAS was active during the Battle of the Mediterranean and took part in a number of daring raids on Allied shipping. These operations involved surface speedboats (such as the raid on Souda Bay), human torpedoes (the raid on Alexandria) and Gamma frogmen (against Gibraltar). During the campaign, Decima MAS took part in more than a dozen operations which sank or damaged five warships (totalling 78,000 tons) and 20 merchant ships (totalling 130,000 GRT).

In 1943, after the Italian dictator Benito Mussolini was ousted, Italy left the Tripartite Pact. Some of the Xª MAS men who were stationed in German-occupied northern and central Italy enlisted to fight for Mussolini's newly formed Italian Social Republic (Repubblica Sociale Italiana or RSI) and retained the unit title, but were primarily employed as an anti-partisan force operating on land. Other Xª MAS men in southern Italy or other Allied-occupied areas joined the Italian Co-Belligerent Navy as part of the Mariassalto (Naval Assault) unit.

== Historical background ==
In World War I, on 1 November 1918, Raffaele Paolucci and Raffaele Rossetti of the Regia Marina rode a human torpedo (nicknamed Mignatta or "leech") into the harbour of Pula, where they sank the battleship Jugoslavija, of the navy of the State of Slovenes, Croats and Serbs, formerly the Austro-Hungarian battleship SMS Viribus Unitis, and the freighter Wien using limpet mines. They had no underwater breathing sets, and thus had to keep their heads above water to breathe. They were discovered and taken prisoner as they attempted to leave the harbour.

In the 1920s, sport spearfishing without breathing apparatus became popular on the Mediterranean coast of France and Italy. This spurred the development of modern swimfins, diving masks and snorkels.

In the 1930s Italian sport spearfishermen began using industrial or submarine-escape oxygen rebreathers, starting scuba diving in Italy.

== Unit origins and equipment ==
This new type of diving came to the attention of the Regia Marina which founded the first special forces underwater frogman unit, later copied by the Royal Navy and United States Navy. Capitano di Fregata (Commander) Paolo Aloisi was the first commander of the 1ª Flottiglia Mezzi d'Assalto ("First Assault Vehicle Flotilla"), formed in 1939 as a result of the research and development efforts of Majors Teseo Tesei and Elios Toschi of the naval combat engineers. The two resurrected Paolucci's and Rossetti's concept of human torpedoes.

In 1941, Commander Vittorio Moccagatta re-organised the First Flotilla into the Decima Flottiglia MAS, and divided the unit into two parts – a surface group operating fast explosive motor boats, and a sub-surface weapons group using human torpedoes called SLC (siluri a lenta corsa or "slow-running torpedoes", but nicknamed Maiale or "Pig" by their crews), as well as "Gamma" assault swimmers (nuotatori) using limpet mines. Moccagatta also created the frogman training school at the San Leopoldo base of the Italian Naval Academy in Livorno.

=== Decima MAS equipment ===
==== Siluro lenta corsa (SLC) ====
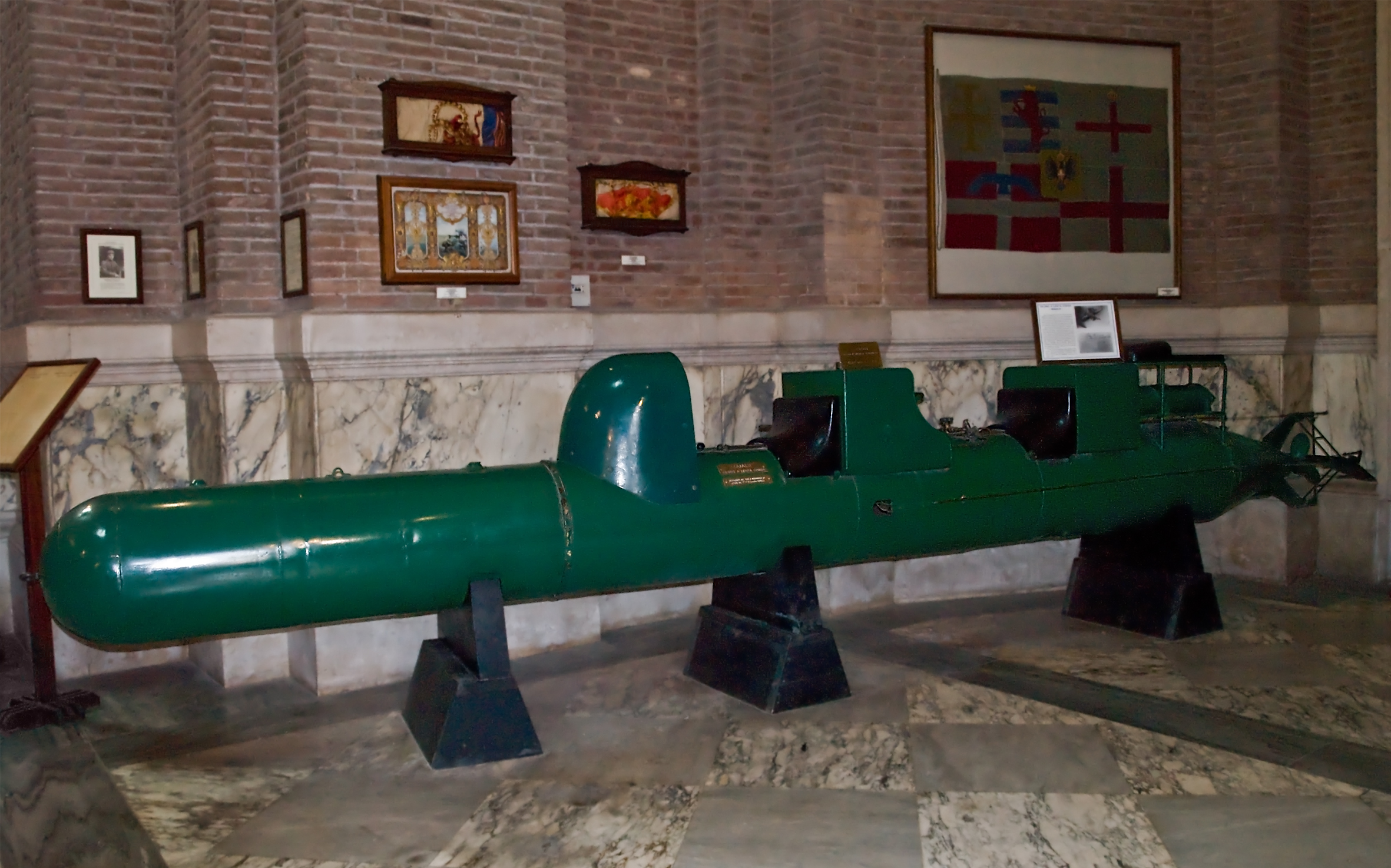
A SLC (Maiale at the Museo Sacrario delle Bandiere delle Forze Armate, Rome.

The Siluro Lenta Corsa (SLC, slow speed torpedo), known as Maiale (pig), was designed by Tesei and Toschi during 1935 and 1936. By late 1939 about eleven were ready and in July 1940 the production version, Series 100, began to arrive. In 1941 the improved Series 200 became ready for use. The standard 533 mm (21.0 in) torpedo with double propellers was changed to one larger propeller in a cowling; seats for a two-man crew were installed, with shields housing the controls. The SLC weighed 1.3–1.4 long tons (1.3–1.4 t) and was 22–24 ft (6.7–7.3 m) long. The 1.6 hp (1.2 kW) electric motor moved the maiale at 2–3 nmi (3.7–5.6 km; 2.3–3.5 mi) at a maximum depth of 50 ft (15 m). At the target the crew detached a 6 ft (1.8 m)-long warhead with 510 to 570 lb (230 to 260 kg) of explosive, detonated by a timer. The maiale crews the Gamma frogmen wore Belloni rubberised suits with a closed-circuit re-breathing apparatus to avoid bubbles. The Gamma frogmen carried explosive charges, five 9.9 lb (4.5 kg) cimici (bedbugs) or two 26 lb (12 kg) bauletti, (little trunks) and attached them to a ship's hull, with a timed detonation. (Note: Students at the Gamma training school, which began in September 1940, had a stringent ten-month course; about fifty graduates undertook operations during the war.)

==== Motoscafo trasporto lento (MTL) ====
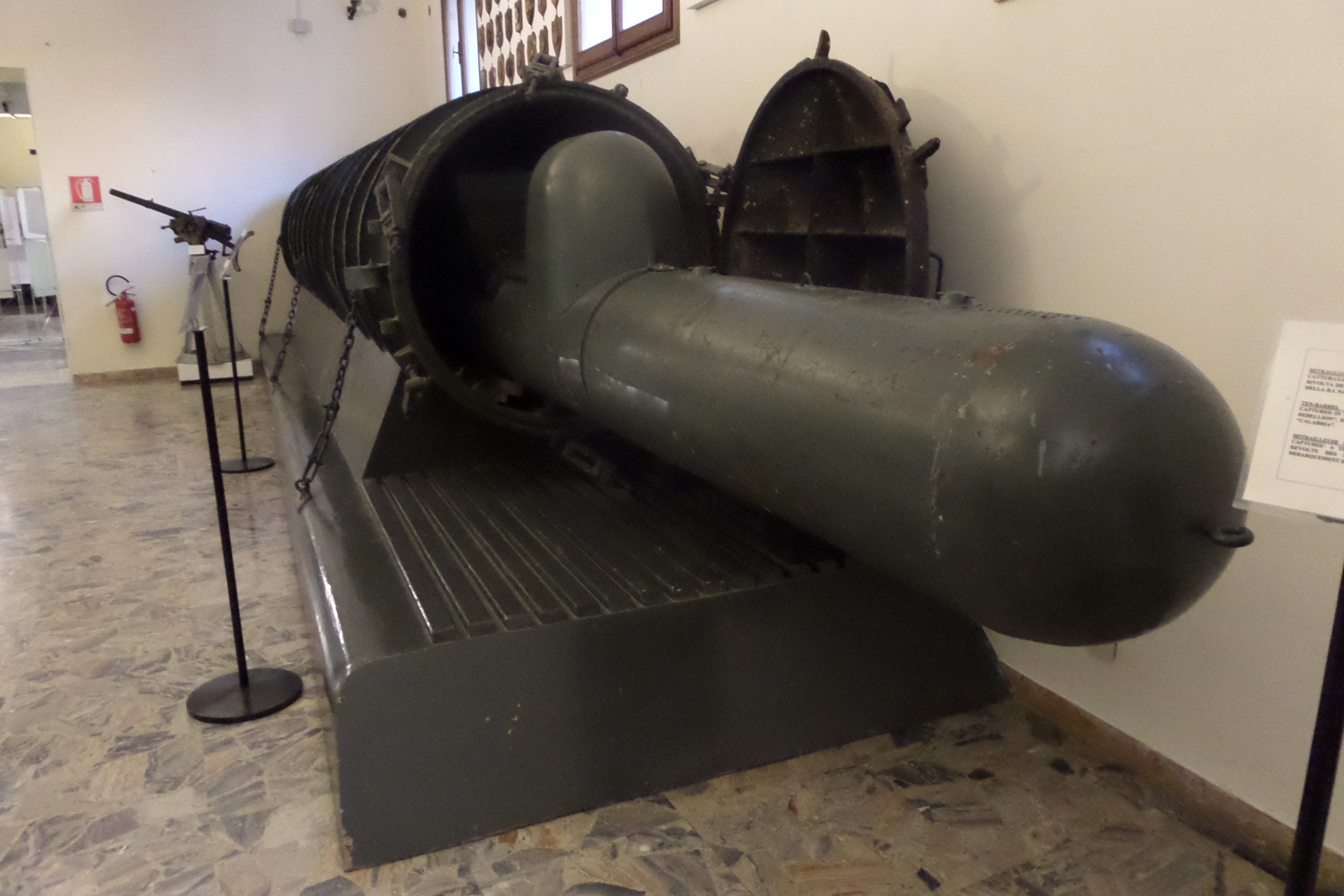
Container for a maiale to be attached to the deck of a submarine

Maiali and SLCs needed transport close to the target because the re-breather lasted no more than six hours and maiali had a range of only 4 nmi (7.4 km; 4.6 mi) at full speed and a maximum of 15 nmi (28 km; 17 mi) at cruising speed. The modified destroyers Francesco Crispi and Quintino Sella, had carried the MTM used in the successful Raid on Souda Bay (25/26 March 1941). The Motoscafo trasporto lento (MTL, slow transport motorboat) was a wooden-hulled boat 28 ft (8.5 m) long by 9 ft 6 in (2.9 m) wide, to carry maiali close to the target. The MTL had a range of only 60 nmi (110 km; 69 mi) cruising at 5 kn (9.3 km/h; 5.8 mph), few were built and they were rarely used. Surface transport gave way to submarines; early in 1940 the Italian submarine Ametista began tests as a maiale transport. The maximum depth of submersion was only 98 ft (30 m); Italian submarine Iride was converted in July 1940 but was sunk on 21 August. Italian submarine Gondar was sunk on 30 September, even though the three maiali cylinders could be flooded, allowing the boat to reach a depth of 295 ft (90 m).

==== Motoscafo turismo (MT/MTM) ====
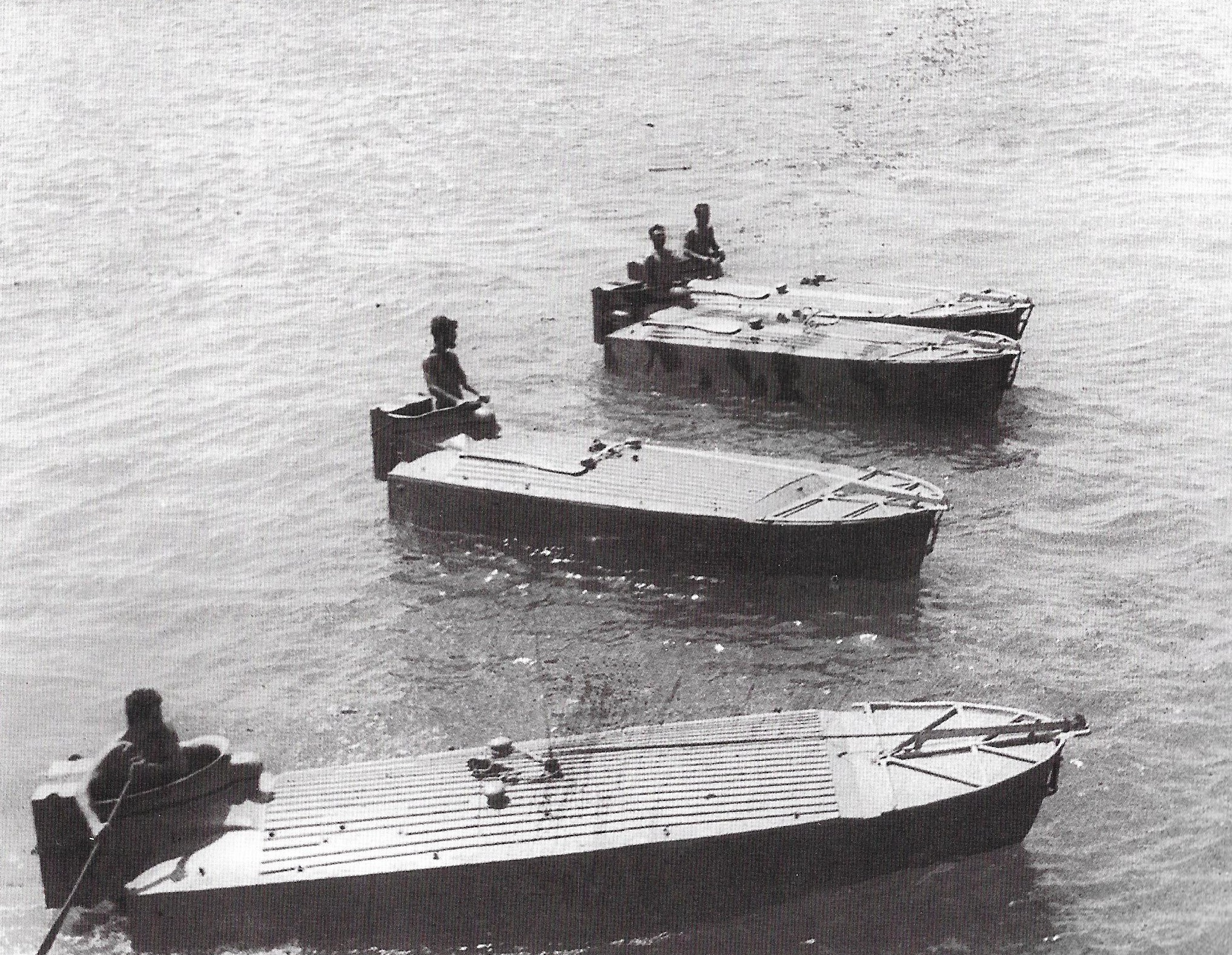
MTM of Decima MAS

The first Motoscafo turismo (MT) that became known as barchini (little boats) were built in late 1938, six MT being delivered in early 1939. An improved version MT Modificato (MTM) tested in November 1940, was 20 ft (6.1 m) long. Both types carried an explosive charge of 660–730 lb (300–330 kg) in the bows at up to 31 kn (57 km/h; 36 mph). The MTM was fitted with a seat back/life raft behind the pilot for him to float on after dropping off the MTM, while waiting to be rescued. Twelve MTs were built and about forty MTMs. Early in 1941, a smaller MT Ridotto was built with a height of 3 ft 9 in (1.14 m) to fit inside the deck cylinders of submarines with the same explosive charge but they were never used in this manner.

==== MT Siluranti (MTS) ====
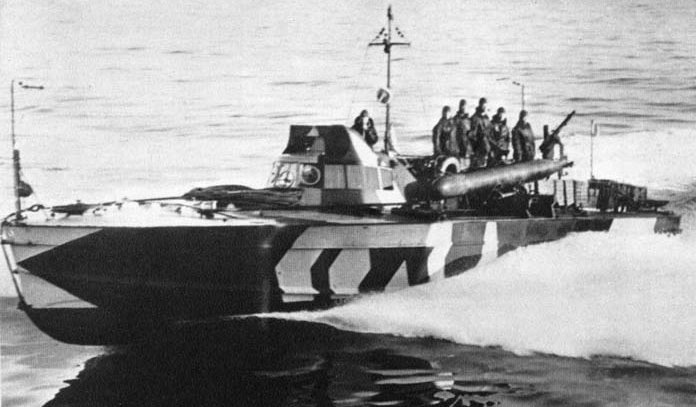
Motoscafo armato silurante

The MT Siluranti (MTS, torpedo motorboat), was a small boat carrying one or two modified 450 mm (18 in) torpedoes, the MTS being more manoeuvrable than the usual Motoscafo armato silurante. The first MTS, of early 1941, could reach 28 kn (52 km/h; 32 mph) with a range of 85 nmi (158 km). The Decima MAS was assisted by Regia Marina MAS boats, which by June 1940, had fifty Class 500 MAS and another 25 in 1941 in four versions. The Class 500 was 61 ft (18.7 m) long by 15 ft (4.7 m) wide at the beam, with a displacement of 21.7–28.9 long tons; 24.3–32.4 short tons (22–29.4 t). The MAS had a crew of 9 to 13 men and had two 18 in (450 mm) torpedoes, 6–10 depth charges and a 13.2 mm (0.52 in) heavy machine-gun (replaced in 1941 with a Breda 20 mm cannon). The MAS could move at 44 kn (81 km/h; 51 mph) and had a range of 348–864 nmi (645–1,600 km).

=== List of decima MAS equipment ===
Decima MAS equipment
Name	Acronym	English translation	Notes
Uomini Gamma	—	Gamma Men	Frogmen sabotage specialists
Motoscafo armato silurante	MAS	Armed torpedo motorboat	Similar to a British Motor torpedo boat (MTB)
Motoscafo turismo	MT	Leisure motorboat	Explosive assault boat, 12 built
Motoscafo trasporto lento	MTL	Slow transport motorboat	Known as Barchini (little boats)
Motoscafo turismo modificato	MTM	Improved explosive assault motorboat	Forty built
Motoscafo turismo ridotto	MTR	Small assault motorboat	
Motoscafo turismo silurante	MTS	Torpedo motorboat	
MTS modificato	MTSM	Improved torpedo motorboat	
Siluro lenta corsa	SLC	Slow human torpedo	

== Combat record ==
The Decima MAS saw action starting on 10 June 1940, when Fascist Italy entered World War II. In more than three years of war, the unit destroyed some 72,190 tons of Allied warships and 130,572 tons of Allied merchant ships. Personnel from the unit seriously damaged the World War I-era Royal Navy battleships HMS Valiant and HMS Queen Elizabeth (both of which were out of action for months), wrecked the heavy cruiser HMS York and the destroyer HMS Eridge, damaged the destroyer HMS Jervis and sank or damaged 20 merchant ships, including supply ships and tankers. During the course of the war, the Decima MAS was awarded the Golden Medal of Military Valour and individual members were awarded a total of 29 Golden Medals of Military Valour, (Note: The highest number awarded to personnel serving in any single unit of the Italian armed forces.) 104 Silver Medals of Military Valour and 33 Bronze Medals of Military Valour.

=== 1940 ===
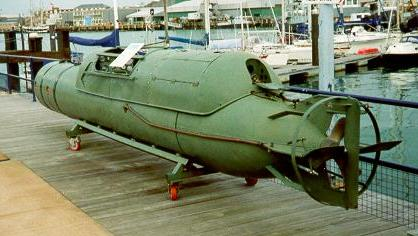
Italian Maiale human torpedo "Siluro San Bartolomeo" displayed at the Royal Navy Submarine Museum, Gosport, UK.

- 10 June 1940: Benito Mussolini declared war on United Kingdom.
- 22 August 1940: While preparing for an attack on the British naval base at Alexandria, Egypt, the Italian submarine Iride (carrying four Maiale and five two-man crews) and the support ship Monte Gargano were attacked and sunk in the Gulf of Bomba off Tobruk, Libya, by British land-based Fairey Swordfish torpedo bombers. Teseo Tesei survived the attack, but casualties among the submarine crew were heavy.
- 21 September 1940: The Italian submarine Gondar departed La Spezia for Alexandria, carrying three Maiale and four two-man crews. The Gondar reached Alexandria on the evening of 30 September, but was spotted by British and Australian destroyers, which attacked. Severely damaged, it was forced to the surface and scuttled by the crew. They were captured, along with the Decima MAS crewmen (including Elios Toschi).
- 24 September 1940: The Italian submarine Sciré, commanded by Commander Junio Valerio Borghese, departed La Spezia carrying three human torpedoes and four crews, for a planned attack on the British naval base at Gibraltar. The operation was cancelled when the British fleet left harbour before the submarine arrived.
- 21 October 1940: Sciré departed La Spezia and sailed again to Gibraltar carrying three human torpedoes and four crews. The Decima MAS frogmen entered the harbour, but were unable to attack any ships due to technical problems with the torpedoes and breathing equipment. Only one human torpedo managed to get close to a target, the battleship Barham. The charge exploded but did not cause significant damage. The two crewmen, Gino Birindelli and Damos Paccagnini, were captured by the British. The other four (including Teseo Tesei) manage to reach Spain and returned to Italy. Valuable experience was gained in this operation by the Decima. Gino Birindelli received the Medaglia d'Oro al Valor Militare (MOVM), his second, Damos Paccagnini received the Medaglia d'Argento al Valore Militare (MAVM).

=== 1941 ===
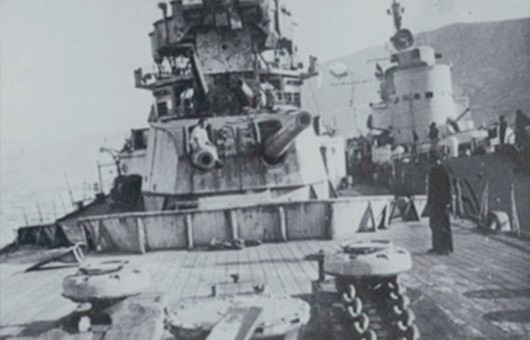
Wreck of HMS York inspected by the crew of the Italian torpedo boat Sirio, moored alongside

- 25 March 1941: The Italian destroyers Francesco Crispi and Quintino Sella departed Leros island in the Aegean at night, each carrying 3 small (2-ton) Motoscafo da Turismo motor assault boats of the Decima MAS. Each MT (nicknamed barchini or "little boats") carried a 300 kg (660 lb) explosive charge in its bow. The one-pilot craft were launched by the destroyers 10 miles off Suda Bay, Crete, where several British Royal Navy warships and auxiliary ships were at anchor. The MTs were specially equipped to make their way through obstacles such as torpedo nets; the pilot steered the assault craft in a collision course at his target ship, and jumped from his boat before impact and warhead detonation. Once inside the bay, the six boats located their targets: the heavy cruiser HMS York, a large tanker (the Norwegian Pericles of 8,300 tons), another tanker, and a cargo ship. Two MTMs hit York amidships, flooding her aft boilers and magazines. Pericles was severely damaged and settled on the bottom, while the other tanker and the cargo ship were sunk. The other barchini apparently missed their intended targets, and one of them was stranded on the beach. All six of the Italian sailors were captured. The disabled York was later scuttled in shallow waters with demolition charges by her crew before the German capture of Crete, while Pericles sank in April 1941 en route to Alexandria.
- 25 May 1941: The Sciré departed La Spezia carrying three human torpedoes. At Cádiz, Spain it secretly embarked eight Decima MAS crewmen. At Gibraltar, they found no warships because Renown, Ark Royal, and Sheffield had been ordered to the Atlantic to hunt the German battleship Bismarck. The torpedoes once again experienced technical problems as they unsuccessfully attempted to attack a freighter. The crew returned to Italy via Spain.
- 26 June 1941: An attack on Malta similar to the 26 July 1941 operation (see below) was planned but was canceled due to bad weather.

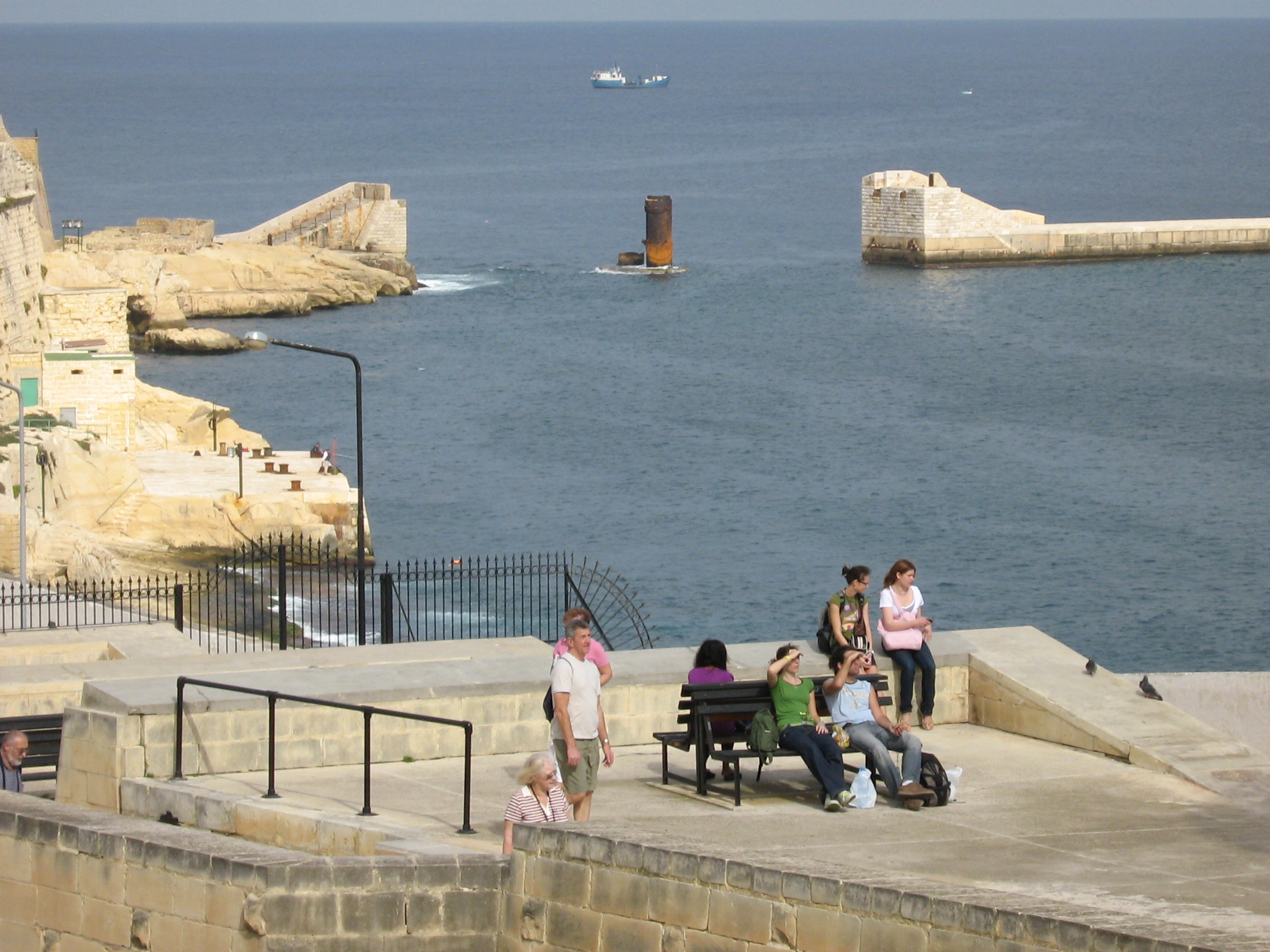
The remains of St. Elmo Bridge in Valletta, which was destroyed in the attack of 26 July 1941

- 26 July 1941: Two Maiale and ten MAS boats (including six barchini) unsuccessfully attacked the port of Valletta, Malta. The force was detected early on by a British radar installation, but the British coastal batteries held their fire until the Italians approached to close range. Fifteen Decima MAS crewmen were killed (including Commander Moccagatta), and 18 were captured. Teseo Tesei and Petty Officer Alcide Pedretti on one torpedo died by Fort St. Elmo as they attempted to destroy the outer defenses of the harbour. Lieutenant Franco Costa and sergeant Luigi Barla on the other torpedo became lost, scuttled their craft, and swam ashore at St. George's Bay two miles NW of Valletta. Their Maiale was recovered by the British, becoming the first example they had been able to examine. All 6 MTMs, both SLCs and two MAS (MAS 451 and MAS 452) boats were lost, one of them being found adrift in open seas by the British and towed to port by a seaplane. This disaster forced the unit to make a huge reassessment of its operations. Commander Ernesto Forza was named as commander of the Decima MAS, and Borghese became leader of the sub-surface weapons group.
- 10 September 1941: The Sciré departed La Spezia carrying three human torpedoes. At Cádiz, Spain, it secretly embarked eight crewmen for them. At Gibraltar, the torpedoes sank three ships: the tankers Denbydale and Fiona Shell, and the cargo ship Durham. All six crewmen swam to Spain and returned safely to Italy, where they were decorated, as were the crew of Sciré.
- 3 December 1941: Sciré departed La Spezia carrying three human torpedoes to conduct what became the Raid on Alexandria (1941). At the island of Leros in the Aegean Sea, six Decima MAS crewmen came aboard, including Lieutenant Luigi Durand de la Penne. On 18 December Sciré released the torpedoes 1.3 miles from Alexandria commercial harbour, and they entered the harbour when the British opened the boom defence to let three of their destroyers pass. After many difficulties, de la Penne and his crewmate Emilio Bianchi successfully attached a limpet mine under HMS Valiant, but had to surface as they attempted to leave, and were captured. They refused to answer when questioned and were detained in a compartment aboard Valiant. Fifteen minutes before the explosion, de la Penne asked to speak to the Valiant's captain and informed him of the imminent explosion but refused to give other information. He was returned to the compartment and neither he nor Bianchi were injured by the detonation of the mine. The other four torpedo-riders were also captured, but their mines seriously damaged Valiant and the battleship Queen Elizabeth, sank the Norwegian tanker Sagona, and badly damaged the destroyer HMS Jervis. The two battleships were subsequently repaired, but were out of action for over a year.

=== 1942 ===
- 29 April 1942: The Italian submarine Ambra departed La Spezia carrying three human torpedoes. At Leros six crewmen were secretly loaded for them. On 14 May Ambra reached Alexandria and sank a British floating dock. The Ambra was spotted and could not sink anything. All six torpedo-riders were captured.
- July 1942: Italian frogmen set up a secret base in the Italian tanker Olterra which was interned in Algeciras near Gibraltar. All materials had to be moved secretly through Spain and this limited operations.
- 13 July 1942: Twelve Italian frogmen swam from the Algeciras coast into Gibraltar harbour and set explosives, and then returned safely. Four ships were sunk.
- 10 August 1942: The Italian submarine Scirè was sunk by HMS Islay while attempting to attack the port of Haifa in British Palestine. She had 11 frogmen on board.
- 29 August 1942: Off El Daba, Egypt. The Hunt-class destroyer HMS Eridge was torpedoed at close range by an MTSM, a torpedo-carrying version of the MTM. Six of her crew were lost. HMS Eridge was towed to Alexandria, but soon after was declared a "constructive total loss", and was scrapped in 1946.
- 4 December 1942: The Ambra left La Spezia to attack Algiers, carrying frogmen and two human torpedoes. Ten frogmen carrying limpet mines swam with the human torpedoes, but because of the distance, they did not reach the harbour, but attacked ships outside it, sank two and damaged two others.
- 17 December 1942: Six Italians on three torpedoes left the Olterra to attack the three British warships Nelson, Formidable, and Furious in Gibraltar. A British patrol boat killed one torpedo's crew (Lt. Visintini and Petty Officer Magro) with a depth charge. Their bodies were recovered, and their swimfins were taken and used by two of Gibraltar's British guard divers. Another British patrol boat spotted another torpedo, and chased and shot at it and captured its two crewmen. The remaining torpedo returned to the Olterra without its rear rider.

=== 1943 ===
- 8 May 1943: Three Italian human torpedoes left the Olterra to attack Gibraltar in bad weather and sank two British freighters and an American Liberty ship. All returned safely to the Olterra.

This drawing shows the Norwegian tanker Thorshøvdi, broken in two by human torpedoes launched from the Italian base-ship Olterra, August 1943

- May 1943: Borghese becomes unit commander when Forza returned to sea
- 25 July 1943: Italian dictator Benito Mussolini was replaced by Field Marshal Pietro Badoglio as the head of the Italian Government.
- 9 July 1943: Xª MAS single frogman sank or crippled the ship Kaituna (4,917 tons) at Mersin in Turkey.
- 3 August 1943: In the evening, three Italian human torpedoes left the Olterra to attack Gibraltar. They sank three cargo ships, one of them an American Liberty and returned to the Olterra. One of the Italian divers was captured.
- 1 August 1943: Xª MAS single frogman sank or crippled the Norwegian cargo ship Fernplant (7,000 tons) at İskenderun in Turkey.

=== Armistice ===
- 8 September 1943: The new Badoglio government of Italy signed an armistice with the Allies. The Olterra was towed into Gibraltar, and the British found what had happened in it. Further attacks on Gibraltar using the new and larger replacement for the SLC (the Siluro San Bartolomeo type), and a planned raid on New York City were called off due to the Italian surrender.

=== Summary of Allied ships sunk or damaged by Decima MAS ===
Date	Place	Notes
26 March 1941	Suda Bay	Cruiser HMS York (8,250 t standard displacement) (Note: Disabled by two MT explosive speedboats piloted by Lt.(jg) Angelo Cabrini and SCPO Tullio Tedeschi. Abandoned and never repaired.) Tanker Pericles (8,234 t) (Note: Sunk by an MT explosive speedboat piloted by PO2 Lino Beccati.)
19 September 1941	Gibraltar	Tanker Denby Dale (8,145 t) (Note: Sunk by an explosive charge positioned by the human torpedo piloted by Lt.(jg) Licio Visintini and PO1 Giovanni Magro.) Tanker Fiona Shell (2,445 t) (Note: Disabled by an explosive charge positioned by the human torpedo piloted by Lt.(jg) Amedeo Vesco and PO1 Antonio Zozzoli. Later repaired and returned to service.) Motorship Durham (10,900 t) (Note: Damaged by an explosive charge positioned by the human torpedo piloted by Lt.(jg) Decio Catalano and PO1 Giuseppe Giannoni. Later repaired and returned to service.)
19 December 1941	Alexandria	Battleship HMS Queen Elizabeth (30,600 t) (Note: Sunk in shallow water by an explosive charge positioned by the human torpedo piloted by Lt.(jg) Antonio Marceglia and PO1 Spartaco Schergat. Later raised from the bottom and repaired.) Battleship HMS Valiant (30,600 t) (Note: Sunk in shallow water by an explosive charge positioned by the human torpedo piloted by Lt.(jg) Luigi Durand De La Penne and MCPO Emilio Bianchi. Later raised from the bottom and repaired.) Tanker Sagona (7,554 t) (Note: Damaged by an explosive charge positioned by the human torpedo piloted by Lt.(jg) Vittorio Martellotta and PO1 Mario Marino. Later repaired and returned to service.) Destroyer HMS Jervis (1,690 t) (Note: Damaged by an explosive charge positioned by the human torpedo piloted by Lt.(jg) Vittorio Martellotta and PO1 Mario Marino. Repaired and returned to service.)
13 June 1942	Sebastopol	Military transport (USSR) (Note: Damaged by MTSM 210 torpedo speedboat piloted by Lt.(jg) Aldo Massarini and PO1 Eliodoro Grillo. Later sunk by German aircraft while being towed back to port.)
14 July 1942	Gibraltar	Steamship Meta (1,575 t) (Note: All damaged by limpet mines positioned by assault frogmen (Lt.(jg) Agostino Straulino and Giorgio Baucier, SCPO Alfredo Schiavoni, PO1 Alessandro Bianchini, E4 Giovanni Lucchetti, Carlo Del Valle, Giuseppe Ferodi, Vago Giari and Evideo Boscolo, E3 Bruno Di Lorenzo, Rodolfo Lugano and Carlo Bucovaz).) SS Empire Snipe (2,497 t) (Note: Repaired and returned to service in October 1942.) Steamship Shuma (1,494 t) Steamship Baron Douglas (3,899 t)
29 August 1942	El Daba	Destroyer HMS Eridge (1,050 t) (Note: Disabled by MTSM 210 torpedo speedboat piloted by Lt.(jg) Piero Carminati and E4 Cesare Sani, never repaired.)
15 September 1942	Gibraltar	Steamship Raven's Point (1,787 t) (Note: Sunk by limpet mines positioned by assault frogman E3 Bruno Di Lorenzo.)
12 December 1942	Algiers	Steamship Ocean Vanquisher (7,174 t) (Note: Sunk during a combined raid of human torpedoes (Lt.(jg) Giulio Arena and E4 Ferdinando Cocchi; Ens. Giorgio Reggioli and E4 Colombo Pamolli) and assault frogmen (Lt.(jg) Agostino Morello, PO1 Oreste Botti, E4 Giuseppe Ferodi and Evideo Boscolo, Sgt. (Army) Luigi Rolfini and Alberto Evangelisti).) Steamship Berta (1,493 t) (Note: Sunk) Steamship Armattan (6,587 t) Tanker Empire Centaur (7,041 t) (repaired) USN Military Transport N.59
8 May 1943	Gibraltar	Steamship Pat Harrison (U.S.) (7,191 t) (Note: All disabled by explosive charges positioned by three human torpedoes (Lt.Ernesto Notari and E4 Ario Lazzari; Lt.(jg) Camillo Tadini and E4 Salvatore Mattera; Lt.(jg) Vittorio Cella and E4 Eusebio Montalenti.) Steamship Mahsud (7,540 t) Steamship Camerata (4875 t)
30 June 1943	İskenderun	Motorship Orion (Greek) (7,000 t) (Note: Sunk by limpet mines positioned by assault frogman Lt. (Blackshirts) Luigi Ferraro.)
9 July 1943	Mersin	Motorship Kaituna (4914 t)
1 August 1943	İskenderun	Motorship Fernplant (Norwegian) (7000 t)
4 August 1943	Gibraltar	Steamship Harrison Gray Otis (U.S.) (7,176 t) (Note: Sunk by an explosive charge positioned by the human torpedo piloted by Lt. Ernesto Notari and E4 Andrea Gianoli.) Steamship Stanridge (5,975 t) (Note: Sunk by an explosive charge positioned by the human torpedo piloted by Lt.(jg) Camillo Tadini and E4 Salvatore Matera.) Tanker Thorshøvdi (Norwegian) (9,944 t) (Note: Sunk by an explosive charge positioned by the human torpedo piloted by Lt.(jg) Vittorio Cella and E4 Eusebio Montalenti.)

== Successor units ==
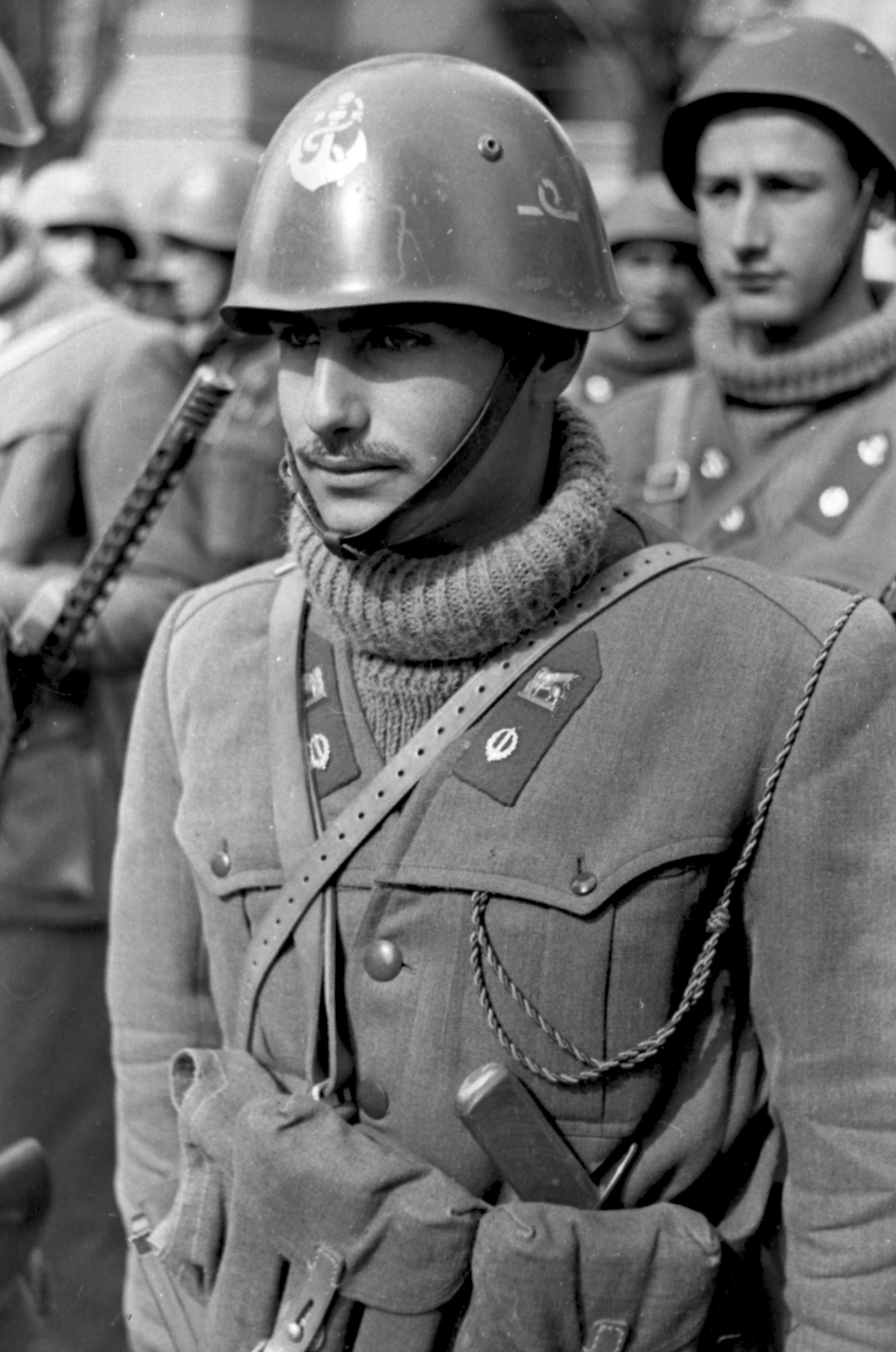
Guardiamarina (Ensign) of the Barbarigo Battalion standing in viale Carso near piazza Bainsizza, in Rome, during a review parade by General der Luftwaffe Kurt Mälzer before being sent to face the Allied beachhead at Anzio-Nettuno, March 1944.

Following the armistice of Italy on 8 September 1943, the Xª MAS was disbanded. The Badoglio government in the south of Italy under Allied occupation declared war on Germany and became a co-belligerent. Some Decima MAS sailors joined the Allied cause to fight against Nazi Germany and what remained of the Axis as part of the Italian Co-Belligerent Navy. A new unit was formed, led by Forza and joined by some of the pioneers such as de la Penne newly released from British POW camps. The new unit was named Mariassalto, but continued to be an elite naval force mounting special operations at sea.

In the German-occupied north of Italy. Mussolini set up the Italian Social Republic (Repubblica Sociale Italiana, or RSI) to continue the war as part of the Axis. Led by Borghese, Decima Flottiglia was revived, as part of the National Republican Navy (Marina Nazionale Repubblicana) of the RSI with its headquarters in Caserma del Muggiano, La Spezia. By the end of the war, it had over 18,000 members, and although Borghese conceived it as a purely naval unit, it gained a reputation as a savage pro-fascist, anti-communist, anti-resistance force in land campaigns alongside the German forces, under the command of SS General Karl Wolff.

=== Mariassalto ===
Mariassalto
- Active: October 1943–26 April 1945
- Country: Kingdom of Italy
- Branch: Italian Co-Belligerent Navy
- Type: Naval commandos
- Role: Human torpedo Raiding; Sabotage
- Equipment: Chariot
- Engagements: Raid on Genoa; Raid on La Spezia

Commanders
- Notable commanders: Ernesto Forza

The Mariassalto was set up at Taranto alongside the British frogman force in the Mediterranean. Forza was pleased to demonstrate Italian expertise in this area to the British, and the group was also keen to be in action, though if they were caught they would almost certainly have been shot.

In June 1944 came an opportunity to take action, in Operation QWZ, a joint mission against targets in La Spezia harbour. The attack was against the Italian cruisers Bolzano and Gorizia, which had been taken by the Germans after the Italian surrender. This was to thwart a German plan to sink them where they would block the harbour entrance. The mission also aimed to attack German U-boats in the harbour. British chariots would attack the cruisers whilst Mariassalto's Gamma Frogmen would attack U-boats penned in the harbour. On 2 June 1944 the Italian destroyer Grecale sailed from Bastia in Corsica to La Spezia carrying three speedboats, and Italian frogmen including Luigi Durand De La Penne, and two British chariots. One chariot broke down and was abandoned, though the other successfully sank Bolzano. However, the Gamma men were unsuccessful in their attack on the U-boat pens. All the participants escaped, linking with partisan groups on land.

In April 1945 a final mission, Operation Toast, was planned. This was aimed at sinking the newly converted shipping liner now the aircraft carrier Aquila, just completed in Genoa. For this Mariassalto men would make use of two British chariots, as they had none of their own SLCs available. On 18 April 1945 the destroyer Legionario, carrying two high-speed motorboats equipped with chariots sailed from Venice for Genoa led by Captain Chavasse SOE and Forza. Both chariots were deployed and succeeded in penetrating the defences but found the hull of Aquila so encrusted with barnacles and seaweed the limpet mines could not be attached to it. The frogmen had to lay the charges on the seafloor of the outer harbour mole and when the charge exploded as planned the ship remained afloat in spite of the attack. All of the frogmen escaped safely. The German commander never put his extensive demolition plans for Genoa into action and thus Aquila was never sunk as a blockade to the harbour.

=== Decima MAS (RSI) ===
Decima Flottiglia MAS
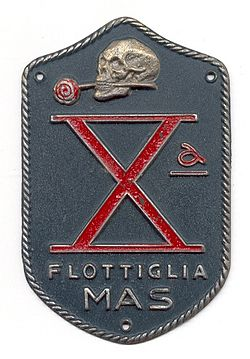
- Active: September 1943–26 April 1945
- Country: Italian Social Republic
- Branch: Navy
- Type: Marines; Naval commandos
- Role: Amphibious warfare Anti-partisan; Close-quarters combat Counter-insurgency; Counterintelligence; Direct action Raiding; Reconnaissance; Sabotage
- Nickname: Xª MAS
- Motto: Memento Audere Semper (Remember to dare always)
- Engagements: World War II

Commanders
- Notable commanders: Junio Valerio Borghese

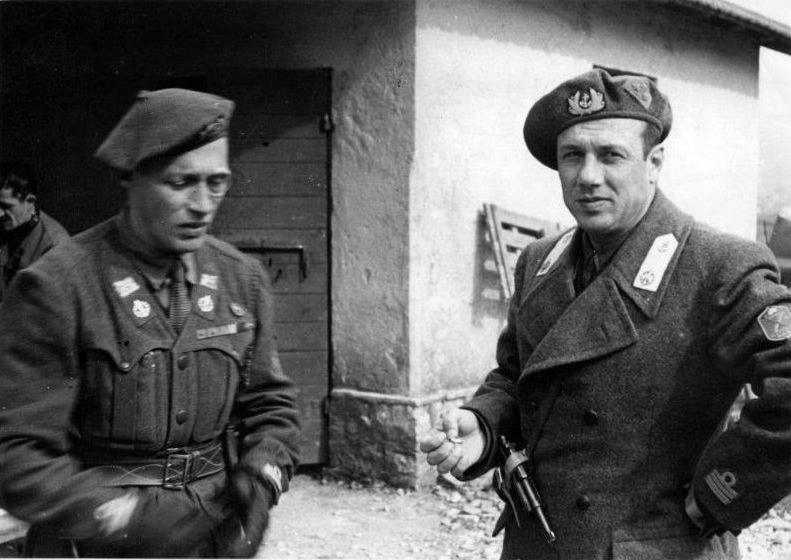
Junio Valerio Borghese (right) and Umberto Bardelli of the Decima MAS.

Some Xª MAS men who were in German-occupied Italy remained part of the Axis forces, joining the Italian Social Republic under the command of Captain Borghese. His reputation and that of the Xª MAS enabled him to negotiate an agreement with the German forces that gave the Xª MAS significant autonomy, allowed them to fight under an Italian flag (under the command of the Germans), and not to be employed against other Italians. Borghese was recognized as the leader of the corps.

==== Ideology ====
The main themes in the Xª MAS's ideology became "honour" in defending Italy from the "betrayal" of the armistice with the Allies and a call to defend the territorial integrity of Italy against the Allies. The corps had its own weekly magazine, L'orizzonte ("The Horizon"), in which authors such as Giovanni Preziosi wrote vehemently anti-Semitic articles about Jewish conspiracies. The magazine had problems in its distribution, as it was thought that Borghese's popularity among the Fascist hardliners might reduce Mussolini's influence.

==== Hymn ====
Quando pareva vinta Roma antica,
sorse l'invitta decima legione;
vinse sul campo il barbaro nemico,
Roma riebbe pace con onore;
quando l'ignobil 8 di settembre,
abbandonò la patria il traditore,
sorse dal mar la decima flottiglia,
che prese l'armi al grido "per l'onore!".

Decima flottiglia nostra,
che beffasti l'inghilterra,
vittoriosa ad Alessandria,
Malta, Suda e Gibilterra;
vittoriosa già sul mare,
ora pure sulla terra,
vincerai!

Navi d'Italia che ci foste tolte,
non in battaglia, ma col tradimento,
nostri fratelli prigionieri o morti,
noi vi facciamo questo giuramento:
noi vi giuriamo che ritorneremo,
là dove Dio volle il tricolore;
noi vi giuriamo che combatteremo,
fin quando avremo pace con onore.

Decima flottiglia nostra,
che beffasti l'inghilterra,
vittoriosa ad Alessandria,
Malta, Algeri e Gibilterra;
vittoriosa già sul mare,
ora pure sulla terra,
vincerai!

Translation:

When ancient Rome seemed defeated,
the invincible Tenth Legion arose;
on the battlefield it defeated the barbarian enemy,
Rome regained peace with honor.
When, on the ignoble 8th of September,
the traitor abandoned the Fatherland,
from the sea arose the Tenth Flotilla,
which took up arms shouting “For Honor!”
Our Tenth Flotilla,
that mocked England,
victorious at Alexandria,
Malta, Souda and Gibraltar;
victorious already on the sea,
now also on land,
you shall win!
Italian ships stolen from us,
not in battle but by betrayal,
our brothers prisoners or dead,
we make this solemn vow to you:
We swear we shall return
where God wanted the Tricolour to fly;
We swear we shall fight
until we achieve peace with honor.
Our Tenth Flotilla,
that mocked England,
victorious at Alexandria,
Malta, Algiers and Gibraltar;
victorious already on the sea,
now also on land,
you shall win!

==== Relations with the RSI ====
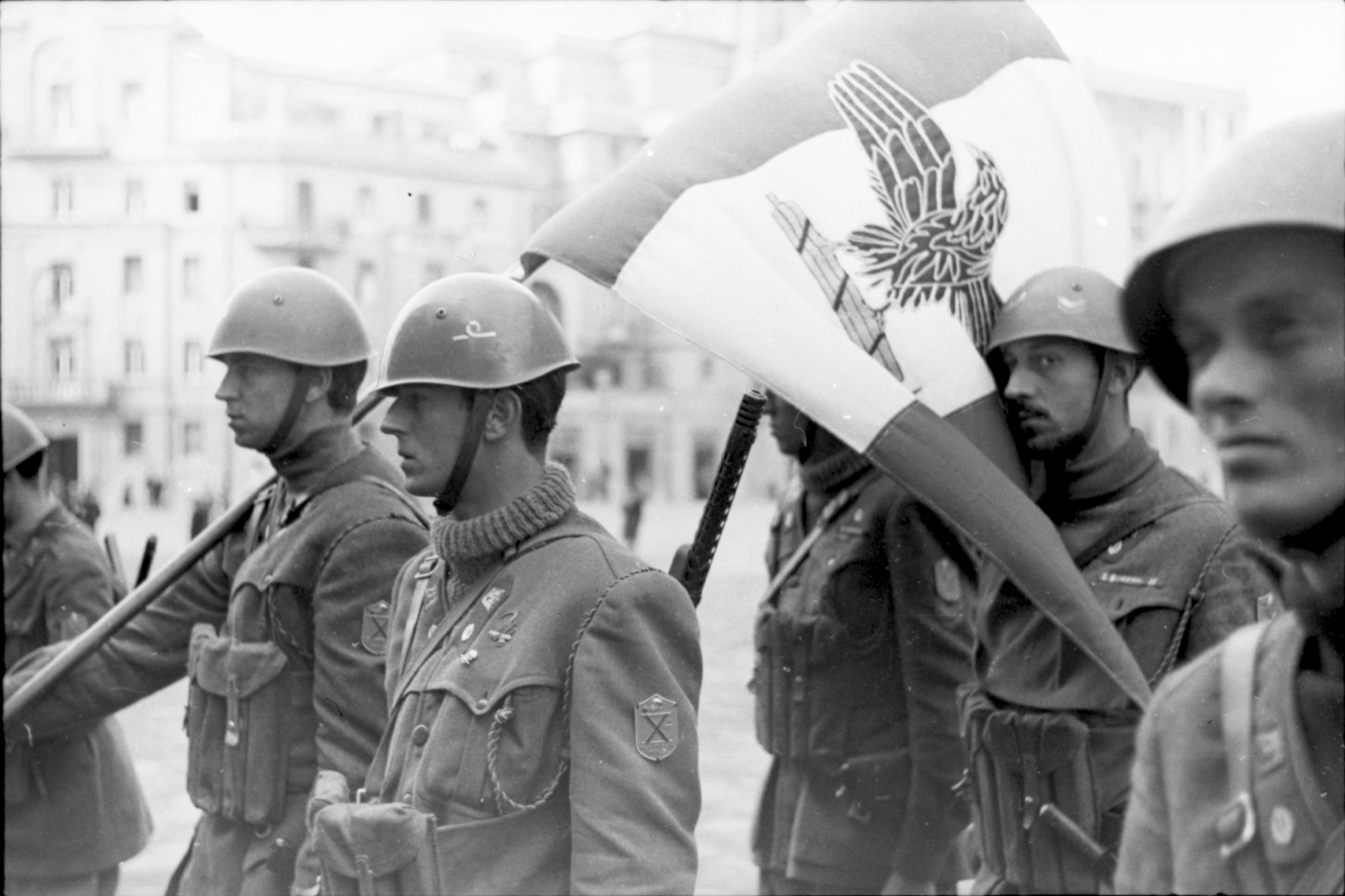
Marines of the Decima, in 1944

Relationships with the Italian Social Republic were not easy. On 14 January 1944 Benito Mussolini arrested Borghese while receiving him in Gargnano, in order to gain direct control of the Xª MAS. Word of the arrest reached the officers of the Decima, who considered marching on Mussolini's capital at Salò. However, the German command used their influence to have Borghese released, as they needed the equipment, expertise and manpower of the Xª MAS as an anti-partisan force.

==== Naval actions ====
The Xª MAS (RSI) took little part in the war at sea. Its equipment had been abandoned in the south, and its naval activities were frustrated by Allied action. In November 1944 four frogmen (Malacarne, Sorgetti, Bertoncin, Pavone), who had stayed under German command, were delivered by fast motorboat and swam into Livorno harbor to set up a secret sabotage base, but were captured.

==== Anti-partisan actions ====
Ferruccio Nazionale, Italian partisan hanged by the Xª MAS in Ivrea. The sign says: "He attempted to shoot the Decima"

The Decima was mostly employed in anti-partisan actions on land, rather than against the Allies at sea. Their actions were mostly reprisals following the massacre of soldiers of "Decima" by partisans– see Bardelli's homicide. Their anti-partisan actions usually took place in small villages, where the partisans were stronger.

- Forno 68 persons, civilians and some partisans, were killed by SS men and Xª MAS forces.
- Guadine Random violence to terrorize a population believed to be supporting the rebels, almost complete destruction of the village by fire.
- Borgo Ticino Together with the SS, murdered 12 civilians, pillage and destruction of the village by fire because three German soldiers had been wounded by partisans.
- Castelletto Ticino To give a demonstration of firmness against crime, an Xª MAS officer had five petty criminals publicly shot, in front of a large crowd.
- Crocetta del Montello: Episodes of torture with whips and gasoline and summary executions of partisans.

==== Defense of Italian national borders ====
However, the Xª MAS units also earned a good combat reputation fighting on the frontline against the Allies at Anzio and on the Gothic Line. In the last months of the war Xª MAS units were dispatched to the eastern Italian border against Josip Broz Tito's partisans who marched into Istria and Venezia Giulia.

==== Demobilization ====
On 26 April 1945, in what is now the Piazza della Repubblica in Milan, Borghese finally ordered the Xª MAS to disband. He was soon arrested by partisans, but rescued by OSS officer James Angleton, who dressed him in an American uniform and drove him to Rome for interrogation by the Allies. Borghese was tried and convicted of war crimes, and sentenced to 12 years imprisonment, but was released from jail by the Italian Supreme Court in 1949. The Americans were keenly interested in infiltrating the Italian Communist groups, something which Borghese had done, and he was enlisted to help create counterintelligence units for the Americans.

==== Organization of RSI X^{a} MAS ====
- Naval units
  - Combat swimmers and frogmen
- 1st Combat Group
  - 'Barbarigo', 'Lupo' battalions
  - 'Nuotatori Paracadutisti' Parachute battalion
  - 'Colleoni' artillery battalion
  - 'Freccia' Engineer battalion – 1st company only
- 2nd Combat Group
  - 'Valanga' Assault Engineer battalion
  - 'Sagittario', 'Freccia', and 'Fulmine' battalions
  - 'Castagnacci' recruitment and replacement battalion
  - 'Da Giussano' artillery battalion
  - 'Freccia' engineer battalion – 2nd and 3rd companies
- 8 independent infantry battalions
- 5 independent infantry companies
- Women's Auxiliary Service

== After 1945 ==
In 2006 the admiralty of the Italian republic recognized the Xth M.A.S. RSI veterans as combatants of WWII and gave the association the battle flag.

Counter-operations against Italian frogmen by British frogmen in Gibraltar was the subject of a 1958 British film The Silent Enemy based on the exploits of the team of Lionel Crabb.

Today the Comando Raggruppamento Subacquei e Incursori Teseo Tesei is the frogman corp currently serving the Italian Republic.

== In popular culture ==
- The Decima MAS' Gibraltar operations are depicted in the 1952 Italian film I sette dell'Orsa maggiore and the 1958 British film The Silent Enemy.
- The Uniforms of the Decima Flottiglia MAS are used by the collaborationists in the film Salò o le 120 giornate di Sodoma.
- The Raid on Alexandria in 1941 is depicted in the 1962 British film The Valiant.
- In the Italian film My Brother is an Only Child, set in the 1960s, a young Communist refers to the Decima Mas, and their "dungeon" on Via Tasso.

Prince Valerio Borghese escaped capital punishment after the war (thanks to James Jesus Angleton of the CIA) in the cold war context and remained an active neo-fascist activist: He attempted a failed fascist coup in the early 1970s (the infamous golpe Borghese). The Golpe Borghese and its leader are spoofed in a film by Mario Monicelli called Vogliamo i Colonelli (We want the Colonels) where Borghese part is played by Italian actor Ugo Tognazzi impersonating an ultra right-wing parliament representative called Tritoni (Triton or Newt). One of the best scenes features a boisterous and crazy assault diver and parachute Commando frogman called Barbacane (Giuseppe Maffioli).

== See also ==
- Italian auxiliary ship Olterra – Undercover Italian auxiliary ship from World War II
- Brandenburgers – Members of the German Brandenburg special forces unit during WWII
- Fukuryu – Japanese divers intended to manually detonate mines on invading ships
- Comando Raggruppamento Subacquei e Incursori Teseo Tesei – Italian special forces diving unit, the COMSUBIN
- MAS (motorboat) – Boat used by the Italian Royal Navy
- Military history of Gibraltar during World War II
- Military history of Italy during World War II
