= HMS Queen Elizabeth (1913) =

Queen Elizabeth-class battleship

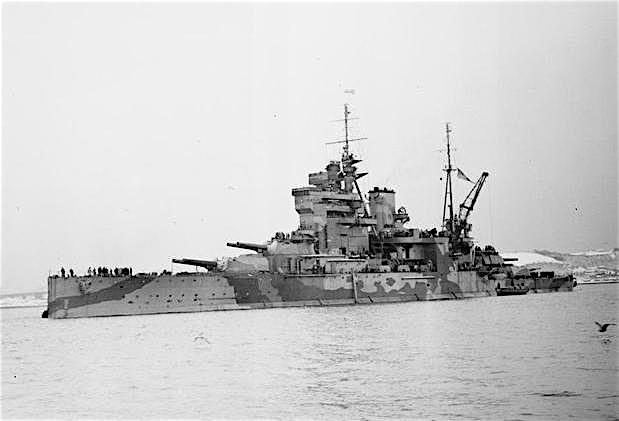
- Queen Elizabeth in the Firth of Forth during the Second World War

History

United Kingdom
- Name: Queen Elizabeth
- Namesake: Elizabeth I
- Builder: HM Dockyard, Portsmouth
- Cost: £3,014,103
- Laid down: 21 October 1912
- Launched: 16 October 1913
- Completed: January 1914
- Commissioned: 22 December 1914
- Decommissioned: 1948
- Stricken: 7 July 1948
- Identification: Pennant number: 10 (1914); 97 (Jan 18); 00 (Apr 18)
- Motto: Semper Eadem ("Always the Same")
- Fate: Scrapped, 1948
- Badge

General characteristics (as built)
- Class & type: Queen Elizabeth-class battleship
- Displacement: 32,590 long tons (33,113 t); 33,260 long tons (33,790 t) (Deep load)
- Length: 639 ft 9 in (195 m)
- Beam: 90 ft 7 in (27.6 m)
- Draught: 33 ft (10.1 m)
- Installed power: 24 Babcock & Wilcox boilers; 75,000 shp (56,000 kW)
- Propulsion: 4 shafts; 2 steam turbine sets
- Speed: 24 knots (44 km/h; 28 mph)
- Range: 5,000 nmi (9,260 km; 5,750 mi) at 12 knots (22 km/h; 14 mph)
- Complement: 1,262 (1920, as a flagship)
- Armament: 4 × twin 15 in (381 mm) guns; 16 × single 6 in (152 mm) guns; 2 × single 3 in (76 mm) AA guns; 4 × 21 in (533 mm) torpedo tubes
- Armour: Waterline belt: 13 in (330 mm); Deck: 1–3 in (25–76 mm); Barbettes: 7–10 in (178–254 mm); Gun turrets: 11–13 in (279–330 mm); Conning tower: 13 in (330 mm)

HMS Queen Elizabeth was the lead ship of her class of five dreadnought battleships built for the Royal Navy in the early 1910s, and was often used as a flagship. She served in the First World War as part of the Grand Fleet, and participated in the inconclusive action of 19 August 1916. Her service during the war generally consisted of routine patrols and training in the North Sea. She and the other super-dreadnought battleships were the first of their type to be powered by oil instead of coal. Queen Elizabeth later served in several theatres during the Second World War, and was scrapped in 1948.

== Design and description ==
The Queen Elizabeth-class ships were designed to form a fast squadron for the fleet that was intended to operate against the leading ships of the opposing battleline. This required maximum offensive power and a speed several knots faster than any other battleship to allow them to defeat any type of ship.

=== Ship measures and propulsion ===
Queen Elizabeth had a length overall of 639 feet 9 inches (195 m), a beam of 90 feet 7 inches (27.6 m) and a deep draught of 33 feet (10.1 m). She had a normal displacement of 32,590 long tons (33,113 t) and displaced 33,260 long tons (33,794 t) at deep load. She was powered by two sets of Parsons steam turbines, each driving two shafts using steam from 24 Babcock & Wilcox boilers. The turbines were rated at 75,000 shaft horsepower (56,000 kW) and intended to reach a maximum speed of 25 knots (46.3 km/h; 28.8 mph). The ship had a range of 5,000 nautical miles (9,260 km; 5,754 mi) at a cruising speed of 12 knots (22.2 km/h; 13.8 mph). Her crew numbered 1,262 officers and ratings in 1920 while serving as a flagship.

=== Armament, sensors and fire control ===
The Queen Elizabeth class was equipped with eight breech-loading (BL) 15-inch (381 mm) Mk I guns in four twin-gun turrets, in two superfiring pairs fore and aft of the superstructure, designated 'A', 'B', 'X', and 'Y' from front to rear. Twelve of the fourteen BL 6-inch (152 mm) Mk XII guns were mounted in casemates along the broadside of the vessel amidships; the remaining pair were mounted on the forecastle deck near the aft funnel and were protected by gun shields. The anti-aircraft (AA) armament were composed of two quick-firing (QF) 3-inch (76 mm) 20 cwt Mk I (Note: "Cwt" is the abbreviation for hundredweight, 20 cwt referring to the weight of the gun.) guns. The ships were fitted with four submerged 21-inch (533 mm) torpedo tubes, two on each broadside. Queen Elizabeth was completed with two fire-control directors fitted with 15-foot (4.6 m) rangefinders. One was mounted above the conning tower, protected by an armoured hood, and the other was in the spotting top above the tripod foremast. Each turret was also fitted with a 15-foot rangefinder. The main armament could be controlled by 'B' turret as well. The secondary armament was primarily controlled by directors mounted on each side of the compass platform on the foremast once they were fitted in March 1917, although one temporary director was fitted in November–December 1916.

=== Armour ===
The waterline belt of the Queen Elizabeth class consisted of Krupp cemented armour (KC) that was 13 inches (330 mm) thick over the ships' vitals. The gun turrets were protected by 11 to 13 inches (279 to 330 mm) of KC armour and were supported by barbettes 7–10 inches (178–254 mm) thick. The ships had multiple armoured decks that ranged from 1 to 3 inches (25 to 76 mm) in thickness. The main conning tower was protected by 13 inches of armour. After the Battle of Jutland, 1 inch of high-tensile steel was added to the main deck over the magazines and additional anti-flash equipment was added in the magazines.

=== Modifications ===
Between 1919 and 1927, Queen Elizabeth underwent numerous modifications, including the enlargement of the foremast top. Rangefinders were installed on the gun turrets "B" and "X" as well as high angle rangefinders at the forward wheelhouse. Another high angle range finder was installed at the forward conning tower. The 3-inch guns were replaced by 4-inch guns. Radio direction finding equipment was installed at the aft end of the command platform with antenna above the helm station, the bridge superstructure was modified and funnels were combined into one unit. Furthermore, the superstructures for accommodating signal personnel and equipment were extended and the yards on the foremast were removed. In her 1937–1941 rebuild she was fitted with a tower bridge in place of her old bridge; her 6-inch (152 mm) guns were removed and replaced by 20 (10 × 2) 4.5 in (114 mm) guns in ten double turrets and several smaller anti-aircraft guns; horizontal armour was added; engines and boilers were replaced; and the elevation of her main battery was increased to 30 degrees. Deck armour was increased to 5 inches over the magazines, 2.5 inches over the machinery, while the new 4.5-inch guns had between 1 and 2 inches of armour. She also received facilities for aircraft with a launching catapult amidships New fire control equipment was installed, including the HACS Mk IV AA fire control system and the Admiralty Fire Control Table Mk VII for surface fire control of the main armament. This reconstruction was completed in January 1941, when Britain had been at war for over a year. The ship was fitted with flying-off platforms mounted on the roofs of 'B' and 'X' turrets by February 1919, from which fighters and reconnaissance aircraft could launch. The platform was removed from 'X' turret during her 1926–1927 refit; the other platform was removed sometime later.

== Construction and career ==
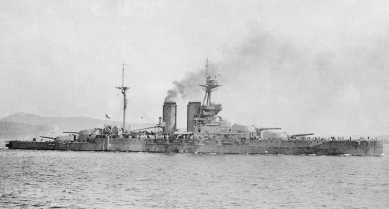
Queen Elizabeth in her original configuration at Lemnos, 1915

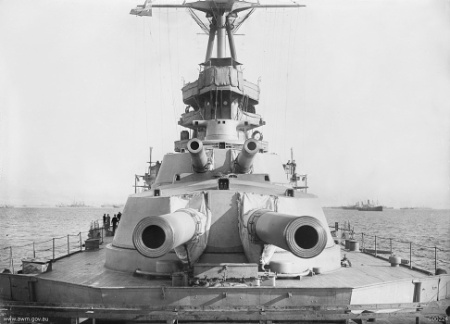
View of forward guns and bridge at Gallipoli, 1915

Queen Elizabeth, named after Elizabeth I of England, was laid down at Portsmouth Dockyard on 21 October 1912 and was launched on 16 October 1913, completing in January 1915 during the First World War. While still undergoing testing in the Mediterranean, the ship was sent to the Dardanelles for the Allied attempt to knock the Ottoman Empire out of the war. During the attempted military invasion of the Gallipoli on 25 April, Queen Elizabeth was the flagship for General Sir Ian Hamilton, commander of the Mediterranean Expeditionary Force.

=== Dardanelles ===
After the ships of the British and French fleets had shelled the outer forts of the Gallipoli peninsula on 3 November 1914, it was decided to launch a complete amphibious operation in January 1915. Therefore, the Admiralty ordered a convoy of eight ships – including Queen Elizabeth – to the Dardanelles. She was scheduled to reach the Dardanelles on 15 February. But due to an accident off Gibraltar on 12 February, in which she had torn off the blades of one of her turbines and was thus no longer able to travel at more than half speed, her arrival was postponed to 25 February. Upon their arrival on 25 February, Queen Elizabeth, together with Agamemnon, Irresistible and Gaulois, launched a new attack with the aim of destroying the outer forts at close range and all the way to the entrance. Since the attack on 19 February had shown how little hope there was of permanently disabling a battery by the mere firing of shells, the order for the attacking ships was to destroy every single gun by a direct hit. The general plan was for four ships to sail in groups of two to the entrance of the strait, turn around and then attack Cape Helles and Kum Kale with their secondary armament until they reached a distance of about 3,300 yards. In pursuance of these orders, Queen Elizabeth anchored 7 miles southwest of the Cape Helles lighthouse, set her sights on Sedd el Bahr and took out the two modern 23 cm guns there. During the first week of March, several bombardments of the inner forts proved fruitless. On 5 March, Queen Elizabeth fired for four hours from a distance of 13 kilometers at the forts on the European side of the strait, but with almost no effect. The next day she fired on Chemenlik, but the Ottomans had moved unnoticed the old pre-dreadnought Hairredin Barbarossa into the strait at Chanak, from where it could fire on Queen Elizabeth. The first shells were ignored thinking they were coming from a mobile field howitzer, but to be safe they moved 1 km away from this position. When the Ottoman ship's observation post on the coast was discovered, Queen Elizabeth, Agamemmnon and Ocean fired at it with several salvos, but the Ottomans quickly moved to a new position, so Hairredin Barbarossa fired again at Queen Elizabeth, finally hitting her three times below the waterline. However, the shells could not penetrate the battleship's belt armour. In order to avoid further damage, the ship withdrew from this position.

==== Main attack on 18 March ====
The event that decided the battle took place on the night of 18 March, when the Ottoman minelayer Nusret laid a series of mines across the head of Eren Köy Bay, a wide bay along the Asiatic coast right at the entrance to the strait, in front of the Kephez minefield. The Ottomans had noticed that the British ships were turning to starboard as they retreated into the bay. The new line of 20 mines ran parallel to the shore, anchored at a height of fifteen metres and spaced about 91 metres apart. Because of the clear water, the mines could be seen through the water by reconnaissance aircraft. The British plan for 18 March was to take out the defences of the first five minefields, which were to be cleared overnight. The next day, the remaining defences around the Narrows were to be overcome and the last five minefields removed. The operation continued without the British and French knowing of the recent additions to the Ottoman minefields. The battleships were deployed in three lines, two British and one French, with support ships on the flanks and two ships in reserve. After Queen Elizabeth had slowly entered the strait under constant fire, she reached her attack position at around 11:00 and opened fire on the fortifications at Çanakkale at 11:25. At first, the attack seemed to go according to plan, but after several ships hit the mines laid earlier in the afternoon, it was decided to withdraw as darkness fell. Queen Elizabeth took part in further naval operations with heavy losses until the beginning of May. But after several battleships were sunk in May, the Admiralty decided to cease constant battleship support. Thus, on 12 May, Queen Elizabeth left the Dardanelles and returned home. She then proceeded to Gibraltar and on to Scapa Flow, where she joined the 5th Battle Squadron on 26 May 1916. From 22 May to 4 June 1916, she was overhauled at Rosyth, so she did not take part in the Battle of Jutland. Also in June, she temporarily became the flagship of the 5th Battle Squadron. In July, the ship underwent another overhaul. After her recommissioning in 1917, she briefly served as U.S. Admiral Mayo's flagship.

=== Interwar period ===
On 15 November 1918, representatives of the German Empire signed the terms of the armistice with the Allies on board the Queen Elizabeth. On 26 July 1924 she took part in the annual fleet review off Spithead and on 1 November 1924 was detached to the Mediterranean Fleet to replace the Iron Duke as flagship. She was then replaced as flagship by Warspite in May 1926 and decommissioned in Portsmouth for refit. After the refit, which lasted until December 1927, she was recommissioned as flagship of the Mediterranean Fleet on 2 January 1928 and visited Istanbul in October 1929. From November 1929 to May 1930 she underwent another overhaul at Portsmouth. In July of the same year, she was detached to Alexandria with Ramillies to support local troops during the uprising by the Waft Party. From November 1932 to March 1933, the ship was overhauled in Portsmouth and took part in the fleet review off Spithead on 16 July 1935 during the 25th anniversary of George V's throne jubilee. She was also in Alexandria during the Abyssinia Crisis and took part in the fleet review marking the coronation of George VI off Spithead on 19 May 1937. During the 1930s she participated in the non-intervention blockade during the Spanish Civil War.

=== Second World War ===
On 1 August 1937, she was decommissioned for conversion work at Portsmouth, but had to be transferred from Portsmouth to Rosyth in December 1940, fearing air raids by the Luftwaffe. On 31 January 1941, Queen Elizabeth was recommissioned and assigned to the 2nd Battle Squadron of the Home Fleet.

==== Mediterranean Sea ====
In May 1941, she was reassigned to the Mediterranean Fleet. On 6 May she departed Gibraltar for Alexandria and, together with Force H, formed convoy escorts to Malta. She then participated in the defence of Crete and the evacuation of British-Australian-New Zealand Expeditionary Force during the German Operation Merkur. On 26 May, she and Barham supported the air attack on the German base at Karpathos by aircraft from Formidable. On 27 May, she became the flagship of the 1st Battle Squadron and flagship of the 2nd Fleet, replacing Barham which had been damaged by bombs during the battle.

On 19 December 1941, Queen Elizabeth and her sister ship Valiant were seriously damaged by limpet mines placed by Italian combat swimmers of Decima Flottiglia MAS, who entered the Allied military port of Alexandria with SLC type "manned torpedoes" ("maiali"). Although badly damaged, with her draught increased to 41.8 feet (12.5m), Queen Elizabeth was not grounded on the harbour bottom, (Note: Prior to the attack Queen Elizabeth had a draught of 33ft 5in forward and 32ft 7in aft; after the explosion: draught 41ft 10in forward, 33ft 10in aft." Queen Elizabeth was moored in approximately 48ft (8 fathoms) of water.) her decks were clear and the Italian crews were captured. For this reason, the Royal Navy maintained the illusion of full operational status, to conceal their weakened position in the Mediterranean during the period the two ships were repaired and refloated. Valiant went back into service after many months and Queen Elizabeth after more than a year and a half. Following completion of temporary repairs in an Alexandria drydock in June 1942, she steamed through the Suez Canal and around Africa to the Navy Yard in Norfolk, Virginia, in the United States. From September 1942 until June 1943, she was comprehensively repaired. Queen Elizabeth went to the Home Fleet in July 1943.

==== Pacific ====
On 23 December 1943, Queen Elizabeth set sail bound for Trincomalee. Upon her arrival on 28 January 1944, C-in-C the Eastern Fleet Admiral Somerville assumed command. During Operation Cockpit, in formation with French and Dutch units, she supported Illustrious and the Saratoga in their attack on Sabang on 19 April. From 30 April to 1 May, she participated in the bombardment of Car Nicobar and Port Blair in the Andaman Islands during Operation D, after which the ship was overhauled at Durban from October to November 1944. In January 1945, she participated in further bombardments of Sabang during Operation Outflank and participated in the recapture of Burma until May where she supported the landing of Allied troops on Ramree Island on 21 January and on Cheduba Island on 26 January as part of Operation Dracula.

==== Post War ====
On 12 July 1945 she was replaced by HMS Nelson as flagship and returned home. After arriving in Portsmouth on 7 August 1945, she was detached to Rosyth for reserve duty on 10 August. From October 1945 to March 1946 she served the Home Fleet as accommodation ship. She was then reassigned to the Portsmouth Reserve where she remained until her decommissioning on 15 May 1948. In July 1948, she was sold to Arnott Young and scrapped at Troon.
