= Bianchi (surname) =

- Pronunciation: [ˈbjaŋki]

Origin
- Meaning: "white-haired" or "pale"
- Region of origin: Italy

Bianchi, a plural of bianco ("white" in Italian), is an Italian surname. Notable people with the surname include:

- Achille Bianchi (1837–?), Italian sculptor
- Al Bianchi (1932–2019), American professional basketball player, coach, and general manager
- Andrea Bianchi (1925–2013), Italian film director
- Anthony Bianchi (born 1958), Japanese politician
- Beto Bianchi (born 1966), Brazilian footballer
- Bianca Bianchi (1855–1947), stage name of Bertha Schwarz, German/Austrian opera soprano
- Bruno Bianchi (disambiguation), several people
- Carlos Bianchi (born 1949), former Argentine football (soccer) player and coach
- Craig Bianchi (born 1978), South African soccer player
- Daniela Bianchi (born 1942), actress
- Edoardo Bianchi (1865–1946), founder of Bianchi Bicycles in 1885
- Eliodoro Bianchi (1773–1848), Italian operatic tenor
- Emanuele Bianchi (born 1984), Italian footballer
- Emilio Bianchi (born 1957), Italian radio and TV journalist
- Eugenio Bianchi (born 1979), Italian physicist
- Federico Bianchi (born 1635), Italian painter
- Flavio Bianchi (born 2000), Italian footballer
- Francesco Bianchi (disambiguation), multiple people
- Frederick Bianchi, Duke of Casalanza (1768–1855), Austrian general
- Frederick Bianchi (born 1954), American-born composer
- Gerardo Bianchi (c. 1223–1302), Italian churchman
- Giuseppe Bianchi (disambiguation), several people
- Graciela Bianchi (born 1953), Uruguayan politician
- Gustavo Bianchi (1845–1884), Italian explorer of Ethiopia
- Ivana María Bianchi, Argentine politician
- Jeff Bianchi (born 1986), American baseball player
- Joe Bianchi (1871–1949), Italian-American artisan
- Jules Bianchi (1989–2015), French Formula One driver, great-nephew of Lucien Bianchi
- Kenneth Bianchi (born 1951), American serial killer
- Leonardo Bianchi (1848–1927), Italian neuropathologist
- Leonardo Bianchi (footballer) (born 1992), Italian footballer
- Lorenzo Bianchi (1899–1983), Italian Catholic priest, worked in Hong Kong
- Lucien Bianchi (1934–1969), Italian-born Belgian racing driver, great-uncle of Jules Bianchi
- Luigi Bianchi (1856–1928), Italian mathematician
- Luigi Alberto Bianchi (1945–2018), Italian violinist and violist
- Marius Bianchi (1823–1904), French politician
- Marta Bianchi (born 1943), Argentine actress
- Matthew Bianchi, Canadian film and television production designer, art director and set decorator
- Maurizio Bianchi (born 1955), Italian musician
- Michael A. Bianchi, columnist for the Orlando Sentinel
- Michele Bianchi (1883–1930), founding member of the Italian Fascism movement
- Myriam Alejandra Bianchi (1961–1996), known by her stage name Gilda, Argentine singer and songwriter
- Olga Bianchi (1924–2015), Latin American pacifist and human rights activist
- Orazio Filippo Bianchi (c. 1680–1757), Italian lawyer and classical scholar
- Ottavio Bianchi (born 1943), former coach for a number of Serie A teams
- Patrice Bianchi (born 1969), French alpine skier
- Patrizio Bianchi (born 1952), Italian economist and politician
- Regina Bianchi (1921–2013), Italian actress
- Rico Bianchi (1930–2025), Swiss rower
- Rolando Bianchi (born 1983), Italian footballer
- Rosa María Bianchi (born 1948), Argentine-born Mexican actress
- Susan Bianchi-Sand (born 1947), American former labor unionist
- Suzanne M. Bianchi (1952–2013), American sociologist
- Thomas S. Bianchi (born 1956), American oceanographer
- Tom Bianchi (born 1945), American photographer
- Valentin Lvovich Bianchi (1857–1920), Russian ornithologist
- Vitaly Bianki (1894–1959), Russian children's writer, son of Valentin Lvovich Bianchi

== Fictional characters ==
- Dora Bianchi and Sven Bianchi, characters in the webcomic Questionable Content

== See also ==
- Bianchi (disambiguation)
