= KVFD =

KVFD could refer to:

- KVFD (AM), a radio station (1400 AM) licensed to Fort Dodge, Iowa, United States
- KVFD-TV, a defunct television station (analog 21 and 50) in Fort Dodge, Iowa, United States
