= NBC 21 =

NBC 21 may refer to one of the following television stations in the United States:

- KNBN in Rapid City, South Dakota
- KNPG-LD in St. Joseph, Missouri
- KQTV/KVFD-TV in Fort Dodge, Iowa (formerly with NBC from 1953 to 1977; now defunct)
- KTVZ in Bend, Oregon
- WFMJ-TV in Youngstown, Ohio
- WPTA-DT2, a digital channel of WPTA in Fort Wayne, Indiana
