= KUEL =

KUEL may refer to:

- KUEL-LP, a defunct low-power radio station (97.1 FM) formerly licensed to serve Kensett, Iowa, United States
- KUFX, a radio station (92.1 FM) licensed to serve Fort Dodge, Iowa, which held the call sign KUEL from 1990 to 2009
