= Giuseppe Bianchi =

Giuseppe Bianchi may refer to:

- Giuseppe Bianchi (abbot), 17th-century abbot
- Giuseppe Bianchi (architect), 18th-century Italian architect
- Giuseppe Bianchi (astronomer) (1791–1866), Italian astronomer
- Giuseppe Bianchi (engineer) (1888–1969), Italian railway engineer
- Giuseppe Bianchi (musician), Italian musician
