= KIFR =

KIFR may refer to:

- KIFR (TV), a television station (virtual channel 49) licensed to serve Visalia, California, United States
- KLFG, a radio station (89.5 FM) licensed to serve Fort Dodge, Iowa, United States, which held the call sign KIFR from 2013 to 2015
- KAWV, a radio station (88.3 FM) licensed to serve Alice, Texas, United States, which held the call sign KIFR from 2007 to 2013
- KFRC-FM, a radio station (106.9 FM) licensed to serve San Francisco, California, United States, which held the call sign KIFR from 2005 to 2007
