= KIAQ =

Radio station in Clarion, Iowa

- Clarion, Iowa; United States
- Broadcast area: Fort Dodge, Iowa
- Frequency: 96.9 MHz
- Branding: K97

Programming
- Format: Country
- Affiliations: ABC News Radio; Westwood One

Ownership
- Owner: Connoisseur Media; (Alpha 3E Licensee LLC)
- Sister stations: KKEZ; KTLB; KVFD; KWMT; KXFT; KZLB

History
- First air date: 1965
- Former call signs: KRIT (1965–1992)

Technical information
- Licensing authority: FCC
- Facility ID: 54641
- Class: C1
- ERP: 100,000 watts
- HAAT: 176 m (577 ft)
- Transmitter coordinates: 42°40′17.8″N 94°9′11.8″W

Links
- Public license information: Public file; LMS
- Webcast: Listen live
- Website: www.yourfortdodge.com

KIAQ (96.9 FM) is a commercial radio station that serves the Fort Dodge, Iowa, area. The station broadcasts a country music format. KIAQ is owned by Connoisseur Media, through licensee Alpha 3E License, LLC.

== History ==
The station was originally licensed as KRIT on February 1, 1965, but changed callsigns to KIAQ on September 1, 1992.

In addition to its modern country music format, the station also provides local, regional and national news coverage, weather, sports and daily agriculture reports. KIAQ also broadcasts the University of Iowa football and basketball games.

The transmitter and broadcast tower are located four miles north of Badger, Iowa, along Hwy P52. According to the Antenna Structure Registration database, the tower is 183 m (600 ft) tall with the FM broadcast antenna mounted at the 179 m (587 ft) level. The calculated Height Above Average Terrain is 176 m (577 ft). The tower is also used by KLFG, which has its antenna array mounted at the 113 m (371 ft) level.
