= Mario Masciulli =

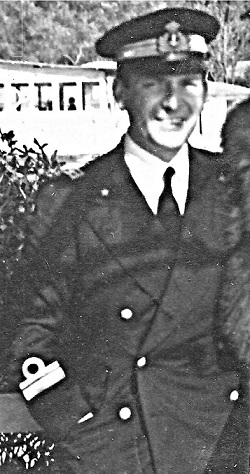
- Born: 15 September 1909; Livorno, Kingdom of Italy
- Died: 16 October 1991. aged 82; Caracas, Venezuela
- Military career
- Allegiance: Kingdom of Italy
- Branch: Regia Marina (Italian Royal Navy)
- Service years: 1932–1945
- Rank: Major
- Unit: Decima Flottiglia MAS
- Conflicts: World War II: Raid on Alexandria (1941)
- Awards: Silver Medal of Military Valor

Mario Elbano Masciulli Manelli, Baron Miglianico (15 September 1909 – 16 October 1991), was a prominent military engineer of the Italian Regia Marina, Major of Genio Navale and belonging to the recognized Decima Flottiglia MAS as director of the Office of Submarine Secret Weapons during Second World War. He was awarded the Silver Medal of Military Valor.

== First years, military career ==
Masciulli was born on 15 September 1909 in Livorno. He joined the Livorno Naval Academy in 1925, being number one in the entrance exam, among a large group of students. Later he was sent to the Polytechnic of Turin, where he earned an honours degree in Industrial Engineering, before obtaining a PhD in Mechanical Engineering.

== World War II ==
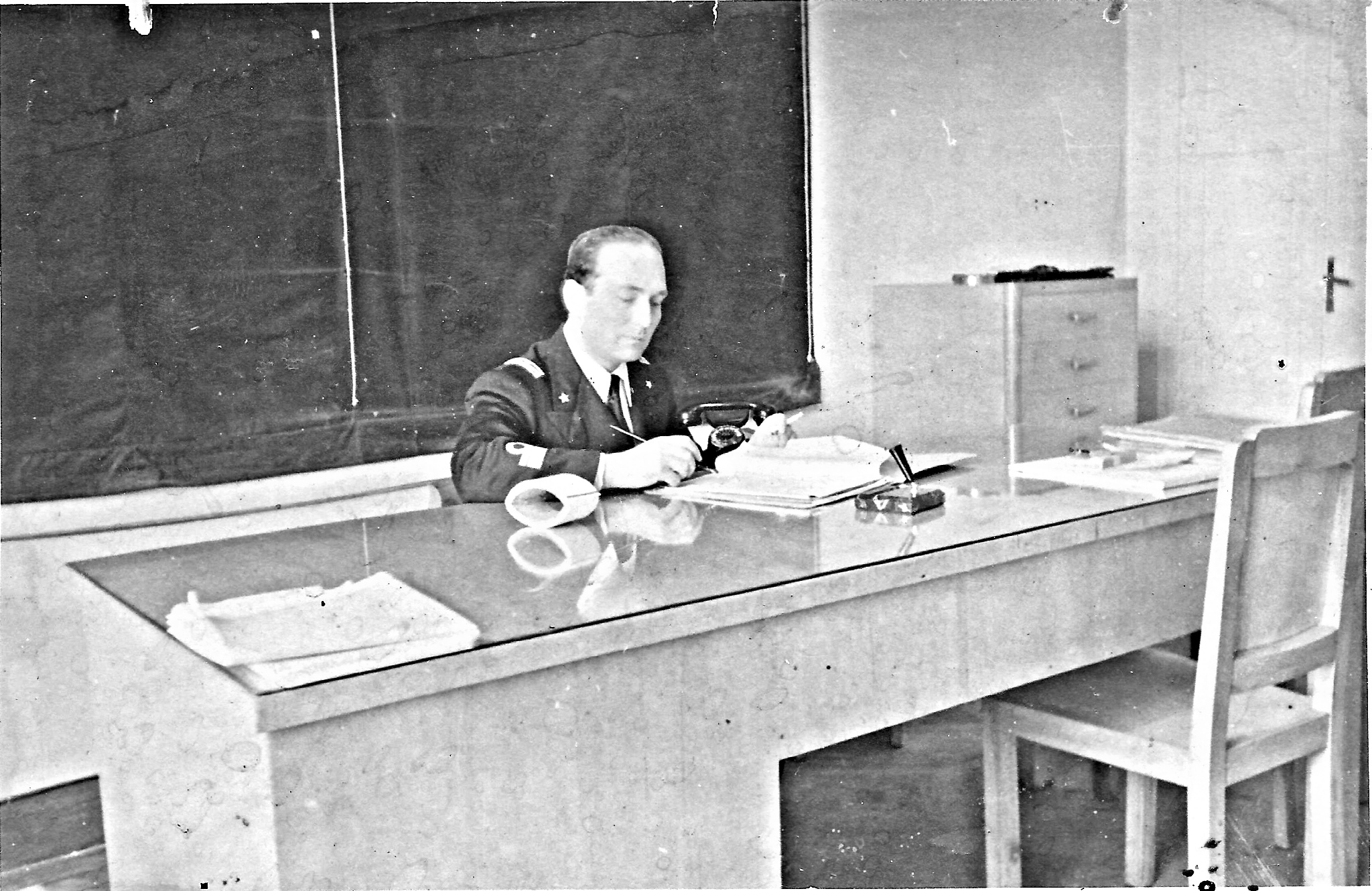
1941, Office of Submarine Secret Weapons

At the start of the war in 1939, he was conducting technical studies aboard various naval vessels such as the Battleship Andrea Doria and the Submarine Scirè where he familiarized with Prince Junio Valerio Borghese, by then commander of the submarine, who already knew of his years at the academy.

In 1940, Borghese requested him to form part of the newly restructured Decima Flottiglia MAS. Along with captain Travaglini, step hold Office of Submarine Secret Weapons, where, after several losses and failed attacks on the British base in Malta, he made improvements to the first human torpedoes, originally designed by Teseo Tesei and known as Siluro a lenta Corsa (SLC) and nicknamed "Maiale" (Pig, in English), eliminating the cause of many problems. Using the experience gained and scientific, industrial, and technological progress, he began the construction of a similar design, but with significantly higher characteristics. Launched from the submarine Scire, two men manoeuvred it from a cockpit. Once near the boat, they placed the explosives with a timer. As director of the Office of Submarine Secret Weapons, he also designed and updated the Motoscafo Armato Silurante (MAS), motorboats of between 20 and 30 tons displacement, with a crew of 10 men armed with two torpedoes, plus several machine guns and occasionally a small-calibre cannon.

The biggest success of the Maiale occurred on 19 December 1941, when Lieutenant Luigi Durand de la Penne and Emilio Bianchi used two maiale to defend the port of Alexandria, Egypt, and severely damaged two British battleships (HMS Valiant and HMS Queen Elizabeth) Other weapons were designed and built by the Office of Submarine Secret Weapons: these included acoustic mines and incendiary bombs which were designed so that the pilots of the torpedoes could introduce them into enemy ports.

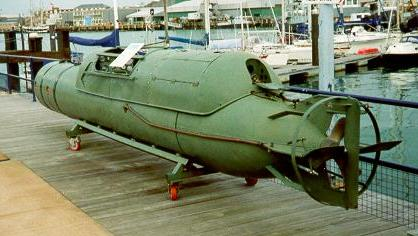
Italian manned torpedo "Siluro San Bartolomeo" displayed at the Royal Navy Submarine Museum, Gosport, UK..

== Siluro San Bartolomeo ==
When using the Maiale human torpedo, Masciulli noticed some limitations, demonstrating the need for an updated version. The improvement in the materials available for the assembly and parallel new technologies led to a far superior product to the point of not being able to identify and as an outgrowth of the human torpedo ("Siluro a Lenta Corsa)" SLC Maiale. So the Siluro San Bartolomeo had born. The project was managed and developed by the engineer of the Genio Navale, Major Mario Masciulli, with the help of Captain G. N. Travaglino, with help from engineer Guido Cattaneo. Also helping with the direction of Submarine Weapons Arsenal, La Spezia.

== Armistice, 8 September 1943 ==
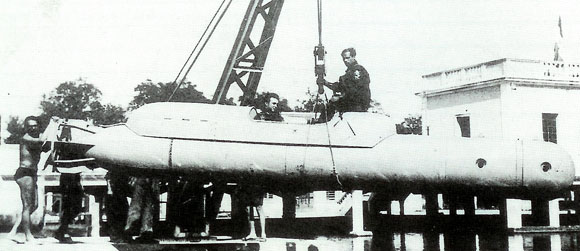
1943, Siluro San Bartolomeo test

The new Badoglio government of Italy signed an armistice with the Allies. Further attacks on Gibraltar using the new and larger replacement for the SLC (the Siluro San Bartolomeo type), and a planned raid on New York City were called off due to the Italian surrender. Just three Siluro San Bartolomeo had been manufactured for the date of the Armistice between Italy and Allied armed forces, two remained in La Spezia and one was sent to Venice, which was found at the end of the war. Both of La Spezia were consigned to the La Castagna Task Force, an old battery of the Decima Flottiglia MAS under the command of Lieutenant Augusto Jacobacci (Siluro San Bartolomeo pilot). Those had been designated to attack Gibraltar, but the action was suspended with the Armistice signed on 3 September 1943 but made public on 8 September, between the Kingdom of Italy and the Allies armed forces.

== After war ==
The engineer Mario Masciulli was injured in a leg and both hands, in a technical accident in 1943, while he was doing a personal test aboard a Maiale. After the war, he was promoted to the rank of colonel, and always maintained close contact with Borghese. Later plays for several years as director of the important company Pirelli, based in Milan, Italy. The company had already demonstrated their competence and high capacity when the engineer, as head of the Office of Submarine Secret Weapons, asked them for material for the preparation of the costumes used by the Frogmen. In 1957 known in Milan, the Vice Admiral Carlos Larrazabal, Venezuelan Military attache in Italy and brother of the next President Wolfgang Larrazabal. He then asked for his vast knowledge, to teach at the Italian Naval Academy and decided to move and settle in Caracas.

For the rest of his life, he worked as an entrepreneur in Venezuela along with several Italians who had also belonged to the Regia Marina.

He died in Caracas, of natural causes on 16 October 1991.

For the 1953 Italian war film Siluri umani (internationally released as Human Torpedoes) directed by Antonio Leonviola. narrated the adventures of these secret weapons. One of its military advisors was Masciulli and the former admiral Marcantonio Bragadin. Leonviola came into conflict with the film's producers just before its completion and was replaced by Carlo Lizzani.
