= Woodman Hollow State Preserve =

Iowa state preserve

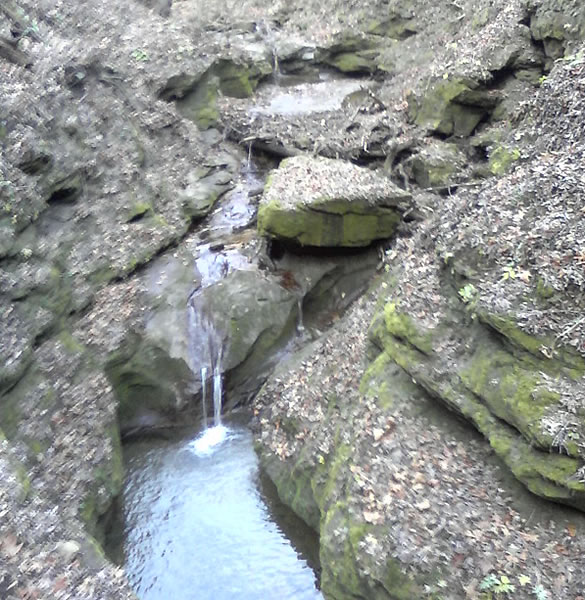
- Small waterfall and gorge in Woodman Hollow State Preserve

- Location within Iowa Location within the United States
- Location: Webster County, Iowa, United States
- Coordinates: 42°25′20″N 94°6′0″W
- Area: 63.5 acres (25.7 ha)
- Elevation: 1,110 ft (340 m)
- Governing body: Iowa Department of Natural Resources

Woodman Hollow State Preserve is located in Webster County, Iowa, United States, 7 miles (11 km) southeast of Fort Dodge and 6 miles (9.7 km) northwest of Lehigh. The preserve is a satellite area of Dolliver Memorial State Park, located 2 miles (3.2 km) to the south. Some older maps refer to the area as "Woodman's Hollow State Park."

== History ==
=== Geological Formation and Early Human Use ===
Many of the rock bluffs lining the interior of the preserve are composed of sandstones, limestones, and dolomites. The rock was produced over time from chemical and physical processes acting on the bed of ancient marine seaways that once covered vast portions of North America between 66 and 550 million years ago. The shoreline of the ancient seaways migrated back and forth from roughly Oklahoma to Illinois, and the river delta systems deposited clay, mud, peat, and channel sands across the area. Over time, these deposits were compacted and cemented into the familiar rock formations observed today. Significant erosion of glacial deposits by the Des Moines River and associated tributaries has helped to expose these deposits over time after the retreat of the Wisconsin Glaciation about 12,000 to 14,000 years before present. Two man-made rock shelters found within the preserve provided evidence to suggest that Woodland Indians or Archaic Indians inhabited the area as early as 2,800 years ago.

=== Designation as a State Public Area ===
The Iowa Board of Conservation purchased the land that would become Woodman Hollow in 1927 from A. S. Woodman. The original intent of the area was for it to be developed as a state park, and in the 1930s the Civilian Conservation Corps constructed an access road, two latrines, some trails, and the foundations for a trail bridge. The State of Iowa later decided to discontinue development of the area and to leave it in its natural condition. The land was officially designated as a biological, geological, and archaeological state preserve on August 12, 1970.

== Description ==
The preserve features several deep, forested ravines, which combine into a larger ravine with a small creek that empties into the Des Moines River. The creek is spring and runoff fed. Sandstone bedrock lines the ravine walls. Several small cascades and waterfalls up to 12 feet (3.7 m) high have carved a shallow gorge through the center of the preserve. The access road was removed, and most trails within the park have eroded away or have become overgrown.

== Flora ==
Over 500 species of plants can be found within Woodman Hollow. The preserve is said to have one of the largest varieties of ferns in the state of Iowa. Trees found in the area include white and red oak in the uplands. Numerous old growth trees, some over 300 years in age, exist within the boundaries of the preserve, some old enough to be used in climate reconstruction through Dendrochronology. Near the river, steep ravine walls on both sides of the creek exceed 100 feet (30 m) in height - steep enough to vary the species of flora over short distances.

== Access ==
The entrance to the preserve is on Woodman's Hollow Road, 3 miles (4.8 km) east of Otho. A small, grassy parking area provides a space for two vehicles. The entrance to the main area of the preserve is a narrow, overgrown corridor between two farm fields that heads south for roughly 1,000 feet (300 m), which is the old access road grade. The largest of the waterfalls and the beginning of the shallow gorge are directly south of the entrance corridor.

No hunting or camping is allowed within the boundaries of the preserve.
