= Oak Hill Historic District (Fort Dodge, Iowa) =

Historic district in Iowa, United States

- U.S. National Register of Historic Places
- U.S. Historic district
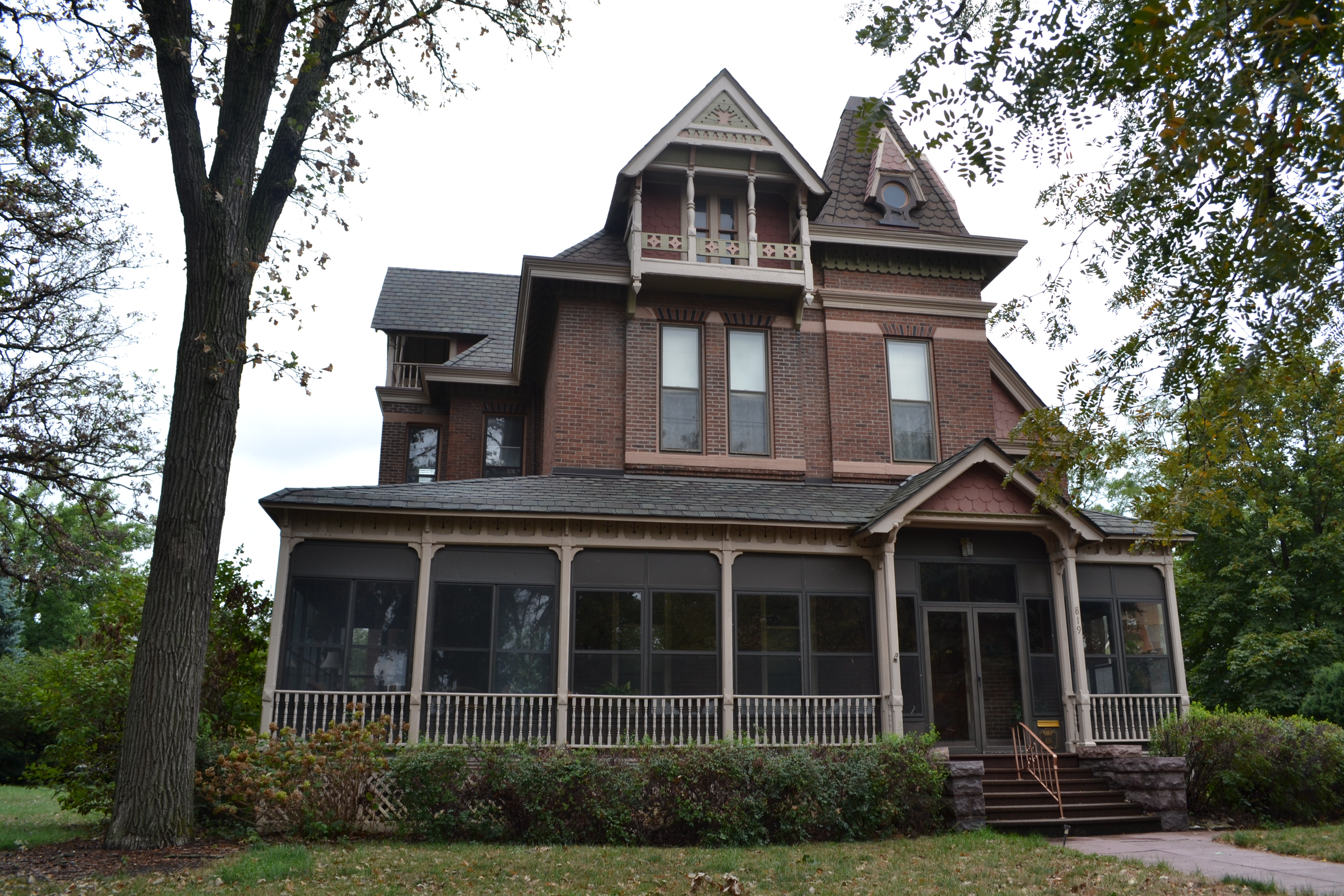
- E.H. Rich House (1880)

- Location within Iowa Location within the United States
- Location: 8th-12th Sts. and 2nd and 3rd Aves., Fort Dodge, Iowa
- Coordinates: 42°30′10″N 94°11′05″W
- Area: 8.75 acres (3.54 ha)
- Architectural style: Late Victorian; Late 19th and 20th Century Revivals
- NRHP reference No.: 77000567
- Added to NRHP: May 5, 1977

The Oak Hill Historic District, also known as East Fort Dodge, is a nationally recognized historic district located in Fort Dodge, Iowa, United States. It was listed on the National Register of Historic Places in 1977. At the time of its nomination the district consisted of 22 resources, including 17 contributing buildings, and five noncontributing buildings. The contributing buildings are all houses, including the Vincent House (1871), except for two buildings. The exceptions are the Bennett Carriage House (1890) and the Blanden Art Gallery (1930). The houses were built in various styles from 1866 to 1916. Three apartment buildings, a funeral home, and Grace Lutheran Church (1955) are the non-contributing buildings.
