= Siluro San Bartolomeo =

Italian manned torpedo design of late WWII

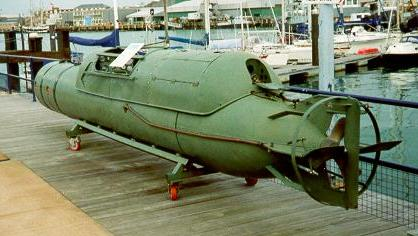
- Siluro San Bartolomeo

History
- Name: Siluro San Bartolomeo
- Commissioned: 1943

General characteristics
- Type: Human torpedo
- Length: 6,77m
- Propulsion: 7.5 HP Motor
- Speed: 2.3–4 Knots
- Armament: Normal: explosives charge 300 kg Version 2: 400 kg Version 3: Double 180/200 kg charge

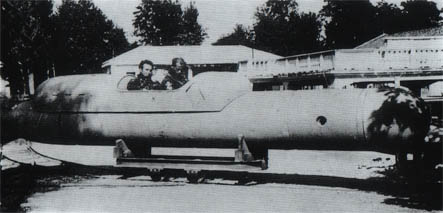
Testing Siluro San Bartolomeo

The Siluro San Bartolomeo (St. Bartholomew Torpedo) was an Italian human torpedo designed during World War II, used by the Decima Flottiglia MAS for commando style operations. Some limitations had been noticed when using the Siluro Lenta Corsa (also known as Maiale) human torpedo, demonstrating the need for an updated version. The project was managed and developed by the engineer of the Genio Naval, Mayor Mario Masciulli, with the help of Captain G.N Travaglino and engineer Guido Cattaneo. The improvement in the materials available for the assembly and parallel new technologies led to a far superior product to its precursor.

Just three Siluro San Bartolomeo had been manufactured before the date of the Armistice between Italy and Allied armed forces; two remained in La Spezia and one which was sent to Venice was found at the end of the war. Both of La Spezia were consigned to the La Castagna Task Force, an old battery of the Decima Flottiglia MAS under the command of Lieutenant Augusto Jacobacci (Siluro San Bartolomeo pilot). Those had been designated to attack Gibraltar, but the action was suspended with the armistice. Only three specimens were fielded before the armistice.
