= Siluro Lenta Corsa =

Human torpedo used as an underwater assault vehicle by Regia Marina

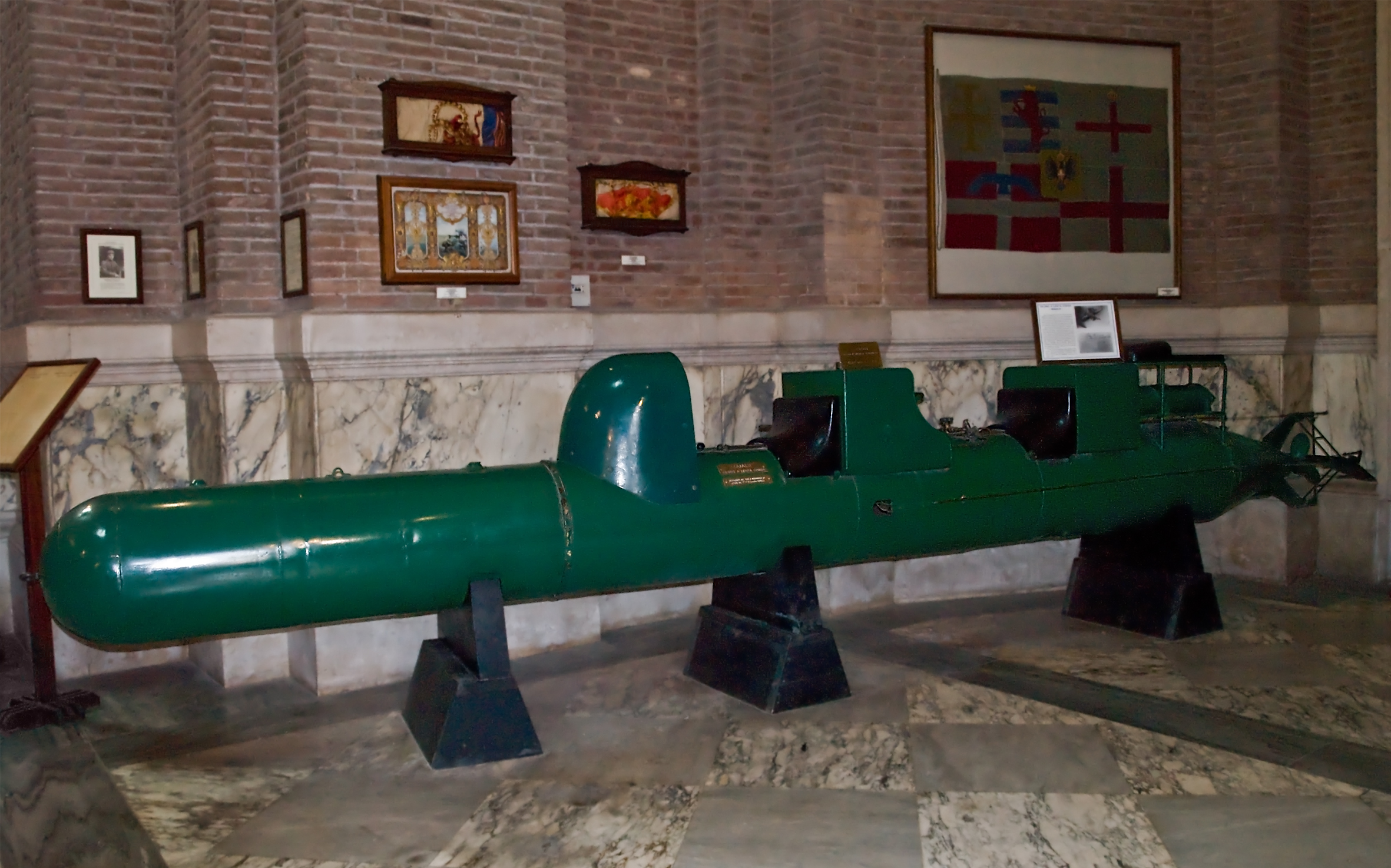
- A Siluro Lenta Corsa (SLC) or "Maiale", at the Sacrario delle bandiere delle Forze Armate in Rome, Italy.

Class overview
- Name: Siluro Lenta Corsa
- Builders: The San Bartolomeo workshops at La Spezia Naval Base
- Operators: Regia Marina
- Succeeded by: Siluro San Bartolomeo
- Built: 1935–1943
- Completed: around 50

General characteristics
- Displacement: 1.8t
- Length: 6.77m
- Beam: 530 mm
- Installed power: 1 Battery (60 volts 150 ampere)
- Propulsion: 1.1 hp to 1.6 hp electric Motor
- Speed: 3 knots (max) 2.3 knots (max range)
- Range: 15 nautical miles
- Armament: 260 kg explosive charge

The Siluro Lenta Corsa ("slow-running torpedo" in Italian), also known by its acronym SLC or as the "maiale" ("pig" in Italian), was a human torpedo used as an underwater assault vehicle by the Italian Regia Marina. Similar in shape to a torpedo, it was adapted to carry at low speed two operators, equipped with autonomous underwater breathing apparatus and a limpet mine to be applied covertly to the hull of an enemy ship at mooring.

It was used by the Decima Flottiglia MAS during World War II for sabotage actions against enemy ships, often anchored in heavily defended ports, such as during the 1941 Raid on Alexandria.

== History ==
The slow-running torpedo was derived from Raffaele Rossetti's Mignatta (Italian for "leech"), used in World War I to sink the Austrian battleship Viribus Unitis. The nickname "maiale" (Italian for "pig") was adopted as a code name by Tesei to protect the secrecy of the craft. The idea was born during training, when an exasperated sailor used the term to refer to the torpedo.

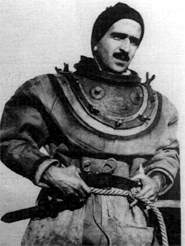
Teseo Tesei, one of the naval engineers who conceived the "maiale" and was awarded the Medaglia d'Oro

This project was conceived in 1935 by the Naval Engineer diver captains Teseo Tesei and Elios Toschi. Teseo Tesei later died in action with one of his pigs in Malta. The first two prototypes of the SLC were tested in October 1935, in the San Bartolomeo torpedo workshops of La Spezia in the presence of Mario Falangola who at the time directed the Submarine Inspectorate. Falangola was so enthusiastic about it that he commissioned the construction of two more SLCs. In 1939 the navy department that trained in the use of the SLC was transferred to a secret base located in Bocca di Serchio, in the stretch of sea in front of the mouth of the river Serchio. During repeated training tests, the weapon was perfected (see Mario Giorgini and Gino Birindelli) and between 1939 and ’43 the Italian navy manufactured more than 50 SLCs.

On December 19, 1941 the "maiali" carried out their most famous action, the raid on Alexandria, Egypt, in which they and sank the British battleships HMS Valiant and HMS Queen Elizabeth, the tanker Sagona and the destroyer Jervis. The three SLCs had been transported close to the enemy base by the submarine Sciré inside three cylinders placed on deck. SLCs operated secretly from the oil tanker Olterra, interned in the neutral port of Algeciras, 2 miles from the Port of Gibraltar. The Italians smuggled SLCs parts and reassembled them within the Olterra before launching them from a hidden underwater hatch. They sank or damaged nine Allied cargo vessels totaling 42,000 tons. Only after Italy capitulated in September 1943 did the Allies discover Olterra’s role. The British used captured specimens of the SLC to develop their own Chariot manned torpedo. SLCs sank or damaged a total of three warships and 111,527 tons of merchant shipping. Italy developed an improved version, the SSB (Siluro San Bartolomeo) but fielded only three of them before the armistice.

== Design ==
The first SLCs, developed shortly before the outbreak of the Second World War, were 7.30 metres (24.0 ft) long and equipped with a 1.2-kilowatt (1.6 hp) electric motor. Power was supplied by an accumulator battery (60 volts, 150 ampere). The maximum speed was 5.6 kilometres per hour (3 kn) with a range of approximately 28 kilometres (15 nmi) at a speed of 4.6 kilometres per hour (2.5 kn).

The carrier was equipped with depth and direction rudders, ballast tanks, and instrumentation that included a magnetic compass, a depth gauge, a clock, a voltmeter, two ammeters, and a bubble level for longitudinal trim control.

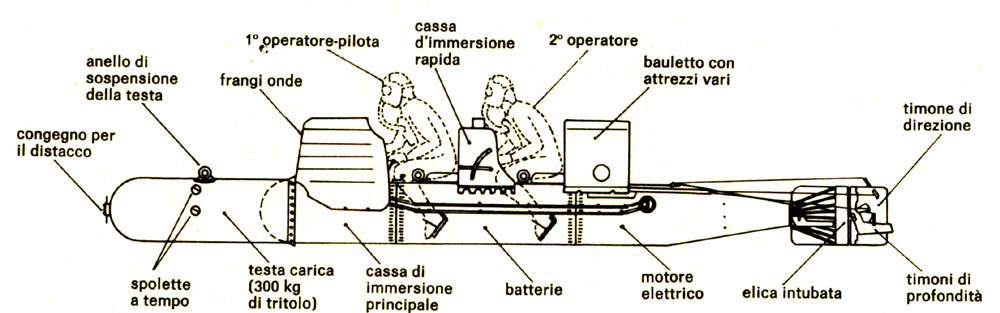
Schematic of a Siluro Lenta Corsa

The carrier was composed of three sections: in the first, rounded in shape to facilitate navigation, the charge (approximately 260 kg of TNT) along with the corresponding detonation devices was housed. This part, called the service head, was detached from the rest of the device and applied under the keel of the ship.

The central part, cylindrical in shape and called the central body, contained the batteries and externally the structures on which the positions for the two operators were located. In the third, truncated conical in shape and called the tail, the motor was housed along with the framework supporting the propellers and rudders.
