= KTLB =

Radio station in Twin Lakes, Iowa

Coordinates: 42.536°N 94.680°W

- Twin Lakes, Iowa; United States
- Broadcast area: Fort Dodge, Iowa
- Frequency: 105.9 MHz
- Branding: 105.9 The Beach

Programming
- Format: Oldies

Ownership
- Owner: Connoisseur Media; (Alpha 3E License, LLC)
- Sister stations: KKEZ; KIAQ; KVFD; KWMT; KXFT; KZLB

History
- First air date: 1975

Technical information
- Licensing authority: FCC
- Facility ID: 28657
- Class: C3
- ERP: 25,000 watts
- HAAT: 100 meters (330 ft)

Links
- Public license information: Public file; LMS
- Webcast: Listen live
- Website: www.yourfortdodge.com

KTLB (105.9 FM) is a radio station that broadcasts from Fort Dodge, Iowa (licensed to Twin Lakes, Iowa). The station broadcasts an oldies music format as "105.9 The Beach". The station is owned by Connoisseur Media, through licensee Alpha 3E License, LLC.

Previously, the station was known as 105.9 The Beach, broadcasting an oldies format. In December 2012, KTLB dropped the format and began stunting with Christmas music. On December 26, KTLB switched their stunt to various versions of Iron Butterfly's In-A-Gadda-Da-Vida; the following day, the stunt switched to a loop of David Bowie's "Changes". On January 1, 2013, KTLB launched a classic hits format branded as "Hippie Radio 105.9". The station later rebranded back to "105.9 The Beach".
