= Lizard Creek (Iowa) =

Stream in Iowa, U.S.

Coordinates: 42.5292°N 94.2567°W

Lizard Creek is a stream located near Des Moines, Fort Dodge, Iowa in the United States.

The streambed is almost all rock and sand with many large boulders. It is west of Fort Dodge, Iowa. Also the water is known to be unusually clear for midwestern streams.

== Tourism ==
Lizard Creek is a popular destination for canoeing and paddling, accessible via a system of water trail entry points.

== See also ==
- List of rivers of Iowa
