= KXFT =

Radio station in Manson, Iowa

Coordinates: 42.517°N 94.346°W

- Manson, Iowa; United States
- Broadcast area: Fort Dodge, Iowa
- Frequency: 99.7 MHz
- Branding: Sunny 99.7

Programming
- Format: Soft adult contemporary
- Affiliations: Fox News Radio

Ownership
- Owner: Connoisseur Media; (Alpha 3E Licensee LLC)
- Sister stations: KKEZ; KTLB; KIAQ; KVFD; KWMT; KZLB

History
- First air date: November 2007

Technical information
- Licensing authority: FCC
- Facility ID: 162477
- Class: C3
- ERP: 25,000 watts
- HAAT: 87 meters (285 ft)

Links
- Public license information: Public file; LMS
- Webcast: Listen live
- Website: www.yourfortdodge.com

KXFT (99.7 FM, "Sunny 99.7") is a radio station broadcasting a soft adult contemporary format. Licensed to Manson, Iowa, United States, the station serves Fort Dodge, Iowa. The station is owned by Connoisseur Media, through licensee Alpha 3E Licensee LLC.

== History ==
KXFT signed on in November 2007 with a Top 40 (CHR) format as "99X". On July 31, 2009, at 5 p.m., the station changed to an adult contemporary format as "Sunny 99.7" as the Top 40 (CHR) format was moved to sister station KKEZ "Mix 94.5", which was previously adult contemporary.
