= KKEZ =

Radio station in Fort Dodge, Iowa

Coordinates: 42.495°N 94.209°W

- Fort Dodge, Iowa; United States
- Broadcast area: North Central Iowa
- Frequency: 94.5 MHz
- Branding: Mix 94.5

Programming
- Format: Hot adult contemporary

Ownership
- Owner: Connoisseur Media; (Alpha 3E Licensee LLC)
- Sister stations: KIAQ; KTLB; KVFD; KWMT; KXFT; KZLB

History
- First air date: 1966
- Former call signs: KWMT-FM (1965–1974)

Technical information
- Facility ID: 35892
- Class: C1
- ERP: 100,000 watts
- HAAT: 183 meters (600 ft)

Links
- Webcast: Listen live
- Website: www.yourfortdodge.com

KKEZ (94.5 MHz, "Mix 94.5") is a commercial FM radio station in Fort Dodge, Iowa. It has a hot adult contemporary radio format and is owned by Connoisseur Media. The transmitter is off U.S. Route 169 at Avenue G in Fort Dodge.

== History ==
In 1966, the station signed on as KWMT-FM. It was the FM counterpart to KWMT (540 AM), simulcasting its country music and farm news programming. Around 1970, it switched to an automated beautiful music format, later taking the call sign KKEZ.

In 1979, KKEZ changed from beautiful music to contemporary hit radio (Top 40) as "Fort Dodge's Hit Radio 94, KKEZ". The station became branded as "Z94" by veteran Iowa programmer Jim Davis in 1986. In the early 1990s, the station flipped to classic rock. In January 2000, the station changed its format to adult contemporary as "Mix 94.5" until it went soft adult contemporary in January 2009.

In 2000, KWMT and KKEZ were acquired by Clear Channel Communications, a forerunner to iHeartMedia. In 2007, Clear Channel sold the station to Coloff Media, who would later sell to Alpha Media. On July 31, 2009, the station reverted to its adult contemporary format while keeping the "Mix 94.5" name. Alpha Media merged with Connoisseur Media on September 4, 2025.
