= Fort Dodge, Iowa =

- City
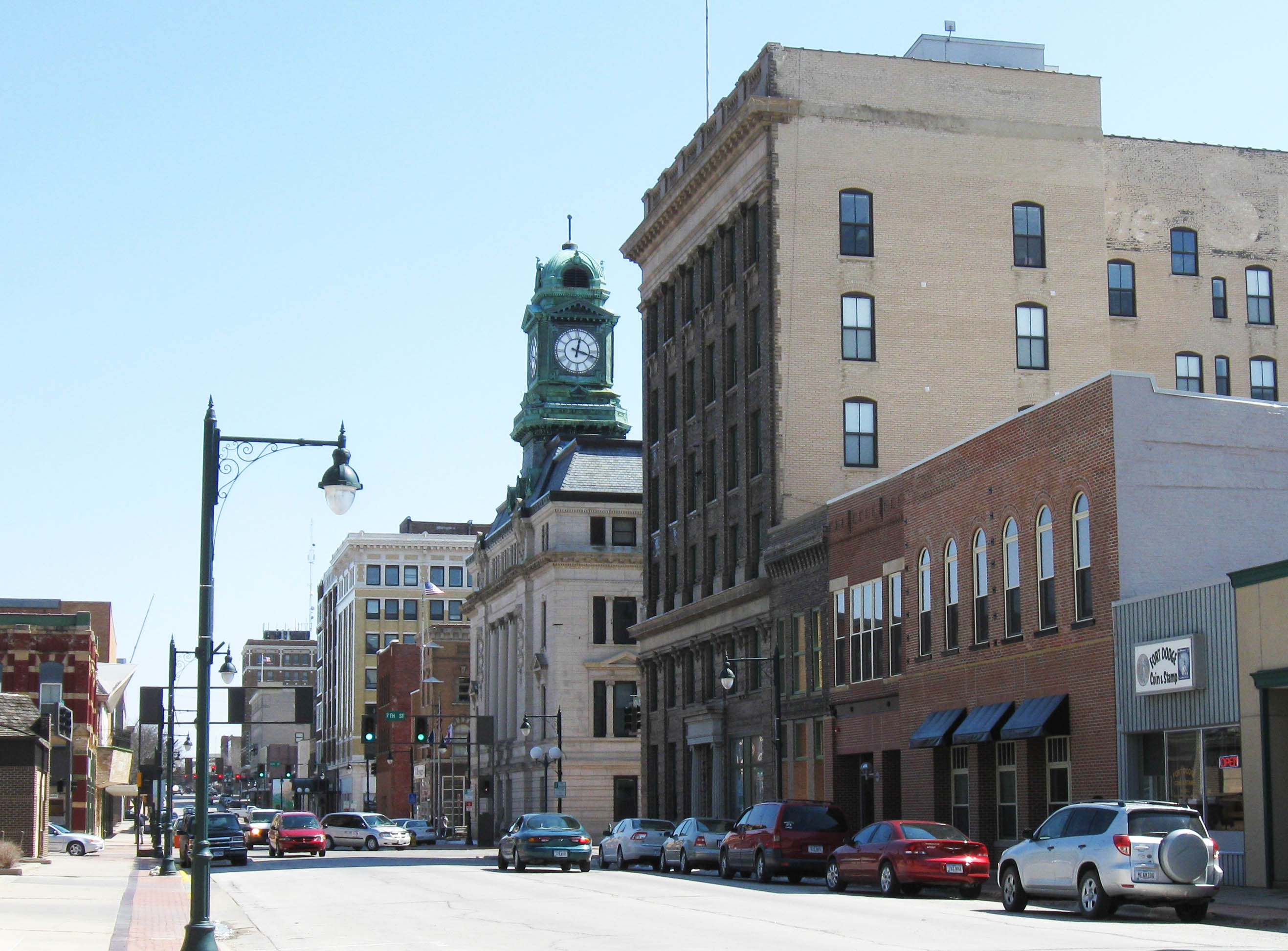
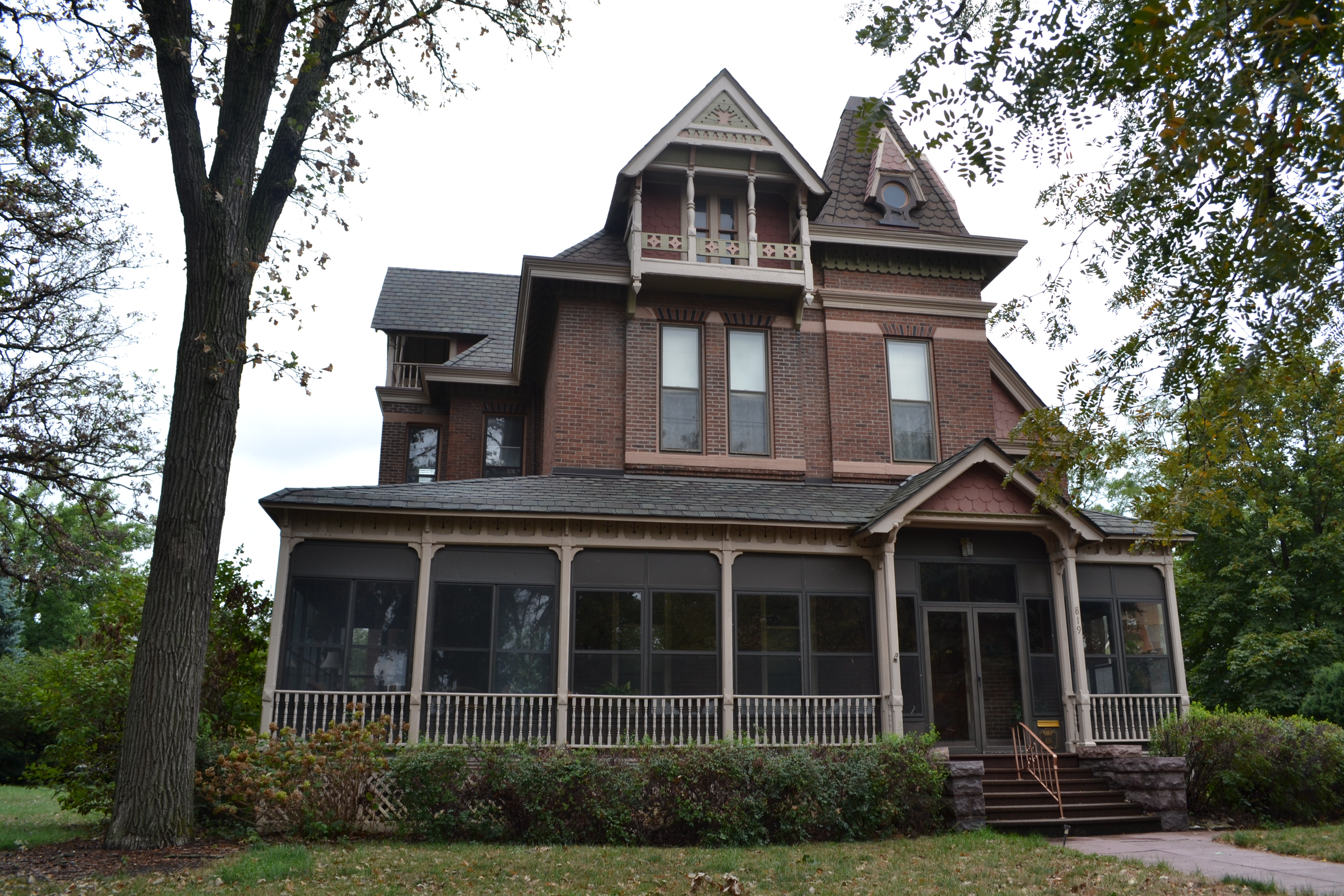
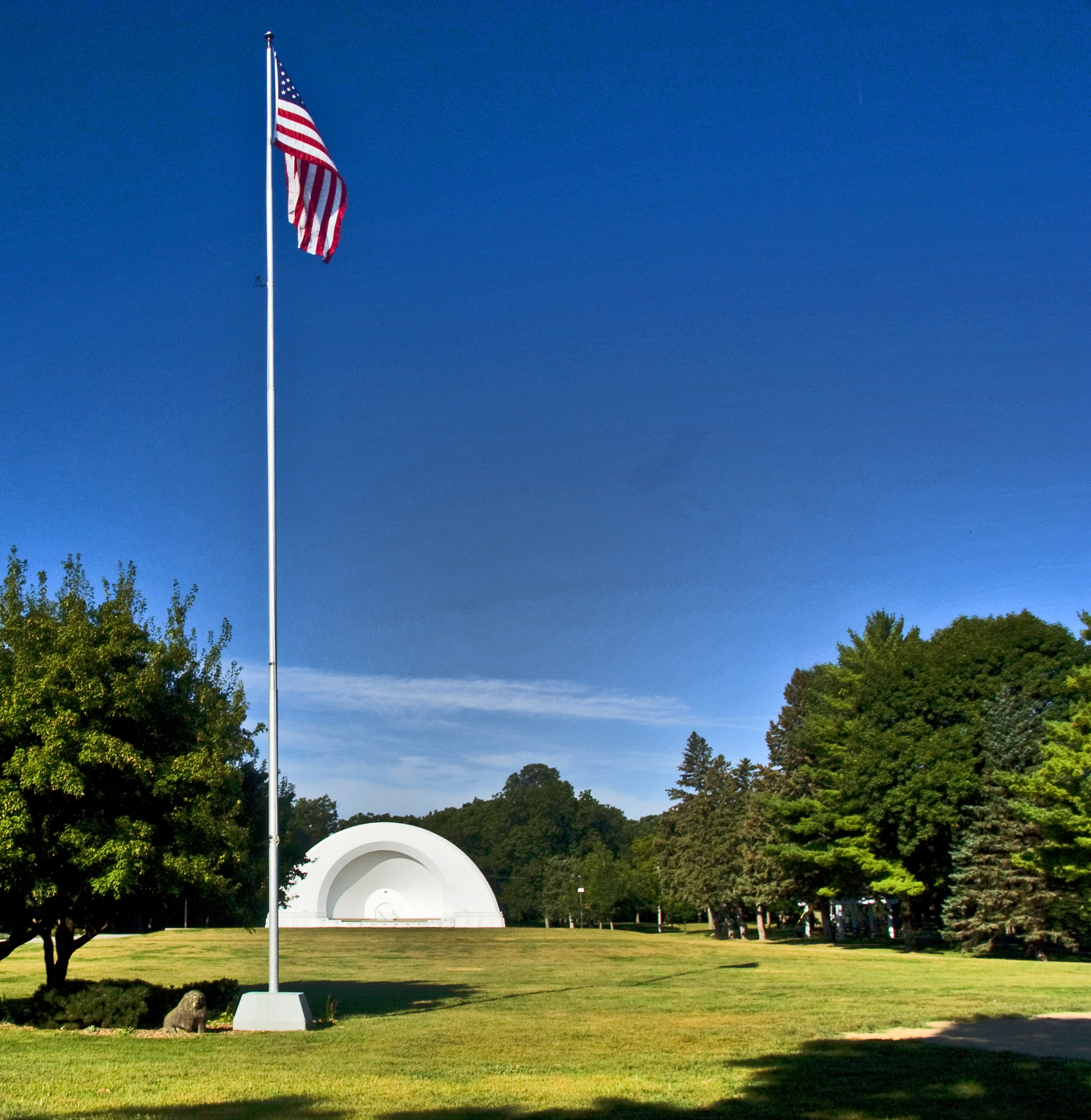
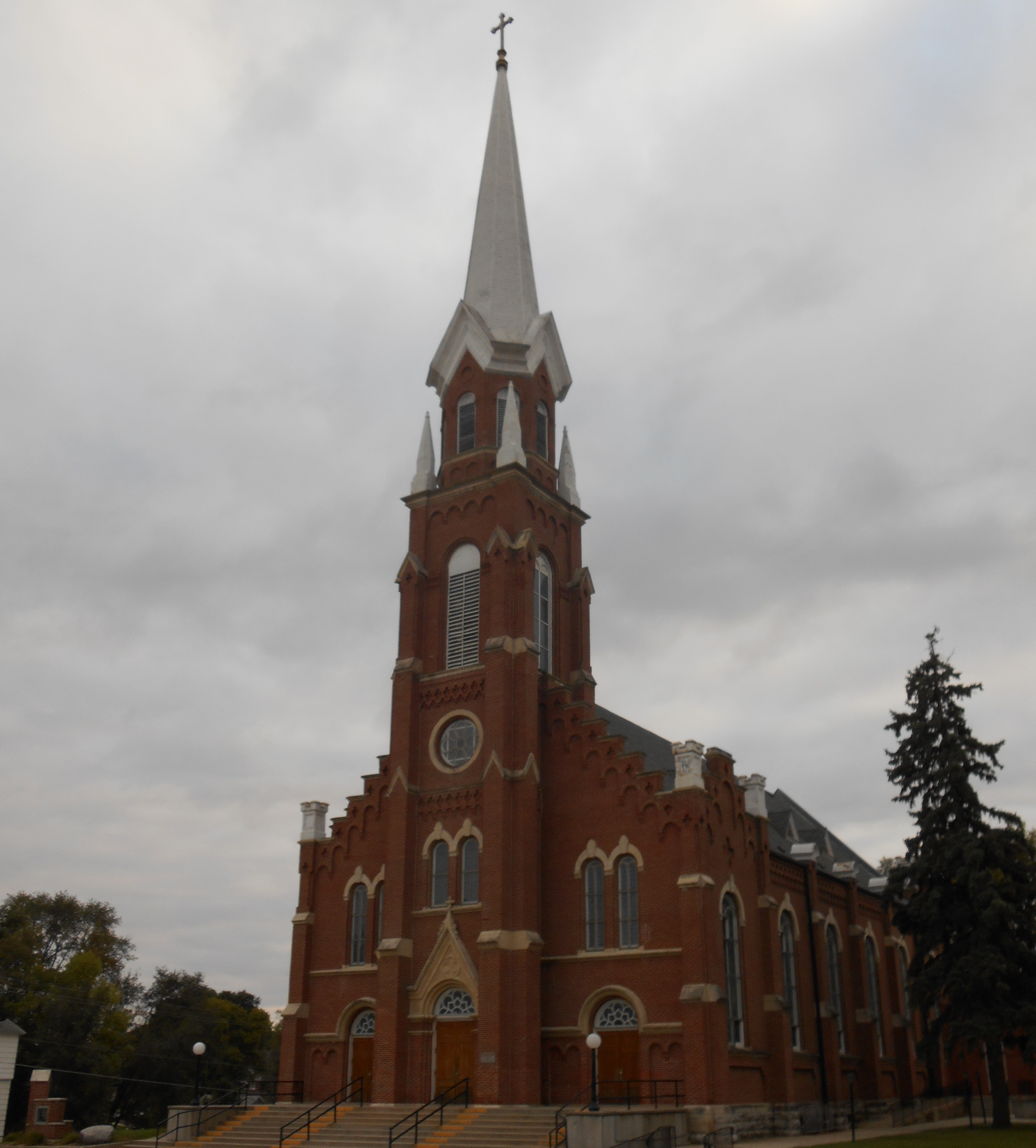
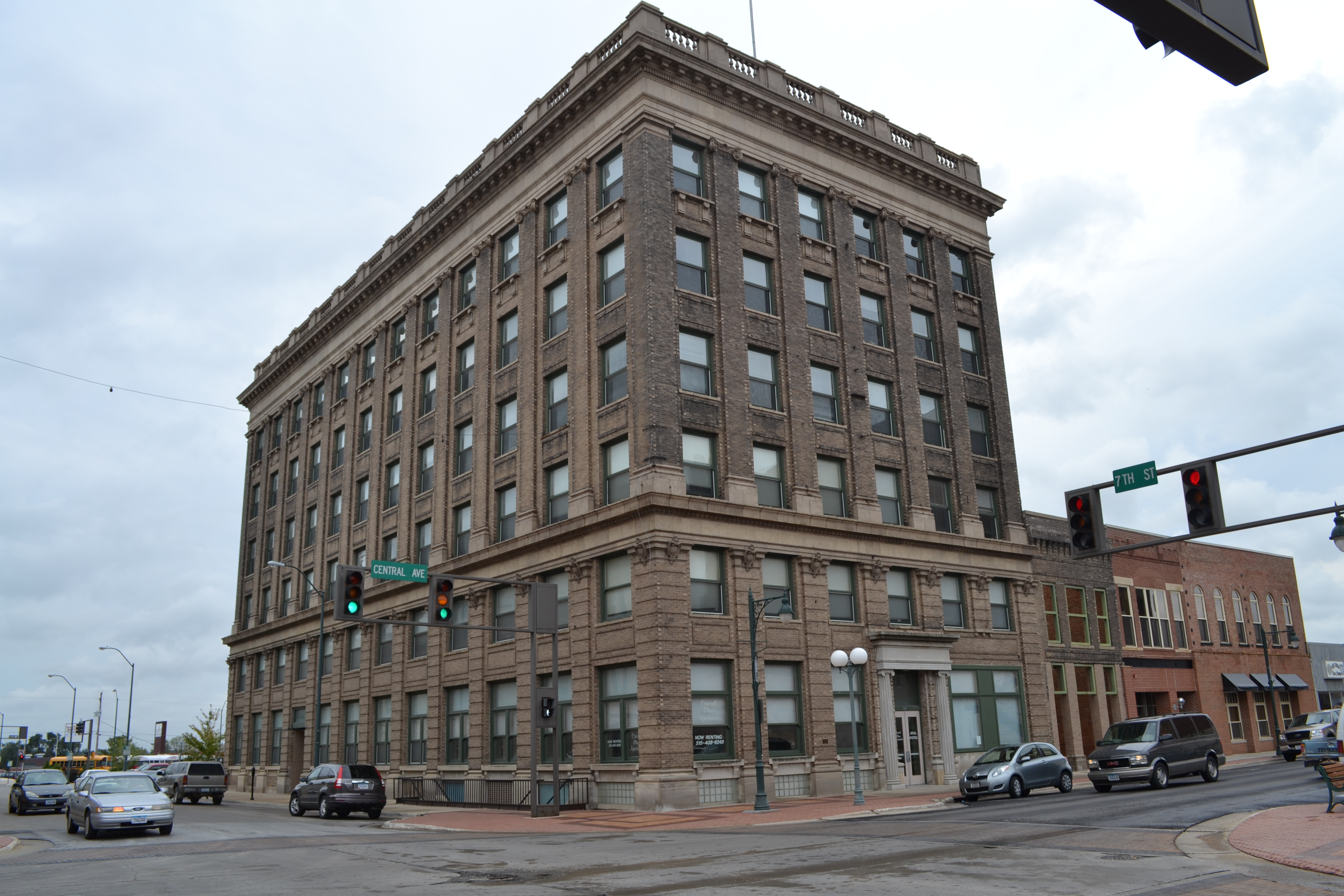
- Downtown Fort Dodge Oak Hill Historic District Oleson Park Corpus Christi Church First National Bank Building

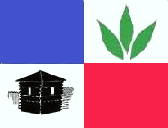
- Flag Seal
- Motto: Frontier of the Future
- Location in the State of Iowa
- Coordinates: 42°30′09″N 94°10′15″W
- Country: United States
- State: Iowa
- County: Webster
- Incorporated: 1869

Area
  - Total: 16.27 sq mi (42.15 km^{2})
  - Land: 16.01 sq mi (41.46 km^{2})
  - Water: 0.27 sq mi (0.69 km^{2})
- Elevation: 1,112 ft (339 m)

Population (2020)
  - Total: 24,871
  - Density: 1,553.7/sq mi (599.87/km^{2})
- Time zone: UTC−6 (CST)
  - Summer (DST): UTC−5 (CDT)
- ZIP Code: 50501
- Area code: 515
- FIPS code: 19-28515
- GNIS feature ID: 467843
- Website: www.fortdodge.gov

Fort Dodge is a city in and the county seat of Webster County, Iowa, United States, along the Des Moines River. The population was 24,871 in the 2020 census, a decrease from 25,136 in 2000. Fort Dodge is a major commercial center for North Central and Northwest Iowa. It is located on U.S. Routes 20 and 169.

== History ==
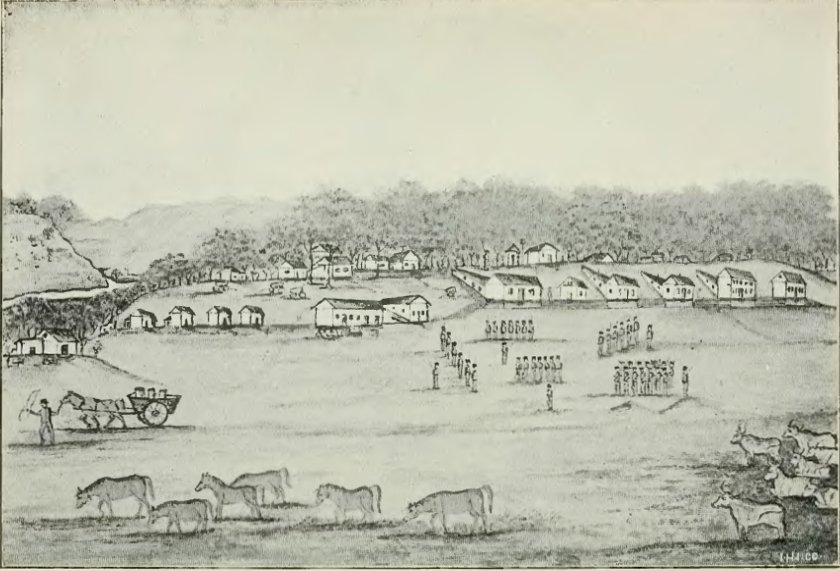
Fort Dodge, illustrated by William Williams, 1852.

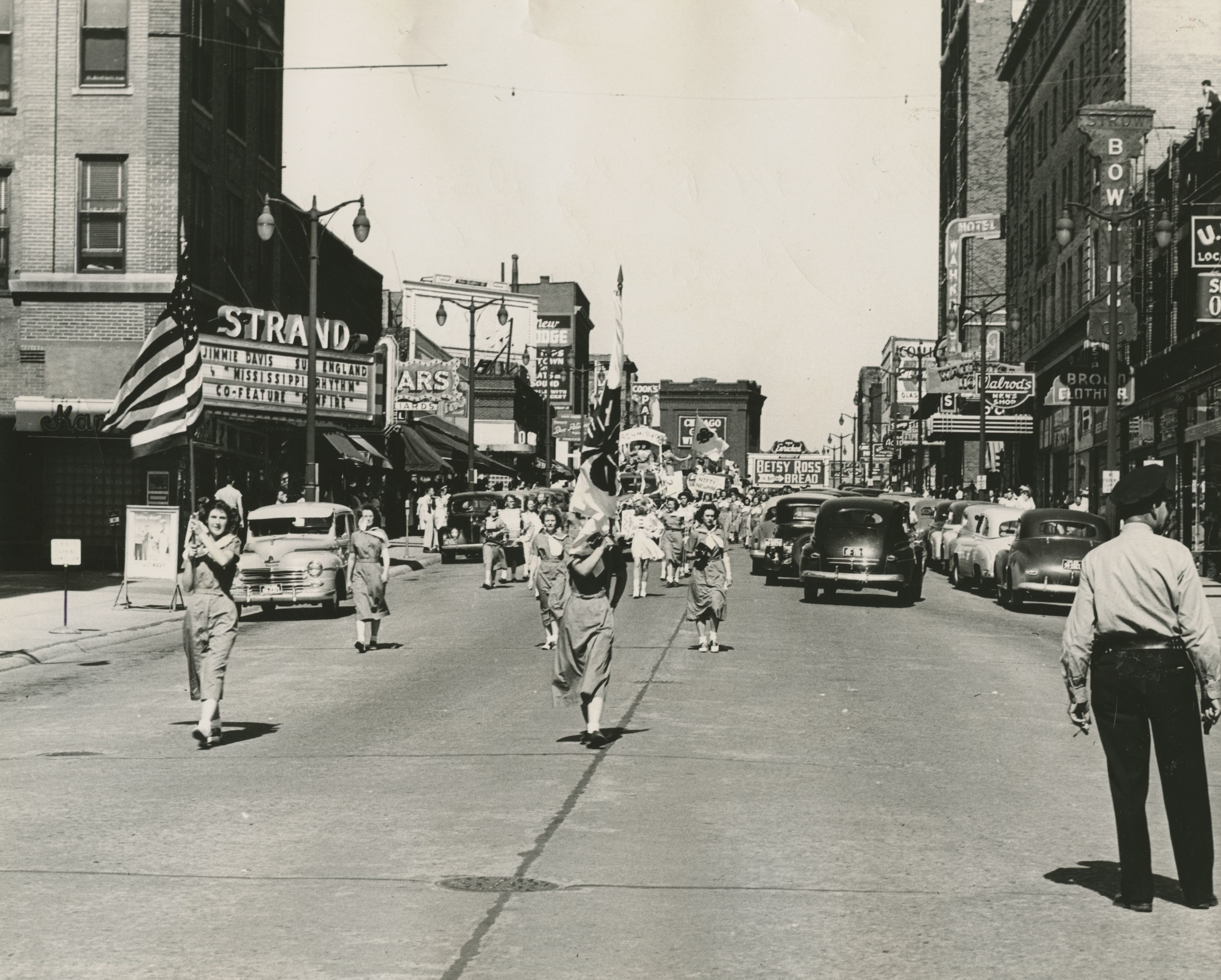
Girls Rally Day parade on Central Avenue

Fort Dodge traces its beginnings to 1850 when Capt. Samuel Woods, with his E Company of the 6th Infantry were sent from Fort Snelling to erect and garrison a fort at the junction of the Des Moines River and Lizard Creek, they arrived August 2, 1850. It was originally named Fort Clarke, in honor of Brev. Brig. Gen. Newman S. Clarke, colonel of the Sixth 151, but was renamed Fort Dodge because there was another fort with the same name in Texas. It was named after Henry Dodge, a governor of Wisconsin Territory (which had included Iowa until Iowa became a state in 1846). The fort was abandoned by the Army in 1853.

The next year William Williams, a civilian storekeeper in Fort Dodge, purchased the land and buildings of the old fort. The town of Fort Dodge was founded in 1869. In 1872 the long and continuing history of gypsum production in Iowa started when George Ringland, Webb Vincent, and Stillman T. Meservey formed the Fort Dodge Plaster Mills to mine, grind, and prepare gypsum for commercial use. The Company constructed the first gypsum mill west of the Mississippi River, at the head of what is now known as Gypsum Creek.

In 2018, Kris Patrick, executive director of Fort Dodge Main Street, stated that Fort Dodge is locally referred to as "Little Chicago" because architects modeled downtown buildings to resemble Chicago in the mid-1800s.

== Geography ==
Fort Dodge is located on the Des Moines River.

According to the United States Census Bureau, the city has a total area of 16.31 square miles (42.24 km^{2}), of which 16.05 square miles (41.57 km^{2}) is land and 0.26 square miles (0.67 km^{2}) is water.

=== Climate ===
Fort Dodge has a Humid continental climate with cold winters and hot humid summers.

Climate data for Fort Dodge, Iowa (1991–2020 normals, extremes 1899–present)
| Month | Jan | Feb | Mar | Apr | May | Jun | Jul | Aug | Sep | Oct | Nov | Dec | Year |
|---|---|---|---|---|---|---|---|---|---|---|---|---|---|
| Record high °F (°C) | 66 (19) | 67 (19) | 88 (31) | 100 (38) | 106 (41) | 104 (40) | 110 (43) | 109 (43) | 103 (39) | 95 (35) | 87 (31) | 69 (21) | 110 (43) |
| Mean maximum °F (°C) | 46.9 (8.3) | 51.1 (10.6) | 69.9 (21.1) | 82.2 (27.9) | 89.1 (31.7) | 91.7 (33.2) | 92.8 (33.8) | 90.5 (32.5) | 88.6 (31.4) | 82.5 (28.1) | 67.9 (19.9) | 51.8 (11.0) | 94.2 (34.6) |
| Mean daily maximum °F (°C) | 25.5 (−3.6) | 30.5 (−0.8) | 43.9 (6.6) | 58.8 (14.9) | 69.9 (21.1) | 79.7 (26.5) | 82.7 (28.2) | 80.3 (26.8) | 74.2 (23.4) | 61.3 (16.3) | 45.1 (7.3) | 31.3 (−0.4) | 56.9 (13.8) |
| Daily mean °F (°C) | 16.4 (−8.7) | 21.0 (−6.1) | 33.8 (1.0) | 46.8 (8.2) | 58.7 (14.8) | 69.0 (20.6) | 72.4 (22.4) | 69.9 (21.1) | 62.3 (16.8) | 49.5 (9.7) | 35.1 (1.7) | 22.7 (−5.2) | 46.5 (8.1) |
| Mean daily minimum °F (°C) | 7.4 (−13.7) | 11.5 (−11.4) | 23.8 (−4.6) | 34.8 (1.6) | 47.5 (8.6) | 58.4 (14.7) | 62.0 (16.7) | 59.5 (15.3) | 50.5 (10.3) | 37.7 (3.2) | 25.1 (−3.8) | 14.1 (−9.9) | 36.0 (2.2) |
| Mean minimum °F (°C) | −13.7 (−25.4) | −8.8 (−22.7) | 2.2 (−16.6) | 21.1 (−6.1) | 34.3 (1.3) | 47.1 (8.4) | 52.4 (11.3) | 50.2 (10.1) | 35.7 (2.1) | 23.2 (−4.9) | 8.5 (−13.1) | −6.3 (−21.3) | −17.1 (−27.3) |
| Record low °F (°C) | −35 (−37) | −30 (−34) | −22 (−30) | 6 (−14) | 21 (−6) | 34 (1) | 42 (6) | 35 (2) | 20 (−7) | −4 (−20) | −9 (−23) | −26 (−32) | −35 (−37) |
| Average precipitation inches (mm) | 0.95 (24) | 1.23 (31) | 1.96 (50) | 3.72 (94) | 4.57 (116) | 5.53 (140) | 4.20 (107) | 4.26 (108) | 2.81 (71) | 2.55 (65) | 1.85 (47) | 1.46 (37) | 35.09 (891) |
| Average snowfall inches (cm) | 8.6 (22) | 11.8 (30) | 5.6 (14) | 1.5 (3.8) | 0.4 (1.0) | 0.0 (0.0) | 0.0 (0.0) | 0.0 (0.0) | 0.0 (0.0) | 0.4 (1.0) | 2.8 (7.1) | 7.9 (20) | 39.0 (99) |
| Average precipitation days (≥ 0.01 in) | 6.3 | 6.7 | 7.5 | 9.9 | 13.1 | 11.2 | 8.7 | 8.9 | 8.0 | 7.5 | 5.7 | 7.1 | 100.6 |
| Average snowy days (≥ 0.1 in) | 4.9 | 5.3 | 2.9 | 1.1 | 0.1 | 0.0 | 0.0 | 0.0 | 0.0 | 0.3 | 1.7 | 5.0 | 21.3 |
Source: NOAA

== Demographics ==
Historical population
| Census | Pop. | Note | %± |
|---|---|---|---|
| 1860 | 672 | | — |
| 1870 | 3,095 | | 360.6% |
| 1880 | 3,586 | | 15.9% |
| 1890 | 4,871 | | 35.8% |
| 1900 | 12,162 | | 149.7% |
| 1910 | 15,543 | | 27.8% |
| 1920 | 19,347 | | 24.5% |
| 1930 | 21,895 | | 13.2% |
| 1940 | 22,904 | | 4.6% |
| 1950 | 25,115 | | 9.7% |
| 1960 | 28,399 | | 13.1% |
| 1970 | 31,263 | | 10.1% |
| 1980 | 29,423 | | −5.9% |
| 1990 | 25,894 | | −12.0% |
| 2000 | 25,136 | | −2.9% |
| 2010 | 25,206 | | 0.3% |
| 2020 | 24,871 | | −1.3% |
U.S. Decennial Census

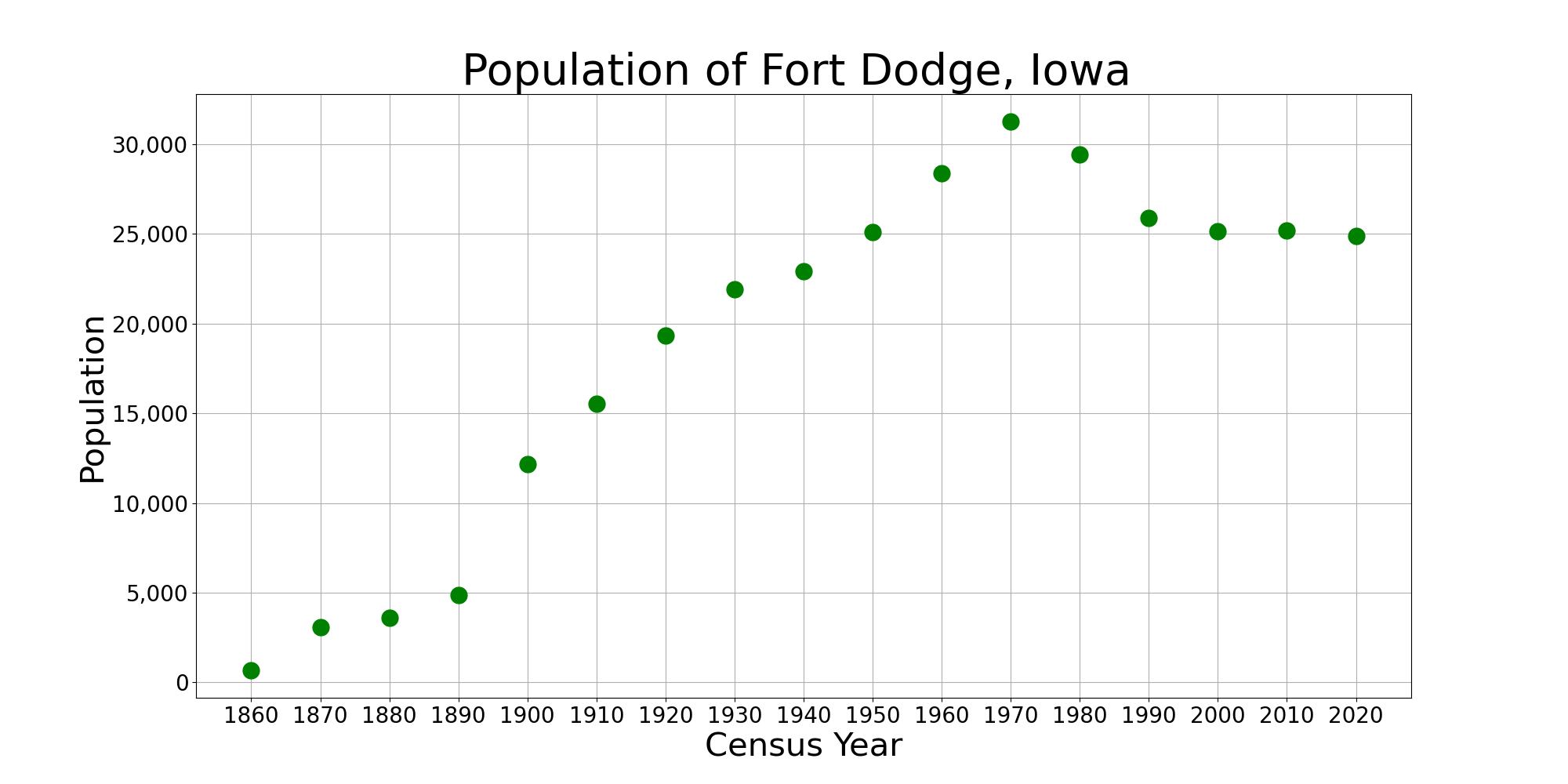
The population of Fort Dodge, Iowa from US census data

=== 2020 census ===
As of the 2020 census, Fort Dodge had a population of 24,871 and 9,946 households, of which 5,428 were families. The population density was 1,553.7 inhabitants per square mile (599.9/km^{2}).

The median age was 38.3 years. 20.5% of residents were under the age of 18 and 19.2% were 65 years of age or older. For every 100 females there were 107.6 males, and for every 100 females age 18 and over there were 107.7 males age 18 and over.

Of the 9,946 households, 25.3% had children under the age of 18 living in them; 36.1% were married-couple households; 23.1% were households with a male householder and no spouse or partner present; 32.9% were households with a female householder and no spouse or partner present; and 8.0% were cohabitating couples. About 45.4% of households were non-families, 39.4% of all households were made up of individuals, and 16.8% had someone living alone who was 65 years of age or older.

There were 11,298 housing units at an average density of 705.8 per square mile (272.5/km^{2}); 12.0% were vacant. The homeowner vacancy rate was 2.5% and the rental vacancy rate was 15.5%.

98.0% of residents lived in urban areas, while 2.0% lived in rural areas.

Racial composition as of the 2020 census
| Race | Number | Percent |
|---|---|---|
| White | 20,708 | 83.3% |
| Black or African American | 1,750 | 7.0% |
| American Indian and Alaska Native | 146 | 0.6% |
| Asian | 257 | 1.0% |
| Native Hawaiian and Other Pacific Islander | 14 | 0.1% |
| Some other race | 544 | 2.2% |
| Two or more races | 1,452 | 5.8% |
| Hispanic or Latino (of any race) | 1,693 | 6.8% |

=== 2010 census ===
As of the census of 2010, there were 25,206 people, 10,275 households, and 5,850 families residing in the city. The population density was 1,570.5 inhabitants per square mile (606.4/km^{2}). There were 11,215 housing units at an average density of 698.8 per square mile (269.8/km^{2}). The racial makeup of the city was 90% White, 5.5% African American, 0.4% Native American, 0.8% Asian, 1.4% from other races, and 2.2% from two or more races. Hispanic or Latino of any race were 5.0% of the population.

There were 10,275 households, of which 27.5% had children under the age of 18 living with them, 39.5% were married couples living together, 13.0% had a female householder with no husband present, 4.4% had a male householder with no wife present, and 43.1% were non-families. 36.8% of all households were made up of individuals, and 14.4% had someone living alone who was 65 years of age or older. The average household size was 2.21 and the average family size was 2.89.

The median age in the city was 36.8 years. 21.8% of residents were under the age of 18; 13.2% were between the ages of 18 and 24; 23.4% were from 25 to 44; 25.3% were from 45 to 64; and 16.2% were 65 years of age or older. The gender makeup of the city was 51.3% male and 48.7% female.

=== 2000 census ===
As of the census of 2000, there were 25,136 people, 10,470 households, and 6,376 families residing in the city. The population density was 1,726.1 inhabitants per square mile (666.5/km^{2}). There were 11,168 housing units at an average density of 766.9 per square mile (296.1/km^{2}). The racial makeup of the city was 92.47% White, 3.79% African American, 0.21% Native American, 0.85% Asian, 0.02% Pacific Islander, 1.30% from other races, and 1.36% from two or more races. Hispanic or Latino of any race were 2.94% of the population.

There were 10,470 households, out of which 29.0% had children under the age of 18 living with them, 45.9% were married couples living together, 11.4% had a female householder with no husband present, and 39.1% were non-families. 33.8% of all households were made up of individuals, and 14.1% had someone living alone who was 65 years of age or older. The average household size was 2.29 and the average family size was 2.94.

Age spread: 24.3% under the age of 18, 10.7% from 18 to 24, 25.2% from 25 to 44, 21.2% from 45 to 64, and 18.5% who were 65 years of age or older. The median age was 38 years. For every 100 females, there were 90.5 males. For every 100 females age 18 and over, there were 86.7 males.

The median income for a household in the city was $33,361, and the median income for a family was $42,555. Males had a median income of $31,253 versus $23,360 for females. The per capita income for the city was $18,018. About 7.7% of families and 11.6% of the population were below the poverty line, including 14.2% of those under age 18 and 7.2% of those age 65 or over.

== Economy ==
The major industries of Fort Dodge are biofuels, livestock feed (especially corn), gypsum and limestone mining, can production, drywall manufacturing, trucking, the manufacture of veterinary pharmaceuticals and vaccines, and retail.

Gypsum rock is processed into drywall and plaster products at several Fort Dodge manufacturing facilities. Drywall was patented by a Fort Dodge resident, and the gypsum used to create the Cardiff Giant hoax of the late 19th century was mined at Fort Dodge. Currently National Gypsum Company, Georgia Pacific Corporation, Celotex Corporation (now CertainTeed corporation) and the United States Gypsum Company operate gypsum facilities in and around Fort Dodge.

Fort Dodge is the home of Elanco, the facility was previously owned by Boehringer Ingelheim, a major producer of pharmaceuticals and vaccines for veterinarian use. The company's headquarters were moved from Fort Dodge to Overland Park, Kansas in 1995. Two of the company's three United States manufacturing plants are located in Fort Dodge.

In 2022, Cargill announced it would build a corn syrup refinery in Fort Dodge.

At least three major national trucking companies (primarily flatbed carriers serving the drywall industry) are based in Fort Dodge. The city also serves as a retail center for North-Central Iowa.

For most of the 20th century, meatpacking was a major industry in Fort Dodge. The last two large meatpacking plants (owned by Iowa Beef Processors and Hormel) closed during the 1980s, when such companies moved their facilities closer to beef production in western states such as the Dakotas. One of the laboratories of Fort Dodge Animal Health was built on the site of a former Hormel processing plant.

The Fort Dodge Correctional Facility, a 1,250-bed medium-security state prison, opened in 1998.

== Arts and culture ==
=== Historical ===
The Fort Museum and Frontier Village is located on the southwest edge of Fort Dodge. It is a full-scale recreation of a military outpost on the prairie from the 19th century. It also features a reconstructed village from the same time period. Additionally, The Fort Museum has a replica of the Cardiff Giant, an archaeological hoax sculpted from gypsum mined at Fort Dodge. A "Frontier Days" event is held annually on the Fort Museum grounds. It features a parade, beauty pageant, historical reenactments, a buckskinner camp, and live entertainment. 2014 marked the 40th year of the event. Not all portrayals of early history at the Fort Museum are historically accurate and the facility is intended to be more of a tourist attraction as opposed to an actual museum.

The Blanden Memorial Art Museum, the first public museum of art in the state of Iowa, is located in the historic Oak Hill district of Fort Dodge. The Blanden opened June 5, 1932. The permanent collection on display includes European and American artists prints, sculptures and paintings. The museum also offers art classes for children and adults.

=== Music ===
Fort Dodge maintains several music organizations, including a civic choral society, a city-funded municipal band, regional symphony orchestra, a Christian choral union, and a men's barbershop chorus. In 1896, the famous composer Edvard Grieg composed a piece entitled "Impromptu to Grieg Men's Chorus in Fort Dodge, Iowa."

Shellabration is an annual rock concert held in late July/early August at the Oleson Park Music Pavilion, featuring nationally touring rock groups. Previous performing bands include Styx, Foreigner, REO Speedwagon, and Lynyrd Skynyrd.

The Lizard Creek Blues Society sponsors an annual blues festival, "Blues Under the Trees", every summer, drawing blues musicians from all over the United States.

Fort Dodge has most recently been named the "Live Music Capital of Iowa." It is home to various live music venues hosting a variety of local aspiring artists and bands.

Fort Dodge Choir Boosters (affiliated with Fort Dodge Senior High School) hosts the annual "Fort Dodge Choral Festival", which features high school and college choirs from around the upper Midwest under the direction of a nationally recognized conductor/composer.

Fort Dodge Senior High School serves as a host location for the Iowa State Marching Band Festival, State Solo & Small Ensemble Festival, and regional high school jazz band competitions.

=== Theater ===
Theater and musical theater are historically popular arts activities in Fort Dodge, with the community maintaining three independent theater organizations. Hawkeye Community Theatre puts on six full-length productions a year of varied genre. Comedia Musica Players is a civic musical theater troupe that produces an annual musical each fall. Stage Door Productions provides theater training and performance opportunities for middle school, high school, and college-aged students during the summer. It produces one small-cast (10 or fewer) play per year.

The two local high schools and the community college produce a student-cast musical each Spring. The Fort Dodge Senior High School musical is the longest-running high school musical theater tradition in the United States, first produced in 1927.

=== Historical structures ===
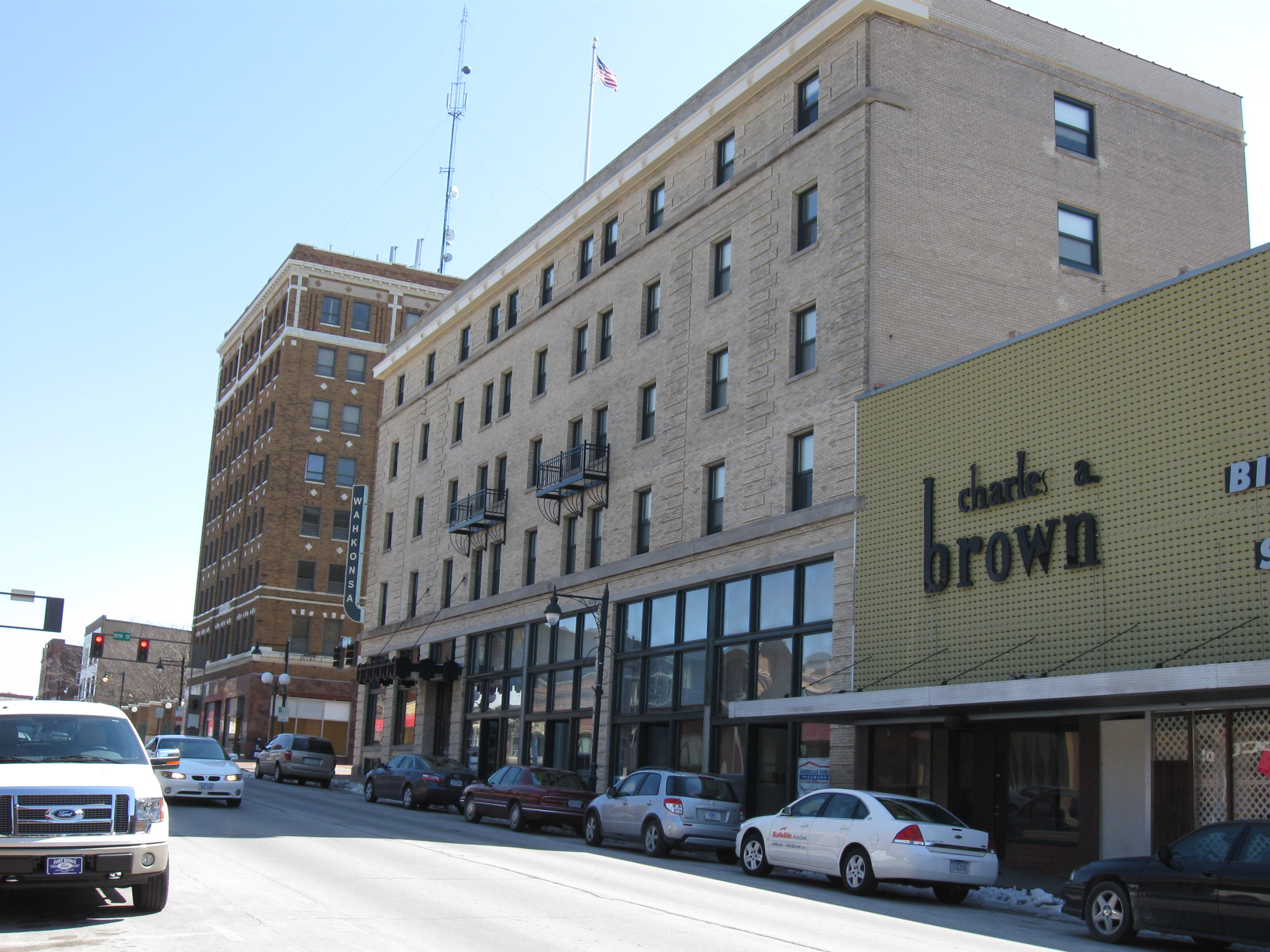
Wahkonsa Hotel

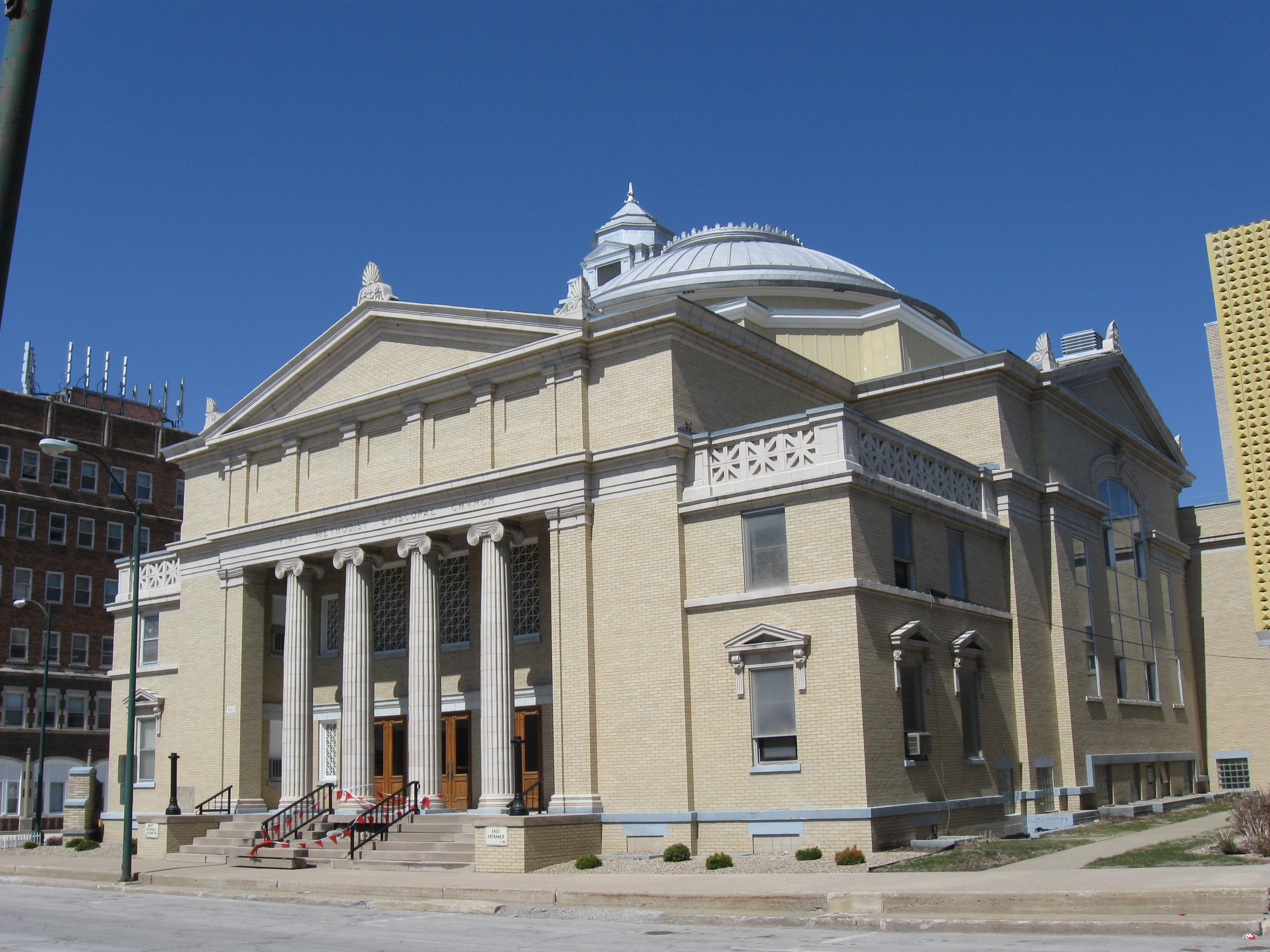
First United Methodist Church

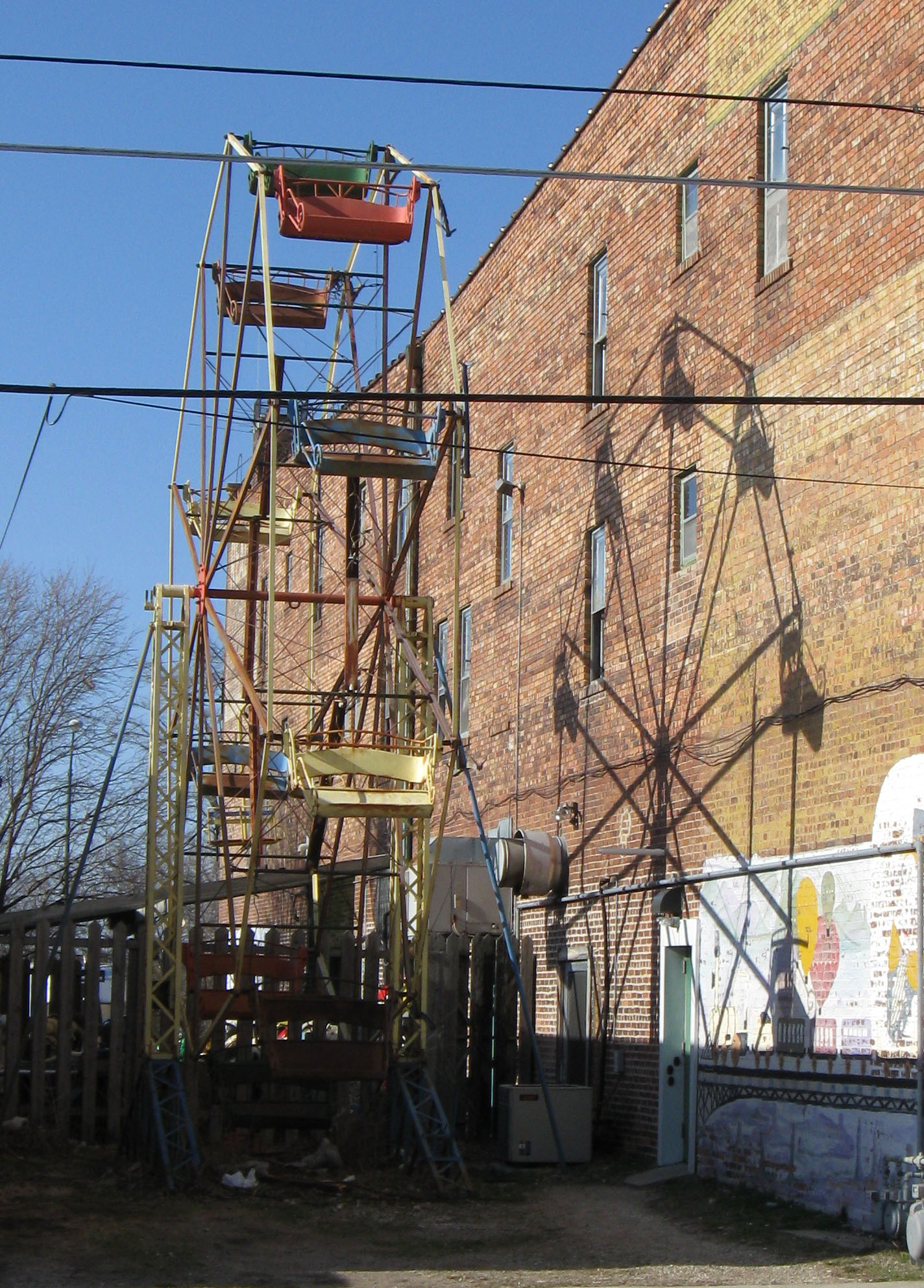
Abandoned Ferris wheel, now located in Eagle Grove, Iowa

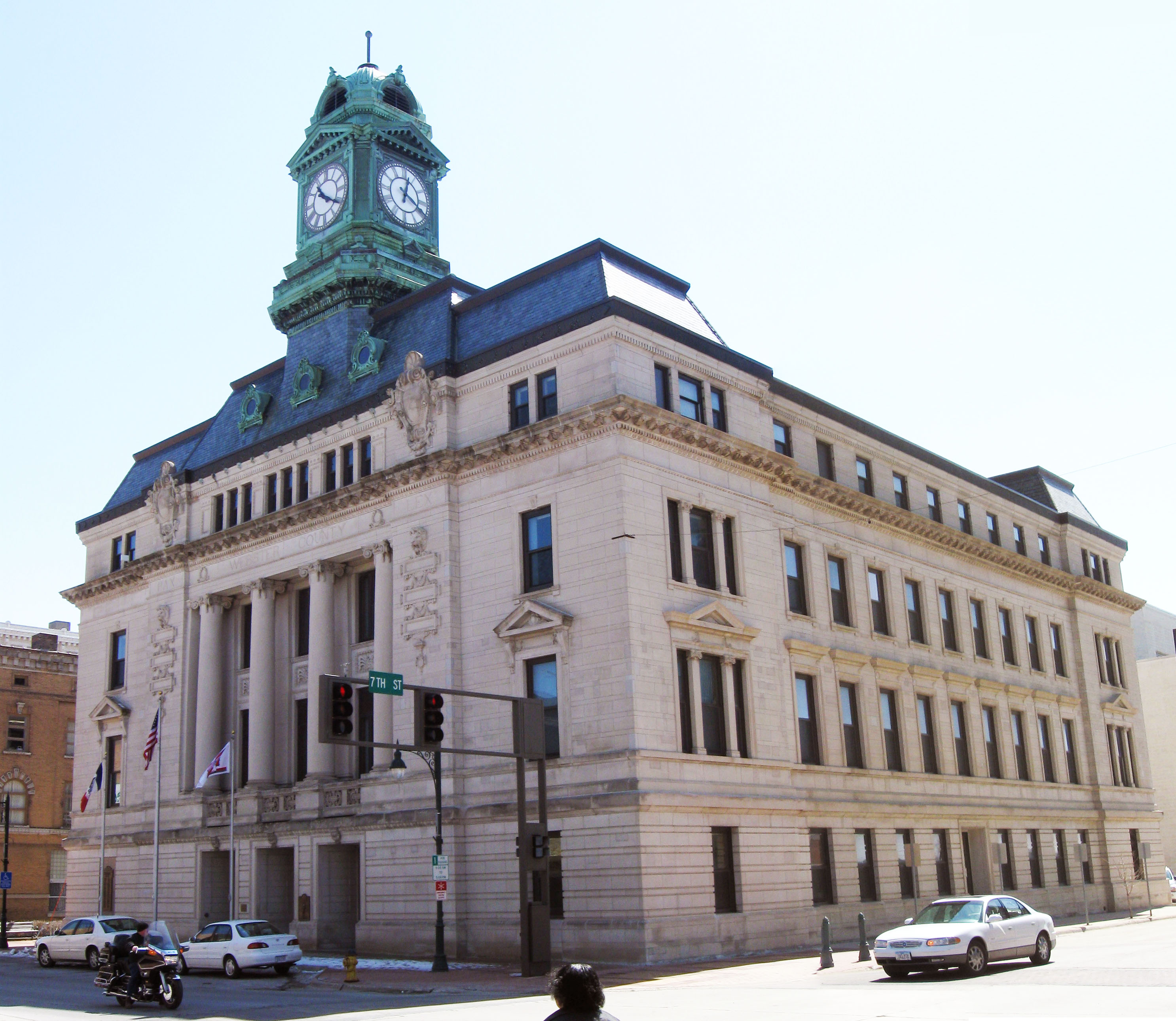
County Courthouse

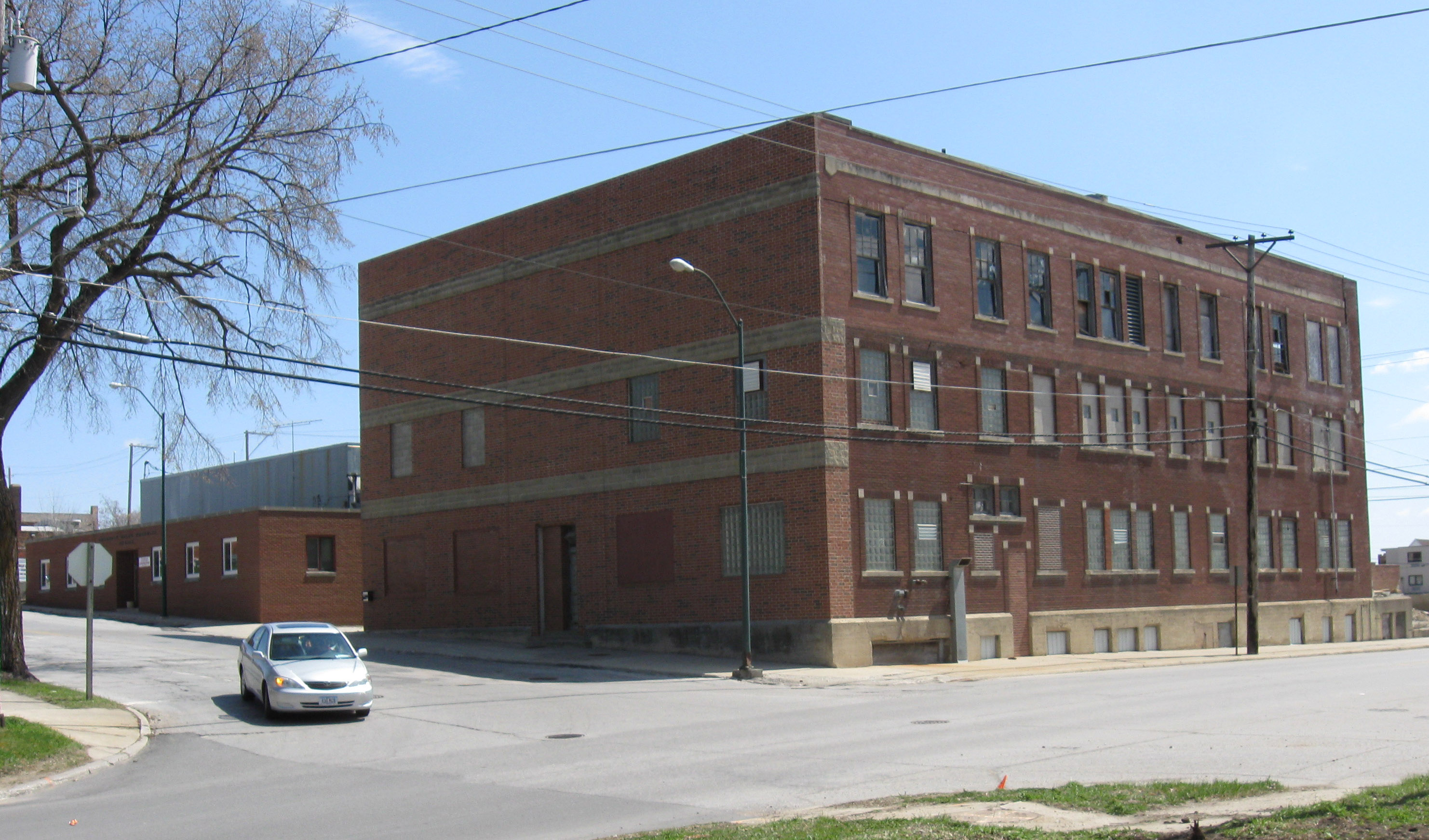
Abandoned Rosedale Dairy

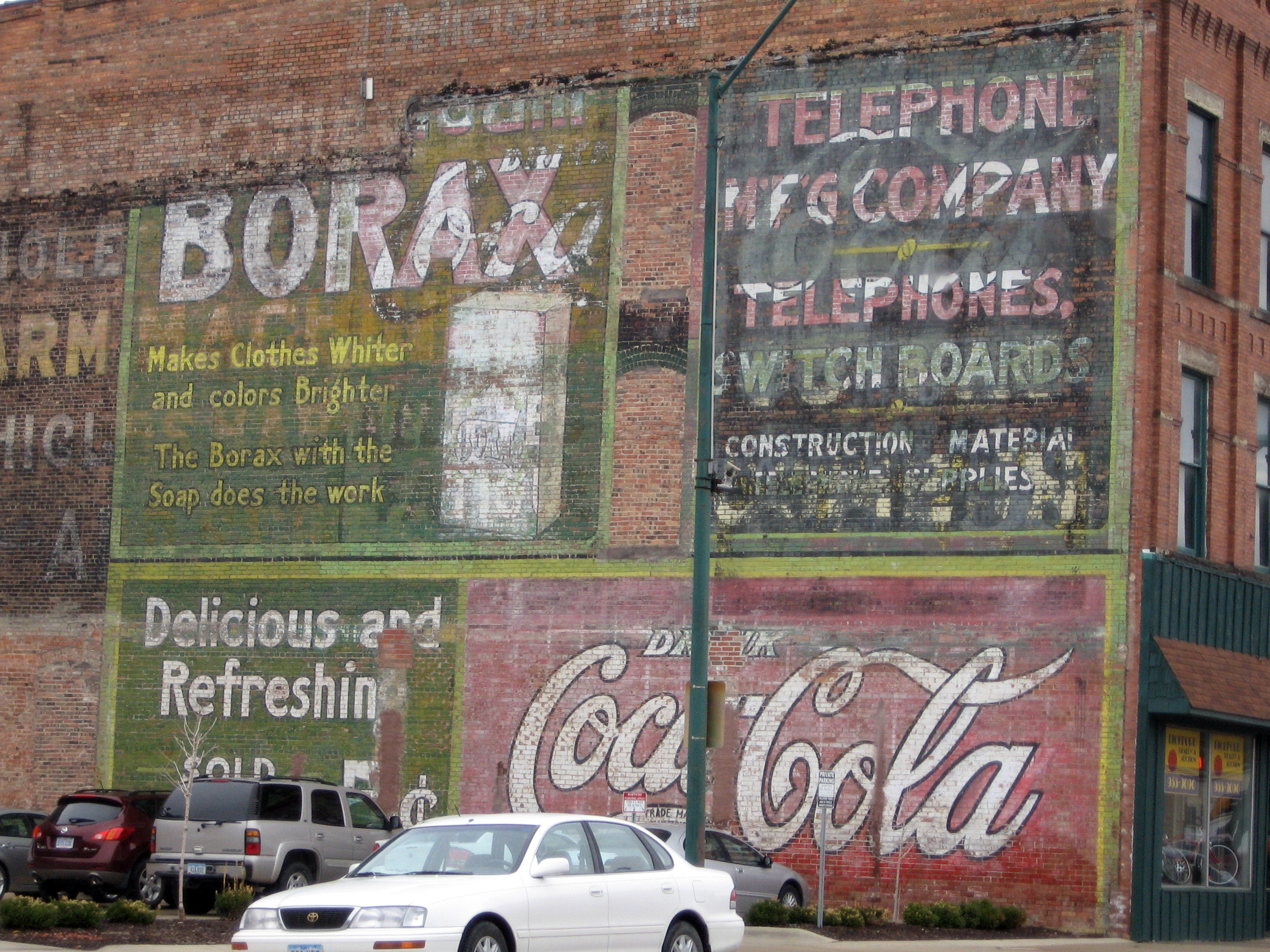
Downtown Ghost sign

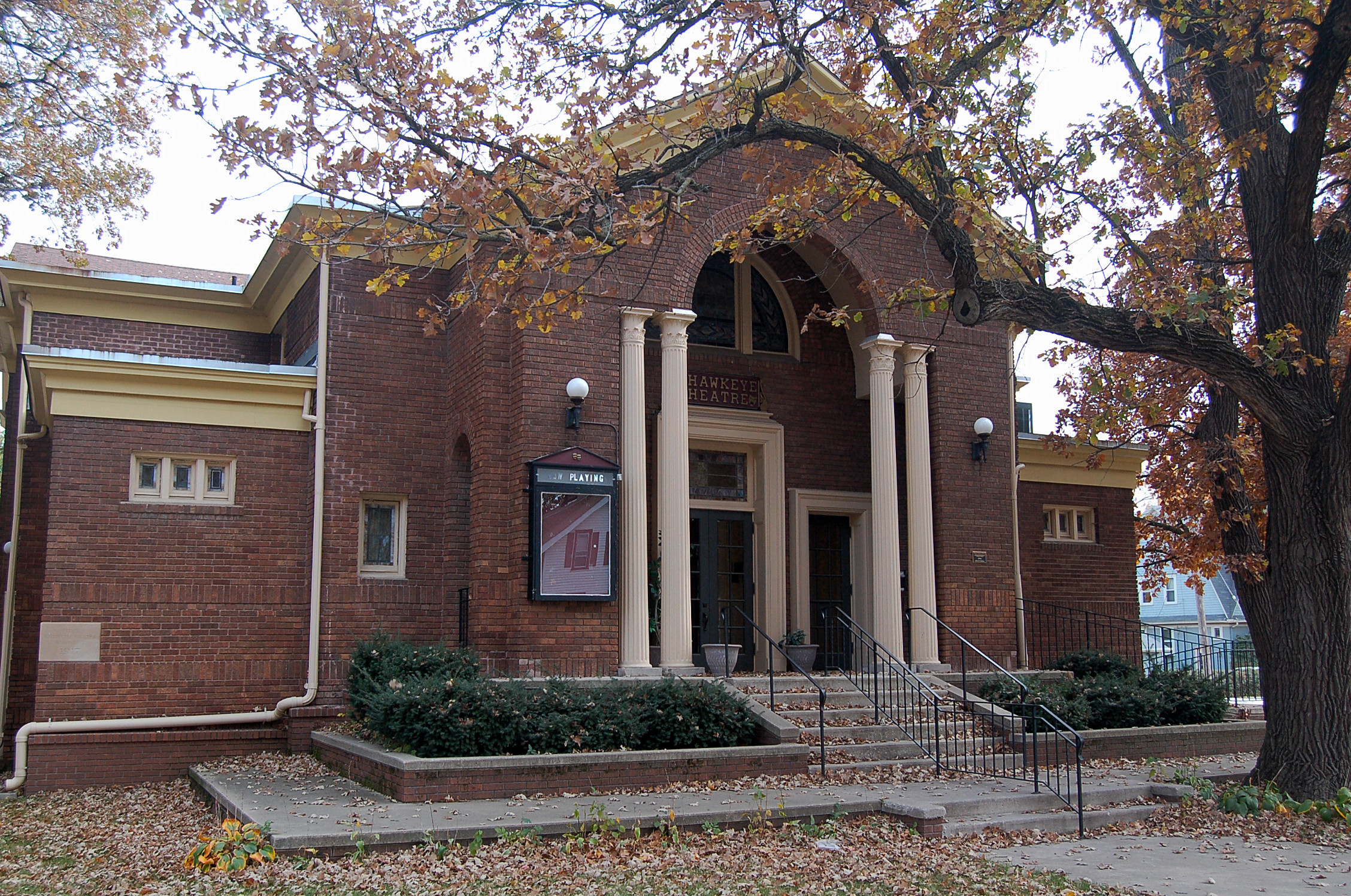
Hawkeye Theatre

== Parks and recreation ==
Oleson Park has woods and hiking trails. The city's recently restored band shell is located here.

Matt Cosgrove River's Edge Discovery Center, 20 N 1st Street, Fort Dodge, had its grand opening in 2024. It is a hub for conservation and recreation in Webster County. A place that not only welcomes those who come to learn and play but also tells the story of the land and water that we enjoy. Matt Cosgrove River's Edge Discovery Center

Snell-Crawford Park (located at Williams Drive and 12th Avenue North) is a local favorite for weekend recreation. It has a disc golf course, three sand volleyball courts, a jogging/walking/bicycling trail, picnic tables, and grills. Soldier Creek runs through the park.

Rosedale Rapids, the city's new multimillion-dollar aquatic center, opened north of the roundabout intersection of 10th Avenue North and North 32nd Street in July 2010. The aquatic center features swimming pools, water slides, and a lazy river.

John F. Kennedy Park is the nearest camping facility to Fort Dodge. It has a large campground, a lake with a swimming beach, a playground, and hiking trails. Lakeside Municipal Golf Course, an 18-hole course, is located here.

The 300 acres (1.2 km^{2}) Gypsum City Off-Highway Vehicle Park opened to the public on July 6, 2006. The park is located on abandoned gypsum mines. Plans are in place for the park to be expanded to as much as 1,500 acres (6.1 km^{2}) in the future.

Fort Dodge is a tubing destination in the state, offering the waters of Lizard Creek, solitude on the Des Moines River from Fort Dodge to the Dolliver Memorial State Park, and the nearby lake at Brushy Creek.

The Fort Dodge Country Club par 71 golf course is one of Iowa's top courses.

Woodman Hollow State Preserve lies roughly 7 miles southeast of Fort Dodge.

Fort Frenzy opened in the eastern part of the city in late 2013. It features family-friendly activities such as an arcade, bumper boats, bumper cars, mini golf, go karts, laser tag, and bowling.

== Education ==
Fort Dodge is the home to the central campus of Iowa Central Community College.

Fort Dodge is served by the Fort Dodge Community School District. The public school system includes Fort Dodge Senior High School (9−12), Fort Dodge Middle School (5−8), and several elementary schools. Duncombe Elementary closed briefly in 2015 due to structural issues, and was operating in the former Fair Oaks Middle School. The new building opened in Fall 2018, and serves grades 1–4. Private schools in Fort Dodge include St. Edmond (Preschool−12), Community Christian School (Preschool−8), St Paul Lutheran (Preschool−8), and Harvest Baptist School (K−12).

Fort Dodge has been the location of Iowa High School Athletic Association championship events. Currently, the cross country championships are held at John F. Kennedy Park north of the city. Fort Dodge also hosts the Iowa girls' softball championship tournament at Harlan Rogers Park.

== Media ==
AM radio stations

- 540 KWMT (Three Eagles Communications, news/country/farm) 5 kW day/.2 kW night
- 1400 KVFD (Three Eagles Communications, news/talk/sports) – 1 kW

FM radio stations

- 88.1 KICB (Iowa Central Community College Broadcasting, "88.1 The Point", alternative rock) – 0.2 kW
- 89.5 KLFG (Family Radio, "Family Radio", Religious) – 17 kW
- 91.1 KNSK (Iowa State University/WOI Radio Group, NPR) 100 kW
- 92.1 KZLB (Three Eagles Communications, "The Eagle", Classic Rock) – 6 kW
- 94.5 KKEZ (Three Eagles Communications, "Mix 94.5", Hot Adult Contemporary) – 100 kW
- 96.9 KIAQ (Three Eagles Communications, "Hot Country K97", Country) – 100 kW
- 99.7 KXFT (Three Eagles Communications, "Sunny 99.7", Adult Contemporary) – 25 kW
- 105.9 KTLB (Three Eagles Communications, "Hippie Radio", Oldies) – 25 kW

Online radio stations

- Fort Dodge Radio (Fort Dodge Radio, "Less Talk. More Classic Rock.")

Broadcast television stations

- KTIN 21, local PBS member station, Iowa PBS network member.
- A commercial TV station, last known as KVFD-TV, an NBC affiliate, operated on channel 21 from 1953 until 1970 then moved to channel 50. On May 4, 1977, its tower and transmitter were destroyed by a tornado. The owner died before he could rebuild it, and his heirs were not interested in continuing it. KVFD was never rebuilt and the call letters have been returned to the FCC. Fort Dodge is served from the television stations in the Ames-Des Moines metro area.

Print

- Fort Dodge Messenger, daily newspaper

== Infrastructure ==
=== Surface transportation ===
U.S. Route 20 bypasses Fort Dodge to the south, and U.S. 169 skirts the west side of the city; both highways have business routes through town. Iowa Highway 7 has its terminus at the northwest edge of the city.

DART (Dodger Area Rapid Transit) maintains six local bus routes that connect to most commercial, medical, and educational locations on weekdays only.

Jefferson Bus lines serves Fort Dodge with a link to Williams, where travelers can connect to the expanded Jefferson line.

=== Airport ===
The Fort Dodge Regional Airport (FOD) is located just north of the city. It is primarily a general aviation airport.

== Health care ==
Unity Point Hospital, formerly Trinity Regional Medical Center, is Fort Dodge's only hospital.

== Sister cities ==
As of December 13, 2016, Fort Dodge has one sister city:

- Gjakova, Kosovo

== Notable people ==
- Lew Anderson (1922–2006), last Clarabell the Clown on Howdy Doody
- Samuel Z. Arkoff (1918–2002), B movie producer
- Cathie Beck (born 1955), journalist and writer
- Suzanne M. Bianchi (1952–2013), sociologist
- Joan Blaine (1910–1949), actress
- Scott Bloomquist (1963–2024), race car driver
- Clara Breed (1906–1994), activist on behalf of Japanese-Americans during World War II
- Holm O. Bursum (1867–1963), politician for the state of New Mexico
- Cyrus Clay Carpenter (1829–1898), Governor of Iowa
- Nick Collison (born 1980), professional basketball player
- Gene Elston (1922–2015), sportscaster and Baseball Hall of Fame honoree
- Nate Erdmann (born 1973), professional basketball player
- Lou Fiene (1884–1964), Major League Baseball pitcher
- Gene Ford (1912–1970), Major League Baseball pitcher
- Robert Garrison (1960–2019), sculptor
- William Greehey (born 1936), businessman and philanthropist. 2001 recipient of the Horatio Alger Award
- Thomas Heggen (1918–1949), author of Mister Roberts, which was made into a Broadway play and a Hollywood film
- Mack Hellings (1915–1951), racing driver
- Emil Lewis Holmdahl (1883–1963), American infantryman, soldier of fortune, and treasure hunter
- Walter Howey (1882–1954), journalist and editor
- Henry A. Kelly (born 1934), Scholar and research professor at University of California, Los Angeles.
- Mary Kelly (born 1941), artist, social activist, educator and writer
- Corita Kent (1918–1986), artist, social activist and nun
- William S. Kenyon (1869–1933), U.S. senator and federal appeals court judge
- Karl L. King (1891–1971), conductor
- Bill Koll (1923–2003), NCAA champion, Wrestling Hall of Fame member
- Lisa Koll (born 1987), NCAA record holder in 10,000 metres
- Mitch Krebs, news anchor
- Richard D. McCormick (born 1940), director of Wells Fargo & Company
- John M. Peters (1927–2013), member of the Iowa House of Representatives
- Katie Porter (born 1974), U.S. representative for California
- Daniel Rhodes (1911–1989), ceramic artist and author
- Steve Stark, television producer, president of production, MGM Television
- Brad Steiger (1936–2018), writer
- Jeff Struecker (born 1969), U.S. Army chaplain and author
- Bill Tilghman (1854–1924), lawman and gunslinger
- Don Ultang (1917–2008), Pulitzer Prize-winning photographer
- Betsy Warland (born 1946), poet and writer
- Dale Warland (born 1932), choral conductor and clinician
- Kevin Wickander (born 1965), MLB player
