= Bianchi =

Bianchi may refer to:

== Places ==
- Bianchi, Calabria, a comune in the Province of Cosenza, Italy

== Manufacturing ==
- Bianchi Bicycles (F.I.V. Edoardo Bianchi S.p.A.), an Italian manufacturer of bicycles, and former manufacturer of motorcycles and automobiles
  - Bianchi (motorcycles), a line of Italian motorcycles made from 1897 to 1967
  - Autobianchi, an automobile manufacturer co-founded in 1955 by Fiat, Bianchi and Pirelli, before being fully bought by Fiat in 1969.
- Bianchi International a leather product manufacturer based in California

== Sport ==
- Liquigas-Bianchi, a cycling team created from the merger of Team Bianchi and Liquigas
- Team Bianchi, a cycling team
- The Bianchi Cup, an NRA Action Pistol Championships
- Bianchi (cycling team), an Italian professional cycling team that was sponsored by and cycled on Bianchi Bicycles, 1899-2003

== Mathematics ==
- The Bianchi identities in differential geometry,
- The contracted Bianchi identities in general relativity,
- The Bianchi classification of 3D Lie algebras,
- The Bianchi group, the projective special group of a ring of integers.

== Other uses ==
- Bianchi (surname)
- Bianchi, another name for urinal in Asian countries.
- The Bianchi battuti or White Penitents, a flagellant movement of the 15th century
