= KWMT =

Radio station in Fort Dodge, Iowa

Coordinates: 42°29′44.9″N 94°12′33.9″W

- Fort Dodge, Iowa; United States
- Broadcast area: Iowa; Northwestern Illinois; Northern Missouri; Eastern Nebraska
- Frequency: 540 kHz
- Branding: AM 540 KWMT

Programming
- Format: Classic country

Ownership
- Owner: Connoisseur Media; (Alpha 3E Licensee LLC)
- Sister stations: KKEZ; KTLB; KIAQ; KVFD; KXFT; KZLB

History
- First air date: 1956
- Call sign meaning: a nod to WMT in Cedar Rapids

Technical information
- Licensing authority: FCC
- Facility ID: 35891
- Class: D
- Power: 5,000 watts day; 170 watts night

Links
- Public license information: Public file; LMS
- Webcast: Listen live
- Website: www.yourfortdodge.com/stations/540-kwmt/

KWMT (540 AM) is a commercial radio station in Fort Dodge, Iowa. The station is owned by Connoisseur Media and it has a classic country radio format with news, sports and farm information features. KWMT's slogan is "True Country". Its radio studios and offices are located on North 10th Street in Fort Dodge. KWMT was previously co-owned with WMT (600 AM) in Cedar Rapids; because of this, KWMT's call sign represents "WMT" plus a 'K' at the beginning.

KWMT broadcasts by day with a power of 5,000 watts. Because 540 AM is a Canadian and Mexican clear-channel frequency, power significantly drops to 170 watts at night. KWMT uses a directional antenna with a two-tower array. Much of its power is directed to the south of Fort Dodge, and the station limits its coverage to the north to protect Class A CBK, a station in Saskatchewan, Canada. KWMT's transmitter is off U.S. Route 169 at Avenue G in Fort Dodge. It is located in an area of high ground conductivity, which makes the 540 signal audible in parts of Iowa, Illinois, Missouri and Nebraska.

== Programming ==
In 2009, KWMT shifted its playlist to entirely classic country music, focusing largely on the 1950s through early 1990s. Some newer songs (mainly by neo-traditional country artists) recorded since the early 1990s have been retained, although since 2023 an increasing number of 1990s and early 2000s titles have been mixed into the playlist alongside classic country. In addition, songs recorded by local and Midwest country artists that did not necessarily gain nationwide exposure are also featured. Starting in 2026, the station shifted to primarily playing 1980s, 1990s and 2000s country music, largely phasing out the pre-1980s hits.

Prior to the switch to classic country, the station mixed in current and recurrent hits with oldies throughout the day, and dedicated one hour each weekday to exclusively classic country. A six-hour block on Saturday mornings for the classics was also set aside. On Sunday mornings, KWMT mixes Christian-related programming with Southern gospel music, featuring recordings from both current and classic artists. This program is called "Country Sunday", with retro-styled cues used as bumpers.

KWMT reports local news, weather and sports. It also provides extensive agriculture-related programming, with farm markets, and advertising from area auction barns throughout the day. During the spring planting and fall harvest seasons, the station's "Feed the Farmer" promotion offers farming families from the listening area an opportunity to be featured and have a catered meal provided to them by a local restaurant.

KWMT personality Dale Eichor has been with the station since 1972. A 60-plus year veteran in radio broadcasting, Eichor was full-time with the station until 2004, but has continued with the station on a part-time basis since retirement, primarily during the summer and fall months.

KWMT has maintained a significant commitment to agricultural news for over five decades. Long-time farm director Duane Murley celebrated 35 years at the station in 2020, having started his career there as a high school senior in 1985. He left the station in late 2024 to pursue other career opportunities.

Helena McNamee was chosen to take over as the Farm Director in 2025. She got her start in farm radio at KMZU in Carrollton, MO, in 2023. In her relatively short career, she has already garnered multiple awards from the National Association of Farm Broadcasting (NAFB), as well as the Missouri Broadcasters Association. She serves on the Young Professionals Committee in the NAFB as well.

The station is a charter member of the National Association of Farm Broadcasting and remains a primary source for market reports and regional farm news.

== History ==
The station officially signed on in April 1956 as KEOK. Shortly after its debut, the station was purchased by the owners of WMT in Cedar Rapids, who rebranded the station as KWMT to reflect the shared ownership.

During the late 1950s and early 1960s, KWMT operated with a Top 40 format and was home to several notable broadcasters, including legendary disc jockey Dr. Don Rose, who joined the staff in 1957, and Peter "Rabbit" McLane, who served as program director before moving to KIOA in Des Moines. It originally was a daytimer, required to go off the air at sunset to protect more powerful stations from interference. It later received nighttime authorization, using low power and a directional antenna. The station transitioned through a Middle-of-the-Road (MOR) format before adopting its long-standing Country and Agriculture identity in 1970.

The station was previously owned by Clear Channel Communications but was divested in 2007 to Three Eagles Communications as part of a larger market reorganization. Following a period of ownership by Alpha Media, the station was acquired by Connoisseur Media in September 2025.
