= Giuseppe Bianchi (architect) =

Italian architect

Giuseppe Bianchi was an Italian architect who worked in the church of Saint John the Evangelist in Parma in 1749. This choir stalls were carved by Andrea Boschi.
