= Francesco Bianchi =

Francesco Bianchi may refer to:

- Francesco Bianchi (bishop) (1606–1644), Roman Catholic bishop
- Francesco Bianchi (composer) (1752–1810), Italian operatic composer
- Francesco Bianchi (painter) (1447–1510), Italian painter of the Renaissance
- Francesco Bianchi (medallist) (1842–1918), Italian medallist in the Vatican
- Francis Bianchi (1743–1815), Italian saint
- Francesco Bianchi (athlete) (1940–1977), Italian athlete
