= KUFX =

Radio station in Fort Dodge, Iowa

Coordinates: 42.479°N 94.203°W

- Fort Dodge, Iowa; United States
- Frequency: 92.1 MHz
- Branding: 92 Rock

Programming
- Format: Active rock

Ownership
- Owner: Alpha Media; (Alpha 3E Licensee LLC)
- Sister stations: KKEZ; KTLB; KIAQ; KVFD; KWMT; KXFT

History
- First air date: December 17, 1990
- Former call signs: KFTX-FM (1984–1988, CP); KFDC (1988–1990, CP); KUEL (1990–2009); KZLB (2009–2026)
- Call sign meaning: Parked from a 2026 call sign change in San Jose, California. See KBAY

Technical information
- Licensing authority: FCC
- Facility ID: 60859
- Class: A
- ERP: 6,000 watts
- HAAT: 98 meters (322 ft)

Links
- Public license information: Public file; LMS
- Webcast: Listen live
- Website: www.yourfortdodge.com

KUFX (92.1 FM, "92 Rock") is a radio station that broadcasts out of Fort Dodge, Iowa, airing an active rock format. The station is owned by Connoisseur Media, through licensee Alpha 3E Licensee LLC.

== History ==
KZLB began broadcasting in 1990 under the KUEL call sign (KOOL 92). It previously aired such formats as hot adult contemporary, active rock as "The Blaze" and classic rock as "The Eagle".

On October 3, 2019, KZLB changed their format from classic rock to active rock, branded as "92 Rock".
