= Bruno Bianchi =

Bruno Bianchi may refer to:

- Bruno Bianchi (sailor) (1904–1988), Italian sailor
- Bruno Bianchi (footballer) (born 1989), Argentine football defender
- Bruno Bianchi (cartoonist) (1955–2011), French creator of Inspector Gadget
- Bruno Bianchi (athlete) (born 1939), Italian former sprinter
- Bruno Bianchi (swimmer) (1943–1966), Italian swimmer
- Bruno Bianchi (racing driver), Canadian racing driver
