= Olga Bianchi =

Latin American pacifist and human rights activist

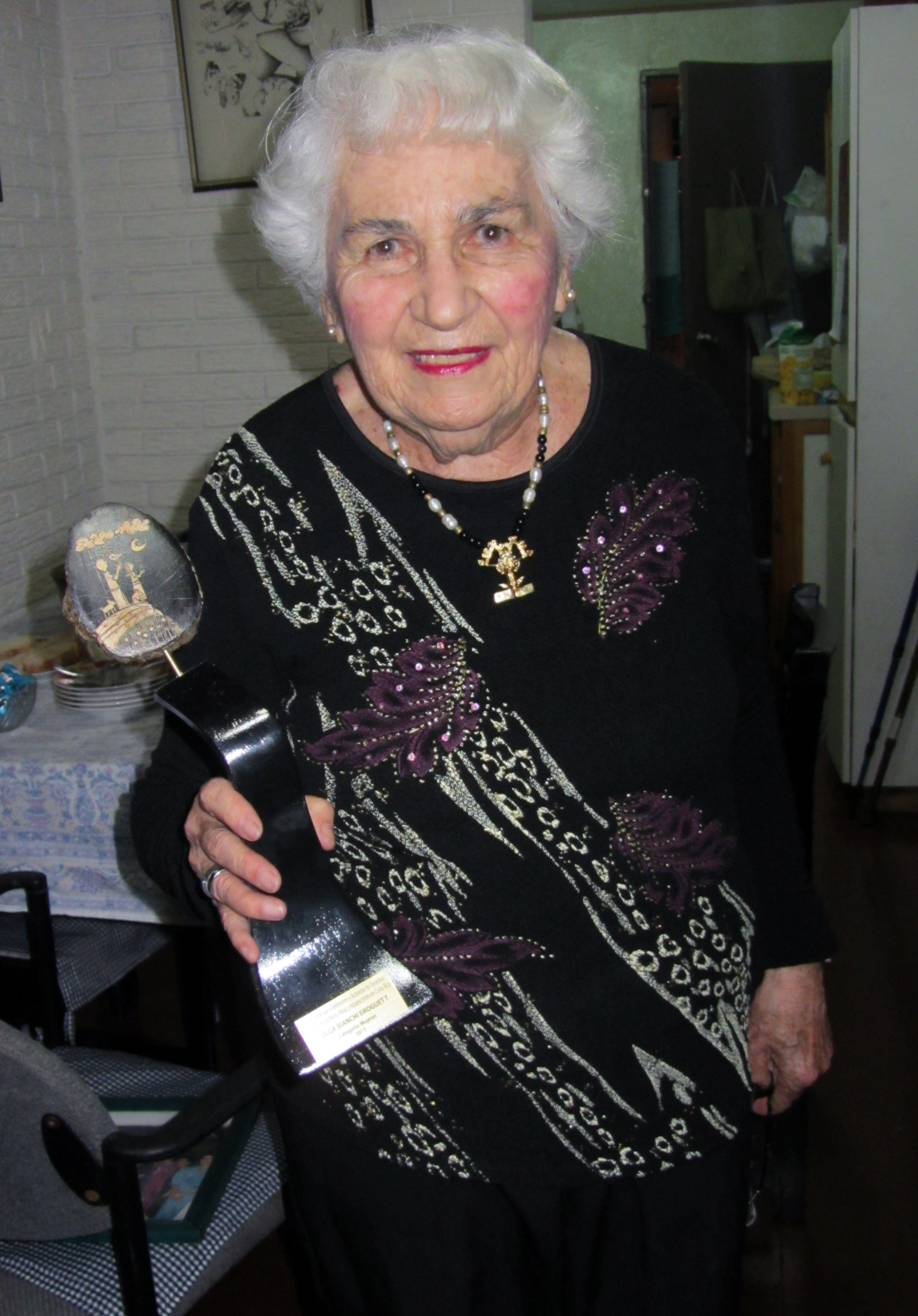
Olga Bianchi (2013)

Olga Bianchi Droguett (1924–2015) was an Argentine-born Chilean filmmaker, feminist, pacifist and women's rights activist. As a result of her resistance to Augusto Pinochet, she fled Chile in 1975 and settled with her children in Costa Rica. A convinced pacifist, in the early 1980s she joined Liga Internacional de las Mujeres Pro Paz y Libertad (LIMPAL), the Latin American branch of the Women's International League for Peace and Freedom (WILPF), becoming LIMPAL vice-president in 1986 and 1989. In addition, she served as LIMPAL's permanent representative to the United Nations in Geneva. Bianchi was also a board member of Amnesty International in Costa Rica and a founding member of the human rights organization CODEHU, the Costa Rican representation with the United Nations Commission on Human Rights.

== Early life ==
Born on 11 December 1924 in Salta, Argentina, where her father was serving as Chilean consul, Olga Bianchi was the daughter of Guillermo Bianchi and his Argentine wife Filomena Droguett Córdova. In 1946, she married the politician Raúl Fernández Longe with whom she had two children. The marriage was dissolved in 1949 and the father kept the children.

== Career ==
After the divorce, Bianchi took courses at the Centro Sperimentale di Cinematografia in Rome, Italy. On returning to Chile, she became a communist activist and married the university professor Gastón Carrillo, also a communist. Together they had two daughters (one of whom died when five), and two sons. From 1964, she worked in the international relations department of the University of Chile in Valparaíso.

Bianchi is remembered for her resistance against Augusto Pinochet who took power in 1973. In 1975, faced with political detention for distributing films on human rights and democracy, she was forced to leave Chile, soon settling in Costa Rica with her small children. There she joined the film department of the Ministry of Culture while also working as a translator and educator. Increasingly intent on supporting pacifism, in 1983 Bianchi first joined the Centro de Amigos para la Paz (CAP), a peace centre in San José newly established by the quakers. She then went on to become a member of the closely related Liga Internacional Por Paz y Libertad (LIMPAL), established in Costa Rica as the Latin American branch of the WILPF, serving as the organization's international vice-president in 1986 and 1989.

In addition, Bianchi served as LIMPAL's permanent representative to the United Nations in Geneva. She was also a board member of Amnesty International in Costa Rica and a founding member of the human rights organization CODEHU, the Costa Rican representation with the United Nations Commission on Human Rights.

Olga Bianchi died in Costa Rica on 30 August 2015.
