= KVFD (AM) =

Radio station in Fort Dodge, Iowa

Coordinates: 42°28′43.9″N 94°12′10.9″W

- Fort Dodge, Iowa; United States
- Broadcast area: Humboldt, Iowa; Webster City, Iowa
- Frequency: 1400 (kHz)
- Branding: KVFD AM 1400

Programming
- Format: Talk

Ownership
- Owner: Connoisseur Media; (Alpha 3E Licensee LLC)
- Sister stations: KIAQ; KKEZ; KTLB; KWMT; KXFT; KZLB

History
- First air date: December 24, 1939
- Call sign meaning: "The Voice of Fort Dodge"

Technical information
- Licensing authority: FCC
- Facility ID: 60862
- Class: C
- Power: 850 watts

Links
- Public license information: Public file; LMS
- Website: www.yourfortdodge.com/stations/1400-kvfd/

KVFD (1400 AM) is a radio station that broadcasts from Fort Dodge, Iowa. It airs a talk format. A local news and talk program is hosted by Mike Devine.

== History ==
KVFD first began broadcasting on December 24, 1939, and is recognized as the 16th oldest continuously licensed radio station in Iowa. The station was founded by Edward Breen and Allen R. Loomis under the Northwest Broadcasting Company, and it originally operated with the slogan "The Voice of Fort Dodge."

In 1971, Northwest Broadcasting sold the station to Fort Dodge Broadcasting Inc. for $450,000, which shifted the programming to a middle-of-the-road (MOR) format. Ownership remained stable under the Breen family for decades, during which time the station also launched KVFD-TV (Channel 21), an NBC affiliate that operated until its tower was destroyed by a tornado in 1977.

The station was later acquired by Sorenson Broadcasting in 1988, and by the early 2000s, it became part of the Waitt Radio group. Today, KVFD is owned by Alpha Media (via Alpha 3E Licensee LLC) following its acquisition from Connoisseur Media.

KVFD is not to be confused with KFVD, a Los Angeles area station using a similar call sign from 1925 to 1955.
