= Achille Bianchi =

Italian sculptor (1837–?)

Achille Bianchi (16 February 1837 – ?) was an Italian sculptor.

== Biography ==
He was born in Milan to a father who was an artist, and pursued studies at the Brera Academy under Benedetto Cacciatori. He was awarded a stipend to study in Florence and Rome. He sent to the academy as essays The entry of Christ into Jerusalem from Florence, and from Rome, a larger than life statue of Carmagnola defends himself from the accusation of treason.

In 1880, he settled in Rome, and had on Via del Babbuino a studio, once owned by his friend Giovanni Lombardi. Here, Bianchi specialised in portraits for the cemeteries of Rome. He also is known for the following works: Susanna; Pia de' Tolomei; Rebecca; Nidia, the blind flower seller of Pompei from the novel of Edward Bulwer-Lytton; L'Armida from the work of Tasso; Ildegonda; Desdemona, awarded a first class medal at Porto and winning him a decoration of the Knights of Christ. He also made the monument to his mother, and the funeral monument for the Puricelli-Guerra Family at the cemetery of Milan. He sculpted the altar of the church of Santa Maria delle Grazie, Brescia based on a design by Tagliaferri. In the cemetery of Rome are two monuments for the brothers Lombardi, both sculptors. Among his masterworks are the statues of Kinzica de' Sismondi of Pisa and of Alpinolo.
