= Giuseppe Bianchi (musician) =

Italian musician

Giuseppe Bianchi was a musician and tenor who worked at the Jesuit Collegium Germanicum in Rome in the 17th century. He was a student of Carissimi.
