= Joe Bianchi =

Joe Bianchi (August 5, 1871 in Origgio, Italy – May 29, 1949) was a world-class spur maker who immigrated to Victoria, Texas in December 1885 and died in Victoria at the age of 77. Bianchi's particular style became known across Southwest Texas as the Victoria Shank or bottle-opener spur, terms which are still used today by collectors, some sixty years after production of these much sought-after custom, handmade spurs ceased.

Bianchi's father, Luigi (Louis), purchased a farm after arriving in Texas. The 1900 Census listed Louis and his youngest son as farmer. By contrast, Joe and his older brother Paul were listed as blacksmith by trade at the time of their arrival, no doubt due to some experience gained in Italy.

Bianchi worked in partnership with other blacksmith shops, including with brother Paul at Bianchi Brothers Blacksmith Shop in 1901. Sometime after his marriage to Mathilde Urban on February 22, 1905, Bianchi opened his own shop next to their home on South William Street. This shop became a popular place for family, friends, cowboys and cattlemen to meet and visit. One could purchase spurs, bits, and branding irons and have repairs made to carriages, farming implements and household items. Bianchi built park benches for the city square around 1920. As a testimony to the quality of his work, a number of these benches can still be seen in Victoria over 80 years later.

After the introduction of the automobile resulted in a switch among the population away from horse and buggy, Paul's work turned to the automobile while Joe continued to concentrate on the needs of the cowboys and cattlemen, in particular, the spurs, bits and branding irons needed for their work. In addition to the distinctive bottle-opener style, some spurs and bits made by the Bianchi brothers can also be identified by markings such as BIANCHI, HANDFORGED and VICTORIA, TEX.

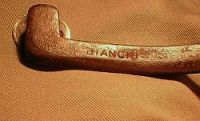

Bianchi offered to repair or replace any spur that proved defective without charge. He also created a pocket size catalog so his products could be ordered by mail. As a result, his products found a market throughout the United States and some foreign countries. He also placed advertisements in The Cattleman magazine as well as the Running W Saddle Shop catalog of the famous King Ranch in south Texas.

Joe was also known for his support of the church and various schools in town. He also joined the local Spanish American militia unit and was an active member of the Victoria Fire Department right up to the final years of his life. For his industriousness, civic mindedness and decent living, Joe was highly respected by all who knew and worked with him.

== Sources ==
- David C. Bianchi, My Italian Ancestors & Their Descendants, Cambridge Pub, 2004
