= Marius Bianchi =

French politician (1823–1904)

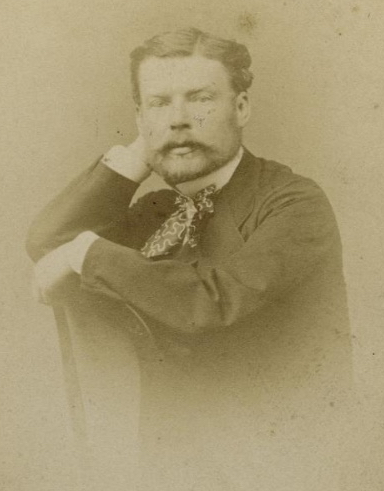
- Born: 7 July 1823; Saint-Tropez, Var, France
- Died: 14 August 1904 (aged 81); Maisons-Laffitte, Yvelines, France
- Occupation: Politician

Marius Bianchi (1823–1904) was a French politician. He served as a member of the Chamber of Deputies from 1876 to 1881, representing Orne.
