= Suzanne M. Bianchi =

American sociologist

Suzanne Bianchi
- Born: April 15, 1952; Fort Dodge, Iowa, US
- Died: November 4, 2013 (aged 61); Santa Monica, California, US
- Known for: Research on gender and family relationships and time
- Title: Dorothy L. Meier Chair in Social Equities
- Spouse: Mark Browning
- Children: 3

Academic background
- Education: University of Michigan; University of Notre Dame; Creighton University

Suzanne M. Bianchi (April 15, 1952, Fort Dodge, Iowa – November 4, 2013, Santa Monica, California) was an American sociologist. She was known for her work studying the evolving American family and gender roles.

== Personal life ==
Suzanne M. Bianchi was born in Fort Dodge, Iowa to Rita and Pesho Bianchi. Her mother was a housewife and her father was a meat packing plant employee. Bianchi was the oldest of six children. She and her husband, Mark Browning, had three children.

== Education and career ==
After graduating valedictorian from her high school, Bianchi was the first in her family to go to college and earned her B.A. in Sociology from Creighton University, her M.A. from University of Notre Dame, and her Ph.D. from the University of Michigan, Ann Arbor.

Bianchi began her career as a demographer for the U.S. Census Bureau, where she remained until 1994, rising to an assistant division chief position. In 1994, she joined the faculty at the University of Maryland, where she eventually chaired the university's sociology department and became the founding director of the Maryland Population Research Center. In 2000, she served as president of the Population Association of America.

In 2009, Bianchi moved to UCLA, where she was the first Dorothy L. Meier Chair in Social Equities. Among her main fields of study she focused on working mothers, researching and analyzing changes in American family life during the last decades.

== Death ==
In July 2013, Bianchi was diagnosed with pancreatic cancer. She died on November 4, 2013.

== Major contributions ==
Bianchi made many major contributions with her use of "time diaries." Her work encouraged the creation and use of the American Time Use Survey (ATUS) as well other international time use surveys.

Bianchi's academic work explored the shrinking gender gap and how women's careers affected households. Most of her studies focused on how parents, especially mothers, balance the demands of work and family. She researched women's employment, how husbands and wives divide housework and time with children, and how women take care of their children and parents.

Bianchi notably reported in her 2000 presidential address to the Population Association of America that 1990's working mothers spend similar amounts of time with their children as their 1960's stay-at-home counterparts, disproving the concept that maternal employment harms children.

She was also the co-author of seven books. One of her co-authors, Judith Selzer, said of her, "She always identified puzzles in the social world and tried to solve them by rigorous empirical studies." The book "Continuity and change in the American Family", co-written with Lynne Casper, was award-winning, as well as her book "Changing Rhythms of American Family Life" with Melissa Milkie and John P. Robinson.

== Sources ==
"List of books by Suzanne M. Bianchi". Archived from the original on March 4, 2016.
