= KLFG =

K-Love radio station in Fort Dodge, Iowa, United States

Coordinates: 42°40′18″N 94°09′12″W

- Fort Dodge, Iowa; United States
- Frequency: 89.5 MHz

Programming
- Format: Contemporary Christian
- Network: K-Love

Ownership
- Owner: Educational Media Foundation

History
- Former call signs: KEGR (2002–2013); KIFR (2013–2015)

Technical information
- Licensing authority: FCC
- Class: C3
- ERP: 17,000 watts
- HAAT: 111 m (364 ft)

Links
- Public license information: Public file; LMS

KLFG (89.5 FM) is a radio station that serves the Fort Dodge, Iowa area. The station broadcasts a Contemporary Christian music format airing Educational Media Foundation's K-Love network programming.

The transmitter and broadcast tower are located four miles north of Badger, Iowa along Hwy P52. According to the Antenna Structure Registration database, the tower is 183 m (600 ft) tall with the FM broadcast antenna mounted at the 113 m (371 ft) level. The calculated Height Above Average Terrain is 111 m (364 ft).

On May 29, 2015, Family Stations, Inc. filed an application to sell the then-KIFR, KEAF and four translators to Educational Media Foundation. KIFR would air EMF's K-Love network. Educational Media bought the six licenses for $553,750.

The station changed its call sign to the current KLFG on November 20, 2015, coincident with the consummation of the sale to EMF.
