= KVFD-TV =

Television station in Fort Dodge, Iowa (1953–1977)

- Fort Dodge, Iowa; United States
- Channels: Analog: 21 (UHF); later 50 (UHF)

Programming
- Affiliations: NBC (1953–1977)

Ownership
- Owner: Edward J. Breen; (Northwest Television Co.)

History
- First air date: November 23, 1953
- Last air date: May 4, 1977 (23 years, 162 days)
- Former call signs: KQTV (1953-1966)
- Former channel numbers: Analog: 21 (UHF, 1953–January 1977); 50 (UHF, January–May 1977)

KVFD-TV, UHF analog channel 21, was an NBC-affiliated television station licensed to Fort Dodge, Iowa, United States, which operated from November 23, 1953 to May 4, 1977.

== History ==
Edward J. Breen, a Fort Dodge attorney and former Democratic state legislator, owned KVFD radio and bought KQTV (channel 21) in 1953. It was an NBC affiliate, with local programming including the Barndance program, and Uncle Dick's Fun House with longtime KQTV/KVFD-TV announcer, weather and newscaster Dick Johnson. and Eve's Kitchen with Eve Rubenstein. Breen himself appeared on-air, with a couple of news/public affairs programs, Conference Table and Calling Ed Breen. He also served as a news anchor for the station.

Bob Shannon handled the noon and 10 p.m. nightly news, occasionally with Vince Fleming, who also focused on sports reporting. Shannon was also Hormel's Wilfred The Wiener Wolf mascot when portrayed on the Uncle Dick's Funhouse afternoon show. Bob Shannon was also the daytime news announcer for KVFD radio. Other locally produced shows were Saturday Night's Barn Dance, which was televised live from KQTV studios. It featured local country & western talent in a Grand Ole Opry-style format. The regular sponsor for this show was Schultz Brothers car sales from Algona, who would drive the "featured" car of the week to the studio early afternoon on Saturday, drive it into the studio and wax it down in preparation for the evening's live commercials. Another locally produced news segment called Telenews featured Jim Sween and provided viewers with upcoming TV show highlights.

KQTV had one very large General Electric black and white image orthicon TV camera. There were no zoom lenses, which meant the camera was "trucked" in and out for close ups or wide shots. It had a hydraulic pedestal and moved up or down by pressing on foot pedals. There was a smaller second camera available which was rarely used. The "news" department was a small desk off of the control room and consisted of two teletype machines that ran non-stop. Remote stories were shot on 8 mm film with no live sound and they were edited together on film-cutting film loops. The transmitter occupied the entire back of the building.

Throughout the station's history, it competed against Des Moines NBC affiliate WHO-TV. The station changed its callsign to KVFD-TV in 1966. It moved to channel 50 in early 1977 after selling its Bradgate, Iowa transmitter and tower to Iowa Public Television (IPTV). Viewership, and thus advertising revenues, for KVFD-TV had not increased as much as expected after building the 1,200-foot (370 m) Bradgate tower in 1970. This prompted the channel swap between KVFD-TV and IPTV's unbuilt KTIN, which was originally assigned to channel 46. KTIN took over the Bradgate tower and began operations on channel 21. KVFD-TV opted to return to its original 600-foot (180 m) Fort Dodge tower at the studio and moved to channel 50, as a used transmitter and antenna that was tuned to channel 50 was available.

After only a few months of operation on channel 50, the KVFD-TV studio and transmitter were struck by a tornado on the evening of May 4, 1977. Part of the roof was torn off of the KVFD-TV studio building; while still standing, the 600-foot tower suffered damage at the 200-foot (61 m) level. As it was no longer safe, the tower was razed later that month. Breen made plans to rebuild the transmission facilities, but he died in 1978 before any new construction began. The station's call sign was deleted by the FCC in 1981. The building previously used by KVFD-TV was later sold to Iowa Central Community College.

The KQTV callsign has been used by a TV station in St. Joseph, Missouri since 1969.

Fort Dodge does not have any other commercial TV stations, and receives commercial TV from Des Moines.
