= Emilio Bianchi =

Italian broadcast journalist

Emilio Bianchi (born 8 October 1957) is an Italian broadcast journalist. He was born in Rho, Lombardy.

== Career ==
His radio debut was on Radio Reporter on 22 June 1976, on the programme "Aperitivo Musicale" (Musical Aperitif). He later hosted The Buongiorno Reporter (later renamed The Emilio Bianchi Show) programme broadcast at 6 am.

When the TeleReporter station started broadcasting in 1977, Bianchi became one of their principal news reporters. In 1987, TeleReporter was transferred to Odeon TV, so Bianchi left television, but he continued his association with Radio Reporter. In 1988, he started to work with the TV groups Fininvest (now Mediaset) and 7 Gold, for whom he was a sports journalist for 11 years.

On 19 May 2006, he resigned from Radio Reporter and moved to Number One Radio, where he continued to lead a 3-hour-long programme, the "Emilio Bianchi Show", five days a week.

In December 2006 he left Italia 7 Gold and moved to Telelombardia and Antenna 3, where he is a sports commentator.
