= British commando frogmen =

Special Boat Service, whose members are drawn largely from the Royal Marines

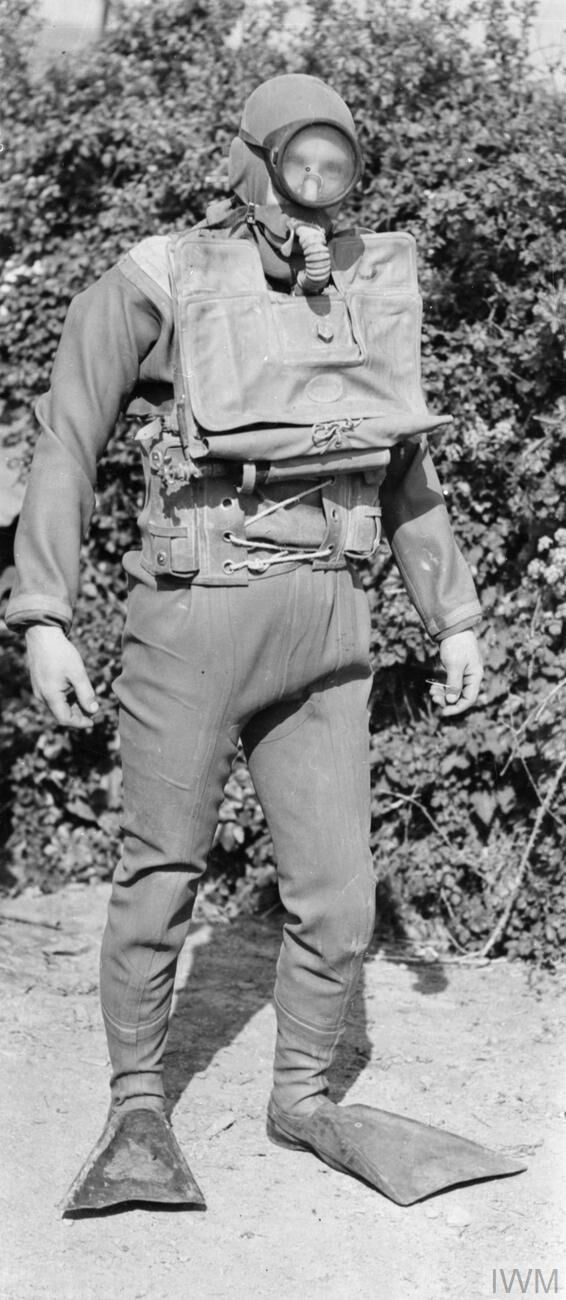
British, Royal Navy frogman in August 1945, here equipped with a Davis apparatus, a rebreather originally conceived in 1910 by Robert Davis as an emergency submarine escape set

Commando Frogman Force was a historical British amphibious special force unit, which is the predecessor of the current Special Boat Service (SBS). Its members were largely drawn from the Royal Marines. They perform various operations on land as well as in the water. Until the late 1990s, all members of the Special Air Service (SAS) Boat Troop were trained as commando frogmen.

== History ==
=== Before 1942 ===
In 1909 the British designer Commander Godfrey Herbert received a patent for a manned torpedo. During World War I, it was rejected by the War Office as impracticable and unsafe. Instead, in the inter-war period the Italian Navy successfully trained the special frogmen corps Decima Flottiglia MAS equipped with a new and powerful craft: a slow speed human torpedo (SLC: siluro a lenta corsa, best known as maiale). Italian manned torpedoes were first used against Britain in 1941 when Italian commando frogmen, some riding manned torpedoes, attacked British naval bases at Malta, Gibraltar and Alexandria. In the last operation six Italian frogmen rode three SLC's into the harbour and damaged the British battleships Queen Elizabeth and Valiant, and the tanker Sagona (the six frogmen were then captured). After these operations had shown how powerful and effective this weapon was the Royal Navy was convinced to create their own programme. This was also fictionalised in the 1958 film The Silent Enemy.

=== 1942 ===
- April: The British Navy formed the "Experimental Submarine Flotilla", initially based at Portsmouth. It was led by Commanders G.M. Sladen and W.R. "Tiny" Fell, who began to train frogmen in secret. The Navy called their manned torpedoes Chariots. Many of their frogmen's breathing sets' oxygen cylinders were German pilots' oxygen cylinders recovered from shot-down German Luftwaffe planes. Those first breathing sets may have been modified Davis Submarine Escape Sets; their full face diving masks were the type intended for the Siebe Gorman Salvus. But in later operations different designs were used, leading to a full face diving mask with one big face window. One version had a flip-up single window for both eyes to let the user get binoculars to his eyes when on the surface. They used bulky thick diving suits called Sladen suits.
- 1942 June: The Experimental Submarine Flotilla moved to "Port ZD" (Port D) at Keose on Loch Erisort in Scotland. Their first powered manned torpedo was the Mark I Chariot. Its hull was 21 in (53 cm) in diameter. It could make 2.9 kn (5.4 km/h) and could dive safely to a depth of 20 ft (6.1 m). The nose was a warhead with 600 pounds of high explosive. Training was hard. The men often suffered from oxygen poisoning because of the use of pure oxygen at depth, burst eardrums and sinus trouble. The strangeness of the Chariots added to their problems. They were trained to ride and steer for a long time under water, and to then cut through harbour defence nets. The hardest part was learning to work with the Chariots' warheads.
- August: The first group of trained British charioteers moved to Base HHZ on Loch Cairnbawn in Scotland to train in deeper waters - better matching the Norwegian Fiords, and to simulate attacking bigger better-defended places. One died in training.
- September: The Norwegian Navy officer Leif Larsen told the British Navy that he wanted to attack the German battleship Tirpitz in Asenfjord, a branch of Trondheim Fjord in Norway.
- Operation "Title":
  - 26 October: The fishing boat Arthur operated by three Norwegians left Britain with seven British frogmen and two chariots hidden aboard.
  - 28 October: Arthur reached Norway's coast near Edøya.
  - 30 October: Arthur unloaded the chariots and began to tow them to the target.
  - 31 October: A storm broke the fastening bolts of the chariots, which were lost. The attack was called off.
  - 1 November: The Arthur was scuttled at Breidvik. The ten members of the operation set off for Sweden in two groups. Nine reached Sweden; Germans captured one and later murdered him in accordance with the illegal Commando Order.
    - This operation was later portrayed in the 1955 war film, Above Us the Waves, featuring John Mills, which was based on Operation Title and the later Operation Source X-Craft midget submarine attacks on the Tirpitz.
- Late November: Britain sent 26 Chariots to Malta, and they became part of the "Tenth Submarine Flotilla". Three submarines received containers on their decks to carry the Chariots.
- Operation "Principle":
  - 28 November: The British submarine P-311 carrying 3 Chariots and 10 Charioteers left Marsamxett on Malta to attack La Maddalena on Sardinia, but struck a naval mine near Sardinia and sank with all hands.
  - 30 November: The British submarines Thunderbolt, Trooper and Unruffled (P46), left Malta carrying Chariots.
- After December 17: First known British frogman use of swimfins, rather than a Sladen suit and weighted boots riding a Chariot, was by British Clearance Divers.

=== 1943 ===
- Operation "Principal":
  - 3 January: The submarines HMS Thunderbolt and HMS P311 carrying two chariots each and HMS Trooper carrying three, with their respective crews, left to carry out this operation, the first by Britain involving the use of chariots. P311 was scheduled to attack targets at La Maddalena, while the other two submarines headed for the coast of Sicily near Palermo in a Force 5 wind.
  - One of the chariots which the Trooper carried was ridden by Sub-Lieutenant Rodney Dove and Leading Seaman Jimmy Freel. As it was launched, a big wave washed it over the submarine, causing the loss of its limpet mines and the gear to attach the warhead to a ship.
  - The chariots put mines on ships and patrol boats and sank some of them, but none of the mines exploded.
  - One chariot put its warhead on the Italian cruiser Ulpio Traiano (under construction), and afterwards smaller explosives on four ships. Ulpio Traiano sank.
  - Dove's chariot (Chariot XVI) put its warhead on the Italian troop ship Viminale (formerly a liner), by tying it to the sternpost with ropes, causing severe damage but not sinking it. While being towed from the harbour for repairs, it was torpedoed by a British submarine and damaged again. Later in the year, while en route for repairs for the second attack, it was sunk by American torpedo boats.
  - Because of bad weather two chariots did not reach the harbour.
  - All the chariots were lost; either scuttled, through equipment malfunction or human error. One charioteer died in the attack. The British submarine Unruffled recovered two others. Five had to land and were taken prisoner. Two of these prisoners later escaped from guards in Rome and hid in the Vatican until the Americans liberated Rome in 1944. Two others, involved in a quite separate operation (see below), escaped from guards in Libya. In the middle of Tripoli they found a British Army unit and were returned to England.
  - Dove ended up in a POW camp at Bremen in Germany, and got home in May 1945. He received the DSO. He died on 30 October 2005 aged 84.
- This left eight charioteers with two Chariots on Malta.
- 18 January-19: These two chariots were carried by submarines to attack ships that the Germans were going to use to block Tripoli harbour. The frogmen arrived too late and a blockship was sunk in the harbour mouth. None of the men or chariots returned to Malta.
- January: At Loch Corrie and Loch Cairnbawn in Scotland more charioteers were being trained.
- 16 April: Britain sent 14 new charioteers to Malta. In the days following they sent the new Chariot Mark II, also called the "Terry". Its riders sat back to back. It could manage 4.5 kn (8.3 km/h). The warhead was 1,100 lb (500 kg) of Torpex high explosive.
- June: During this month, the British submarine HMS Unseen (P51) carried three chariots from Malta to Sicily. The divers surveyed 100 mi (160 km) of coast, examining beaches to find dangers for armies who would be landing there later.
- 11 June: The other British charioteers went to Loch Cairnbawn.
- Late June: Britain sent six more charioteers to Malta, for an operation to attack Taranto.
- 25 June: Mussolini was replaced by Pietro Badoglio as the head of the Italian government. As a result, the attack on Taranto was called off, and the British frogmen were all sent to Scotland. After this, there was only one British chariot attack in the Mediterranean.
- July: At Loch Cairnbawn a charioteer died through an accident.
- 20 September: The British midget submarines known as X-craft set out to attack the German Tirpitz and the Scharnhorst in Kåfjord in Norway. The Scharnhorst was absent but the Tirpitz was damaged in the attack.
- 24 September: Britain sent 4 chariots and 12 charioteers from their Scottish base to Lunna Voe in Shetland to train for operations among the Norwegian islands.
- 14 October: A British torpedo boat carrying two chariots and four charioteers sailed from Lunna Voe to Tevik Bay in Norway and landed a man called Job to wait until a German ship came, but German aircraft found the torpedo boat and attacked. The torpedo boat had to flee to Britain badly damaged, and it landed at Dunbar in Scotland. Four days later another torpedo boat brought Job back to Shetland.
- October or November: A British torpedo boat carrying two chariots and four charioteers went from Lunna Voe to Nordfjord in Norway and landed a man to wait until a German ship came. In two days no German ship came, the boat went back to Shetland.
- 11 November: A British torpedo boat carrying two chariots and four charioteers sailed from Lunna Voe to Tevik Bay in Norway and landed a man to wait until a German ship came to Askvoll harbour. In two days no German ship came. It snowed, and they thought that Askvoll harbour would be blocked with ice. As the torpedo boat returned to Shetland it ditched the chariots because of bad weather, and it brought the charioteers back.
- 31 October: On this day or earlier British and American forces entered Naples.
- October or November: British frogmen went to Brindisi in Italy where they were combined with those Italian frogmen who were in the Allied-controlled areas and those Italian frogmen who had been prisoners in Britain, as a single organization.

=== 1944 ===
- 15 April: X-craft attacked the floating dock Laksevåg at Bergen in Norway but sank a cargo ship by mistake instead.
- May: 14 British charioteers were sent to Trincomalee in Sri Lanka.
- In the run up to the Normandy Landings British Chariots were used to survey the seabed along Normandy's coast in preparation for the troop landings.
- 2 June: After the Italians had left the Axis, the Italian destroyer Grecale sailed from Bastia in Corsica to La Spezia carrying three speedboats, and Italian frogmen including Luigi Durand de la Penne, and two British chariots, to attack the Italian cruisers Bolzano and Gorizia, which had been taken by the Germans after the Italian surrender. The Grecale launched the boats, which then carried the chariots and their charioteers and released them three miles from La Spezia harbour. One chariot began to leak from its float tank and had to be abandoned, but the others sank the Bolzano. This thwarted a German plan to sink the Bolzano and the Gorizia where they would block the harbour entrance. The charioteers did not manage to rendezvous with the motor boats but got ashore and met up with Italian partisans. In August one successfully crossed the Arno to reach the Allies, but the other three were captured trying to do the same.
- 6 June: Operation Overlord ("D-day"). British frogmen (not using Chariots) demolished many beach obstacles that Germans had set to stop an attacking army. One (Sub-lieutenant Hargreaves) drove an army tank onto land.
- 11 September: X-craft repeated their attack on the floating dock Laksevåg at Bergen in Norway and sank it.
- 27 October-28: The British submarine Trenchant carried two Mk 2 Chariots (nicknamed "Tiny" and "Slasher"). Crewed by Sidney Woollcott, Sub lieutenant Tony "Lofty" Eldridge (aboard Tiny), Petty Officer Smith, Able Seaman Brown (aboard Slasher) to an attack on Phuket harbour in Thailand. They were released 6 mi (9.7 km) out from the harbour. The targets were two Italian liners, the Sumatra (attacked by 'Tiny') and the Volpi (attacked by 'Slasher'), each of approximately 5,000 tons. Both ships were put out of action (their masts were visible in Phuket harbour above the water until the early 1970s when the wrecks were salved). Six hours later, for the only time, the British charioteers rode back to their mothership. On the return journey the Trenchant jettisoned the chariots so it could travel faster, after receiving a report of a Japanese MTB in the area. The Trenchant carried the four charioteers back to Trincomalee. There were no further chariot operations in combat.

=== 1945 and after ===
- 31 July 1945: Lieutenant Ian Edward Fraser and the diver James Joseph Magennis in the XE-craft XE3 attacked the Japanese warship Takao in the Johore Strait near Singapore and sank it. For this action, they received the Victoria Cross.
- The British Chariots were used in the immediate post war period to clear mines and wrecks in harbours.

By the end of the war, the British human torpedo operations had earned their participants 20 medals and 16 men had been killed.

Clearance Diving Teams were formed to clear unexploded ordnance and other military hazards left over from the war.

== See also ==
- Special Boat Service#History for a list of later SBS operations; not all involved frogmen
