= N91 =

N91 may refer to:

- HMS Trooper (N91), a submarine of the Royal Navy
- London Buses route N91
- Nebraska Highway 91, in the United States
- Nokia N91, a mobile phone
