= HMS Thetis (N25) =

Submarine

Coordinates: 38°15′0″N 13°15′0″E

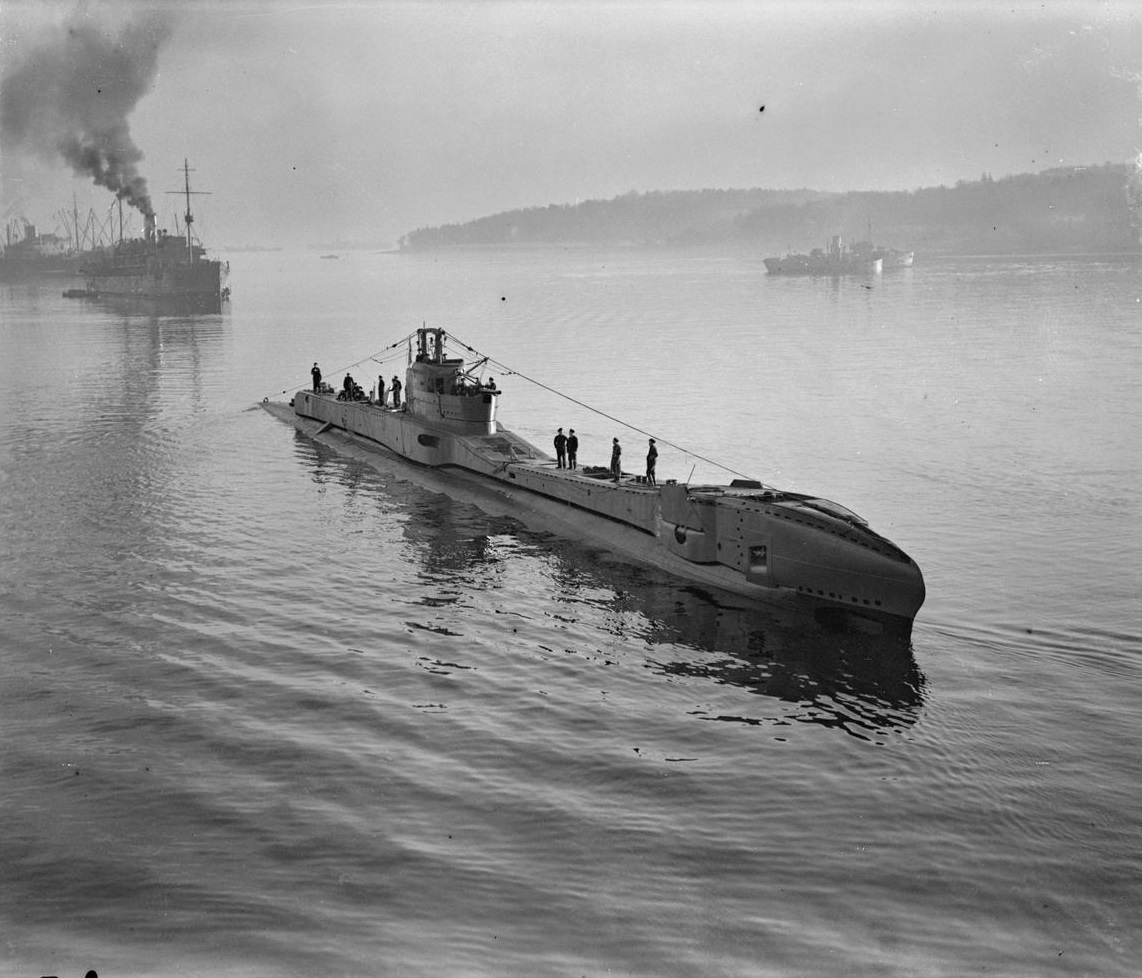
- HMS Thunderbolt returning from patrol during WWII

History

United Kingdom
- Name: HMS Thetis
- Builder: Cammell Laird, Birkenhead
- Laid down: 21 December 1936
- Launched: 29 June 1938
- Fate: Sank during trial dive 1 June 1939; Salvaged and repaired
- Badge
- Renamed: HMS Thunderbolt
- Commissioned: 26 October 1940
- Fate: Sunk 14 March 1943 in the Mediterranean Sea
- Badge

General characteristics
- Class & type: T-class submarine
- Displacement: 1,090 long tons (1,107 t) (surfaced); 1,560 long tons (1,585 t) (submerged)
- Length: 275 ft (84 m)
- Beam: 26 ft 6 in (8.08 m)
- Draught: 12 ft 9 in (3.89 m) forward; 14 ft 7 in (4.45 m) (aft)
- Installed power: 5,000 hp (3,700 kW) (diesel engines); 2,900 hp (2,200 kW) (electric motors)
- Propulsion: 2 × diesel engines; 2 × electric motors; 2 × shafts
- Speed: 15.25 knots (28.24 km/h; 17.55 mph) (surfaced); 9 knots (17 km/h; 10 mph) (submerged)
- Range: 4,500 nmi (8,300 km; 5,200 mi) at 11 kn (20 km/h; 13 mph)
- Test depth: 300 ft (91 m)
- Complement: 59
- Armament: 6 × internal, forward-facing 21-inch (533 mm) torpedo tubes; 4 × external, forward-facing torpedo tubes (6 reload torpedoes); 1 × 4-inch (102 mm) deck gun

HMS Thetis (N25) was a Group 1 T-class submarine of the Royal Navy which sank during sea trials in Liverpool Bay, England on 1 June 1939. After being salvaged and repaired, the boat was recommissioned as HMS Thunderbolt in 1940. It served during the Second World War until being lost with all hands in the Mediterranean on 14 March 1943.

The Thetis accident happened after the inner hatch on a torpedo tube was opened while the outer hatch to the sea was also open. Four men successfully used the aft escape chamber to reach the surface and be rescued but 99 men died in the incident. The sinking led to the redesign of all torpedo tubes on British and Australian submarines. A latch, known as the "Thetis clip", was added to the inner torpedo tube door limiting its initial opening; if water then flooded in the clip could be wound closed against the water pressure.

== As HMS Thetis ==
Thetis was built by Cammell Laird in Birkenhead, England and launched on 29 June 1938. After completion, trials were delayed because the forward hydroplanes jammed, but eventually started in Liverpool Bay under Lieutenant Commander Guy Bolus. Thetis left Birkenhead for Liverpool Bay to conduct her final diving trials, accompanied by the tug Grebe Cock. As well as her normal complement of 59 men she was carrying technical observers from Cammell Laird and other naval personnel, a total of 103 men. The first dive was attempted at about 14:00 on 1 June 1939. The submarine was too light to dive, so a survey of the water in the various tanks on board was made. One of the checks was whether the internal torpedo tubes were flooded.

Lieutenant Frederick Woods, the torpedo officer, opened the test cocks on the tubes. Unfortunately, the test cock on tube number 5 was blocked by some enamel paint so no water flowed out even though the bow cap was open. Prickers to clear the test cocks had been provided but they were not used. This combined with a confusing layout of the bow cap indicators — they were arranged in a vertical line with 5 at the bottom (2,1,4,3,6, and then 5) and the "Shut" position for tube 5 on the dial was the mirror image of tube 6 above it — led to the inner door of the tube being opened. The inrush of water filled the first compartment, and it was not possible to shut that compartment off completely, so a second one filled with water as well, causing the submarine to sink to the seabed 150 ft (46 m) below the surface. How the outer door (bow cap) to Tube 5 became open to the sea is unknown: Woods maintained that not more than 10 minutes before he opened the tube, all the indicators were at "Shut".

Later in the night, the crew attempted to reduce the submarine's weight. They could do nothing about the water which had flooded in, but, by pumping out drinking water and fuel, they managed to raise the stern so that about 18 feet of it then emerged above the surface of the water, enabling the destroyer to see the stern in daylight.

Earlier though an indicator buoy was released and smoke candle fired. By 16:00, Grebe Cock was becoming concerned for the safety of Thetis and radioed HMS Dolphin submarine base at Gosport. A search was immediately instigated. Although the stern remained on the surface, only three RN personnel (Lieutenant Frederick Woods, Captain Harry Oram and Leading Stoker Walter Arnold) and one Cammell Laird employee (Fitter Frank Shaw) escaped before the rest were overcome by carbon dioxide poisoning caused by the crowded conditions, the increased atmospheric pressure and a delay of 20 hours before the evacuation started. Ninety-nine lives were lost in the incident: 51 crew members, 26 Cammell Laird employees, eight other naval officers, seven Admiralty overseeing officers, four Vickers-Armstronsg employees, two caterers and a Mersey pilot. The crew waited before abandoning the vessel until she had been discovered by the destroyer Brazen, which had been sent to search for her and which indicated her presence by dropping small explosive charges into the water.

In order to effect an escape from the stricken vessel, the crew were required to enter the submarine's aft escape chamber, the forward chamber being at deeper than safe depth. Four men, three RN personnel (Lieutenant Woods, Captain Oram and Leading Stoker Arnold) and one Cammell Laird's employee (Fitter Shaw) successfully used the escape chamber. Woods and Oram first escaped, then a decision was made to attempt an escape with four men at once. This failed, possibly due to an inability to open the hatch in the cramped conditions, drowning three. There was one more double escape by Arnold and Shaw. Any further attempts were not successful, due to the escape hatch getting jammed.

The incident attracted legal action from one of the widows, who brought a claim of negligence against the shipbuilders, for not removing the material blocking the valve. The Admiralty successfully invoked Crown Privilege (now termed Public Interest Immunity) and blocked the disclosure of, amongst other items, 'the contract for the hull and machinery of Thetis as evidence in court, on the basis that to do so would be 'injurious to the public interest'. The case is one of interest in English law, as the judges in this case accepted the Admiralty's claim at face value with no scrutiny, a ruling later overturned.

Mersey Docks & Harbour Board salvage vessel Vigilant and the sunken Thetis's raised stern

The partly refloated Thetis, surrounded by rescue boats

The Liverpool & Glasgow Salvage Association was commissioned to salvage the sunken submarine. On completion of the salvage operation the bell from Thetis was presented to the Liverpool & Glasgow Salvage Association by the Admiralty. It is now at the Merseyside Maritime Museum, along with the plate from number five torpedo tube and the officers' wardroom clock.

One further fatality occurred during salvage operations, when one of the divers died from "the bends" on 23 August 1939. On 3 September, Thetis was intentionally grounded ashore at Traeth Bychan, Anglesey. It was the same day that war was declared. Human remains that had not already been removed by the salvage team were then brought out to a naval funeral, with full honours.

The loss went beyond that of a submarine's crew. Among the dead were two naval constructors and several of the submarine team from Cammell-Laird. These were experienced designers and builders of submarines who would have been needed during the war. Among the letters of condolence was one from Hitler.

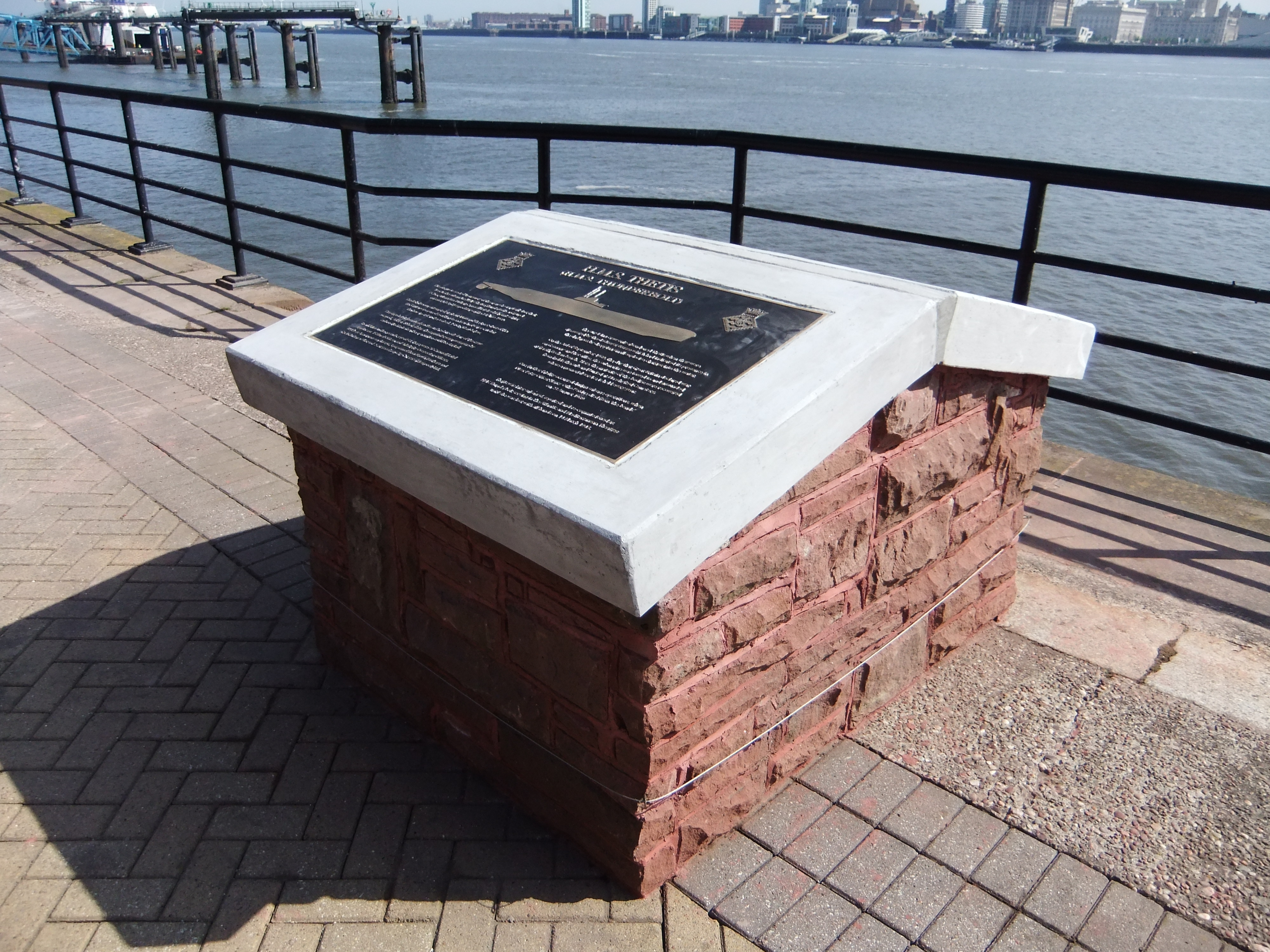
HMS Thetis memorial at Woodside, Birkenhead

The Thetis disaster was in marked contrast to the successful rescue of the survivors of USS Squalus, which had sunk off the coast of New Hampshire just a week previously. Squalus however, unlike Thetis, sank on an even keel, allowing a diving chamber to be used whereas the extreme angle of the Thetis made this impossible.

A memorial to the crew was unveiled at Maeshyfryd Cemetery, Holyhead on 7 November 1947. A second was unveiled on 1 June 2014, at the River Walkway, Woodside, Birkenhead.

== As HMS Thunderbolt ==
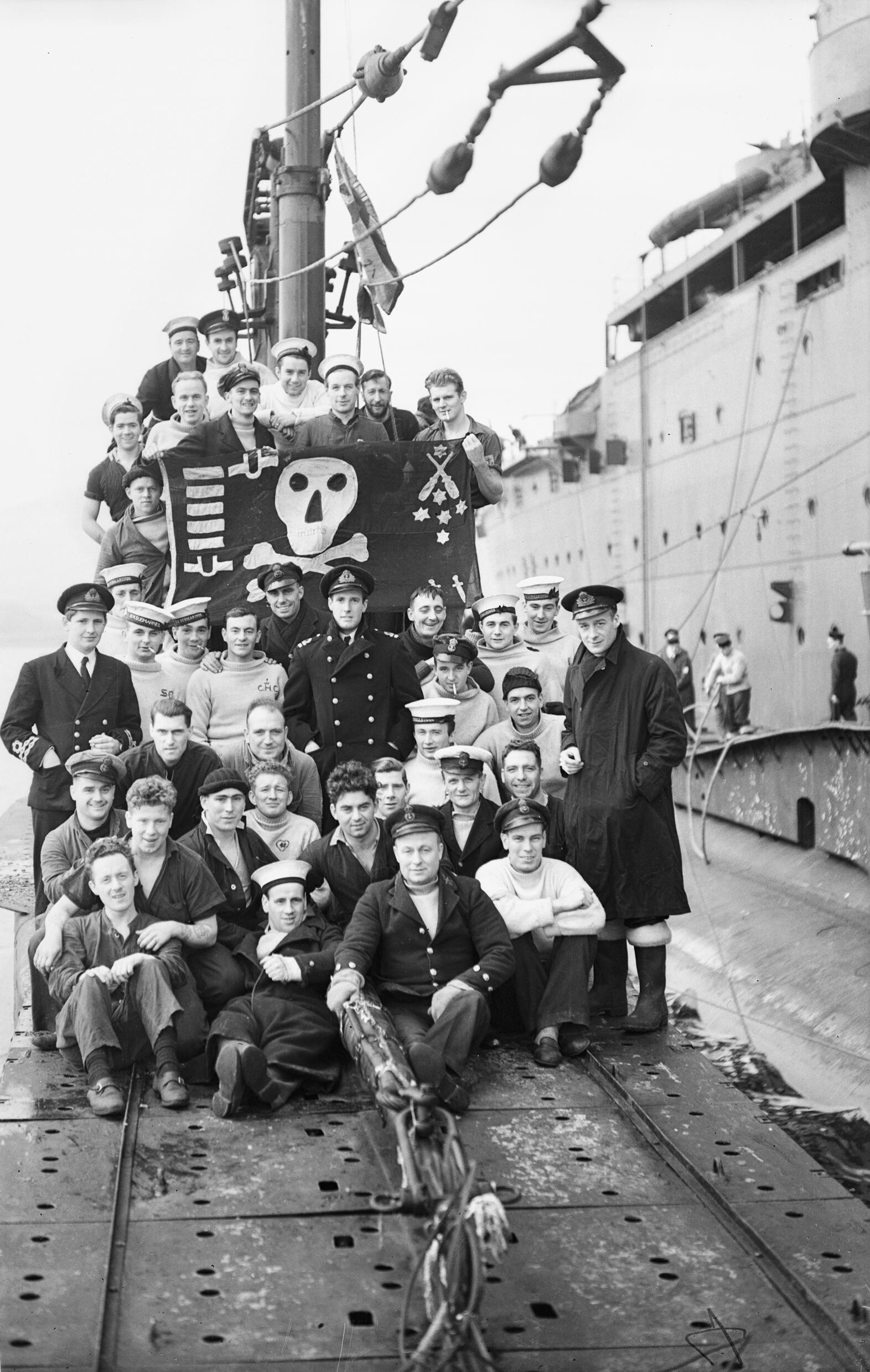
The crew of Thunderbolt and their 'Jolly Roger' flag, after a patrol in the Mediterranean

After being successfully salvaged and repaired, the submarine was commissioned in 1940 as HMS Thunderbolt under the command of Lt. Cdr. Cecil Crouch.

During the next 18 months, she saw service in the Atlantic Ocean. In December 1940, she was on patrol in the Bay of Biscay and, on 15 December, she encountered and sank the Italian submarine Capitano Tarantini.

In the autumn of 1942, Thunderbolt was converted with her sister ships Trooper and P311 to carry two "Chariots" (a type of manned torpedo) and their crews for operations against Axis shipping in harbour, and was transferred, with them, to the Mediterranean Sea in December 1942.

Their first mission, Operation Principal, was undertaken in December 1942, the three boats taking their charges to targets around the Mediterranean. Thunderbolt's objective was shipping in Cagliari, but the operation was not a success, and P311 was lost at La Maddalena, her intended target.

A second operation against Palermo Harbour in January 1943 was more successful. On 2–3 January, the manned torpedoes entered the Harbour and mined the ships there, sinking the hull of the incomplete light cruiser Ulpio Traiano and the freighter SS Viminale.

A further mission to Tripoli harbour took place on 18 January. This was to prevent the Axis using blockships to neutralise Tripoli Harbour, which was about to be occupied by the British Eighth Army.

On 20 February 1943, Thunderbolt shelled the Albanian sailboat Villanzen Veli off Bari. The British submarine was forced to dive and escape by the combined fire of the Italian auxiliary cruiser Brindisi and a coastal battery, while the sailboat only received light damage.

Thunderbolt was sunk on 14 March 1943 off Sicily by the Italian corvette Cicogna, which had detected her and attacked with depth charges. Thunderbolt sank in 1,350 m (4,430 ft) of water, with the loss of all hands.

== Appearance in the media ==
The 1950 film Morning Departure, directed by Roy Ward Baker, was based on a stage play of the same name by Kenneth Woollard that itself was based on the loss of HMS Thetis. The play was very popular at the time the film was made. Besides being presented on stage in several theatres in Britain, it had already been made as a live TV play by the BBC, first on 1 December 1946. The film starred John Mills and Richard Attenborough and was the feature film debut of Michael Caine. The actor James Hayter, who was a relative of one of the naval officers who died in HMS Thetis, Commander Reginald Hayter RN, plays the cook A/B Higgins in the film. It features the accidental sinking of a British submarine, HMS Trojan, when on exercise. The submarine detonates an unexploded mine from World War Two and sinks to the seabed after several compartments are flooded due to the explosion, killing the majority of the submarine's crew. Of the surviving crew in a watertight compartment, eight are able to escape through the gun hatch and conning tower using the only available breathing apparatus. The remaining crew wait for the submarine to be salvaged. This is eventually abandoned due to bad weather and they perish.

The cause of the loss of Thetis – flooding due to both inner and outer torpedo hatches being open to the sea – was used in the 1968 film Ice Station Zebra, where the character played by Patrick McGoohan describes a method of sabotaging a submarine by blocking the tube test cocks, fooling a torpedoman into believing the outer hatch was closed. How it got open in the movie without displaying on the appropriate indicator boards was avoided.

Alexander Fullerton's 1994 novel Not Thinking of Death centres around a fictionalised account of the sinking (with Thetis renamed to Trumpeter).

The loss of the Thetis was the inspiration for part of the "Railway station" episode (episode 2) of British science fiction television series Sapphire & Steel.

In 1997, BBC Radio 4 broadcast a radio play about the Thetis disaster. The play was called Close Enough To Touch and was written by Liverpool writer Fred Lawless. The play was also broadcast on BBC Radio Merseyside and the BBC World Service. In 1999, a play entitled HMS Thetis by Mark Gee in association with David Roberts, was performed at the Liverpool Bluecoat Chambers and at Birkenhead's Pacific Road Theatre. The play starred John McArdle and also the newly employed First Year Apprentices from Cammell Laird Shipyard (Paul Gillies, Dave Gill, Alan Lane, Chris Motley, Mike Jebb, Steve Taylor, Ollie Dodson, Stuie Dicken, Mark Poland, Ben McDonald, Tony Cummins, Barry Hayes, Chris Hall, Martin King, Graham Crilly, Billy Coburn, Matty Brassey).

In 2000 the documentary Death in the Bay, produced by BBC Northwest, was broadcast in the UK. It covered the loss of the vessel and the subsequent enquiry, together with interviews with relatives of two of the men lost in the tragedy and the son of a survivor, Leading Stoker Arnold.
