= Tony Eldridge =

Royal Navy officer

Anthony William Charles Eldridge DSC
- Nickname: Lofty
- Born: 16 July 1923; Royal Tunbridge Wells, United Kingdom
- Died: 13 April 2015 (aged 91)
- Allegiance: United Kingdom
- Branch: Army (1940–1942), Royal Navy (1942–1946)
- Service years: 1940–1946
- Rank: Sub-lieutenant
- Conflicts: Second World War
- Awards: Distinguished Service Cross
- Spouse: Dorothy Perkins
- Other work: Computing executive, police officer

Anthony "Lofty" William Charles Eldridge DSC (16 July 1923 – 13 April 2015) was a Royal Navy officer of the Second World War who led a human torpedo attack that sank two Japanese ships off Phuket, Thailand, for which he received the Distinguished Service Cross.

== Early life ==
Anthony William Charles Eldridge was born on 16 July 1923 in Royal Tunbridge Wells, and for his education he studied at The Skinners' School. While attending the school, Eldridge became a Senior King's Scout.

== Second World War ==
=== Home Guard ===
Eldridge served as a lance-corporal in the Home Guard before joining the Royal Navy in January 1942, when he was eighteen.

=== Royal Navy ===
Eldridge began his naval career in the Hunt-class destroyer HMS Cleveland, where he served on coastal convoys. From there he transferred to the shore establishment HMS King Alfred for officer training in September 1943. Eldridge volunteered for special service and was sent for dive training and then in April 1944 began learning to be a human torpedo using a Chariot manned torpedo.

==== Ceylon Secret Operation 51 ====
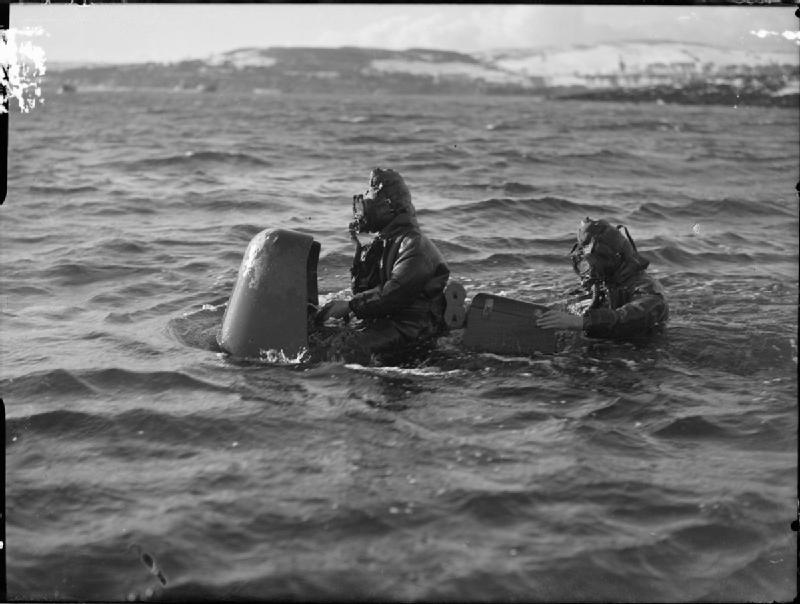
A chariot (sometime known as a human torpedo) craft underway at Rothesay being ridden by two men in full diving suits.

On 27 October 1944, Sub-lieutenant Eldrige and his number two petty officer, Sidney “Butch” Woollcott, boarded their Chariot named Tiny. They were accompanied on their mission by Petty Officer W. S. Smith and Ordinary Seaman Bert Brown aboard their chariot named Slasher. Their mission, Ceylon Secret Operation 51, was to attack Japanese shipping at Phuket Harbour in Thailand. Specifically, the targets were 5000 tonne Sumatra and the 5272 tonne Volpi.

Conveyed to Phuket by the submarine HMS Trenchant, they launched at 22:00 to pilot their Chariot the final six and a half miles to the target. They arrived at 00:30 but found that the barnacles on the ship prevented the use of magnets to secure their explosive warhead to the Sumatra. Therefore, they attached a clamp to the bilge keel and tied the warhead to the clamp with a rope. Eldridge and Woollcott set the timer for 6 hours, shook hands and began the journey back to Trenchant.

Their colleagues attacking the Volpi found that the ship was resting on the bottom of the harbour and therefore they could not attach their warhead underneath. Ordinary Seaman Brown boarded the Volpi and set his explosives in the engine room.

Arriving back at the submarine, the men were order to scuttle their chariots by Lieutenant-Commander “Baldy” Hezlet, who believed he had heard enemy propellers. Back aboard Trenchant, Hazlet with a cry of "There she goes!" called Eldridge to the periscope where he saw the second of the two target ships sink. Eldridge saw the force of the explosion sending debris to twice the height of the ship's mast.

The scuttled chariots were uncovered following the Boxing Day tsunami in 2004. However, another report has their discovery being made by divers. The position is recorded as being near Koh Dok Mai in the Andaman Sea.

Returning to Trincomalee in Ceylon, the men were cheered into the harbour as they stood on the casing of Trenchant. For his exploits Eldridge was awarded the Distinguished Service Cross, which was received through the post.

== Postwar ==
=== Salvage and mine clearance ===
At the end of the war, Eldridge was assigned to salvage and mine-clearance work before his demobilisation in 1946.

=== International Computers Limited ===
After his military service Eldridge briefly worked as a farmer before joining International Computers Limited. He emigrated to South Africa in 1954, where he continued his work for International Computers Limited installing information management systems.

=== Rhodesia ===
Moving to Rhodesia in 1960, Eldridge joined the British South African Police Reserve attached to the anti-terrorist unit. He served there for 18 years and was awarded the Meritorious Service Medal before moving back to South Africa after Rhodesian Independence.

=== South African Legion ===
Eldridge became prominent in the South African Legion, serving as a local chairman, provincial chairman and life vice president.

=== Return to Britain ===
In 2004 Eldrige returned to the United Kingdom, attending submariners' reunions and parades as well as supporting the British Legion. He became blind through suffering macular degeneration but enjoyed reading after being taught to use a computer by Blind Veterans UK. Eldridge attended the Cenotaph commemorations on Remembrance Sunday each year, of standing on parade he said -

Standing on parade, I think back to when I was a charioteer. I remember the bitter cold that went into my bones as most of our training as a submariner was done in the cold waters around the UK. Even to this day I tend to put more clothes on than other people as that memory of cold stays with me today. I also remember my friends I had trained and served with. God bless them all.

== Personal life ==
In 1950 Eldridge married Dorothy Perkins, with whom he had three daughters and a son.

== Memoirs ==
Eldridge wrote his autobiography in 1998 entitled, Just Out of Sight as well as recording an audio-history for the Imperial War Museum.
