= HMS Trespasser =

Submarine of the Royal Navy

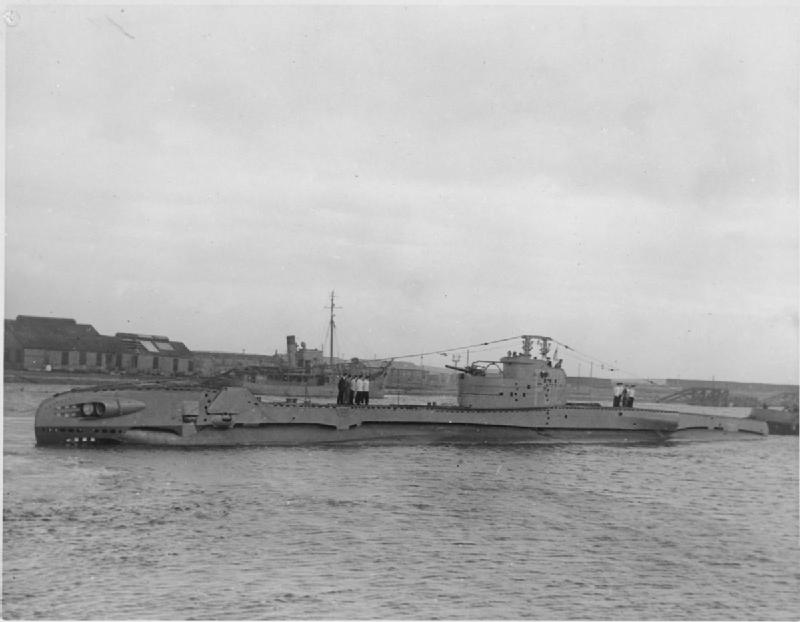
- HMS Trespasser in September 1942 at Barrow

History

United Kingdom
- Name: HMS Trespasser
- Builder: Vickers-Armstrongs, Barrow
- Laid down: 8 September 1941
- Launched: 29 May 1942
- Commissioned: 25 September 1942
- Fate: Scrapped in September 1961
- Badge

General characteristics
- Class & type: British T class submarine
- Displacement: 1,290 tons surfaced; 1,560 tons submerged
- Length: 276 ft 6 in (84.28 m)
- Beam: 25 ft 6 in (7.77 m)
- Draught: 12 ft 9 in (3.89 m) forward; 14 ft 7 in (4.45 m) aft
- Propulsion: Two shafts; Twin diesel engines 2,500 hp (1.86 MW) each; Twin electric motors 1,450 hp (1.08 MW) each
- Speed: 15.5 knots (28.7 km/h) surfaced; Nine knots (20 km/h) submerged
- Range: 4,500 nautical miles at 11 knots (8,330 km at 20 km/h) surfaced
- Test depth: 300 ft (91 m) max
- Complement: 61
- Armament: Six internal forward-facing 21-inch (533 mm) torpedo tubes; Two external forward-facing torpedo tubes; Two external amidships rear-facing torpedo tubes; One external rear-facing torpedo tubes; Six reload torpedoes; 1 x 4-inch (102 mm) deck gun

HMS Trespasser was a British submarine of the third group of the T class. She was built as P312 by Vickers-Armstrongs, Barrow, and launched on 29 May 1942. So far she has been the only ship of the Royal Navy to bear the name Trespasser.

She was one of only two T-class submarines completed without an Oerlikon 20 mm anti-aircraft gun, the other being HMS P311.

== Service ==
Trespasser served in a number of naval theatres, home waters, the Mediterranean and the Far East during her wartime career. While on patrol in the Gulf of Lyon, she fired three torpedoes at a dead whale, having mistaken it for an enemy submarine. She also attacked the German auxiliary patrol vessel Uj 6073 / Nimeth Allah, but failed to hit her. Her luck changed when she sank the Italian auxiliary patrol vessel V8 / Filippo with gunfire. Transferred to the Far East, she torpedoed and damaged the Japanese auxiliary gunboat Eifuku Maru off Burma.

She survived the war and continued in service with the Navy, finally being scrapped at Gateshead on 26 September 1961.

== Publications ==
- Colledge, J. J.; Warlow, Ben (2006) [1969]. Ships of the Royal Navy: The Complete Record of All Fighting Ships of the Royal Navy from the 15th Century to the Present (3rd Rev ed.). London: Chatham Publishing. ISBN 978-1-86176-281-8. OCLC 67375475.
- Hutchinson, Robert (2001). Jane's Submarines: War Beneath the Waves from 1776 to the Present Day. London: HarperCollins. ISBN 978-0-00-710558-8. OCLC 53783010.
