= Neger (torpedo) =

German naval craft during WWII

- A Neger with its operator being launched, c. 1944–45

Class overview
- Name: Neger
- Operators: Kriegsmarine
- In service: 1943–1945
- In commission: 1943
- Active: c. 200

General characteristics
- Displacement: 2.7 tonnes (2.7 long tons)
- Length: 7.60 m (24 ft 11 in) o/a
- Beam: 0.533 m (21 in)
- Installed power: 12 metric horsepower (8.8 kW; 12 shp)
- Propulsion: AEG-AV 76 Eto
- Speed: 3.2–4.2 knots (5.9–7.8 km/h; 3.7–4.8 mph) surfaced
- Range: 48 nautical miles (89 km) at 4 knots (7.4 km/h; 4.6 mph) surfaced
- Complement: 1
- Armament: 1 × 53.3 cm (21 in) torpedo

The Neger (German pronunciation: [ˈneːɡɐ], German for Negro) was a torpedo-carrying craft generally described as a human torpedo which could not submerge, but was difficult to see during night operations. The vessel was used by Nazi Germany's Kriegsmarine between 1943 and 1945. The name comes from its constructor, Richard Mohr, whose surname in German also means "Moor" or "Negro".

== Design ==
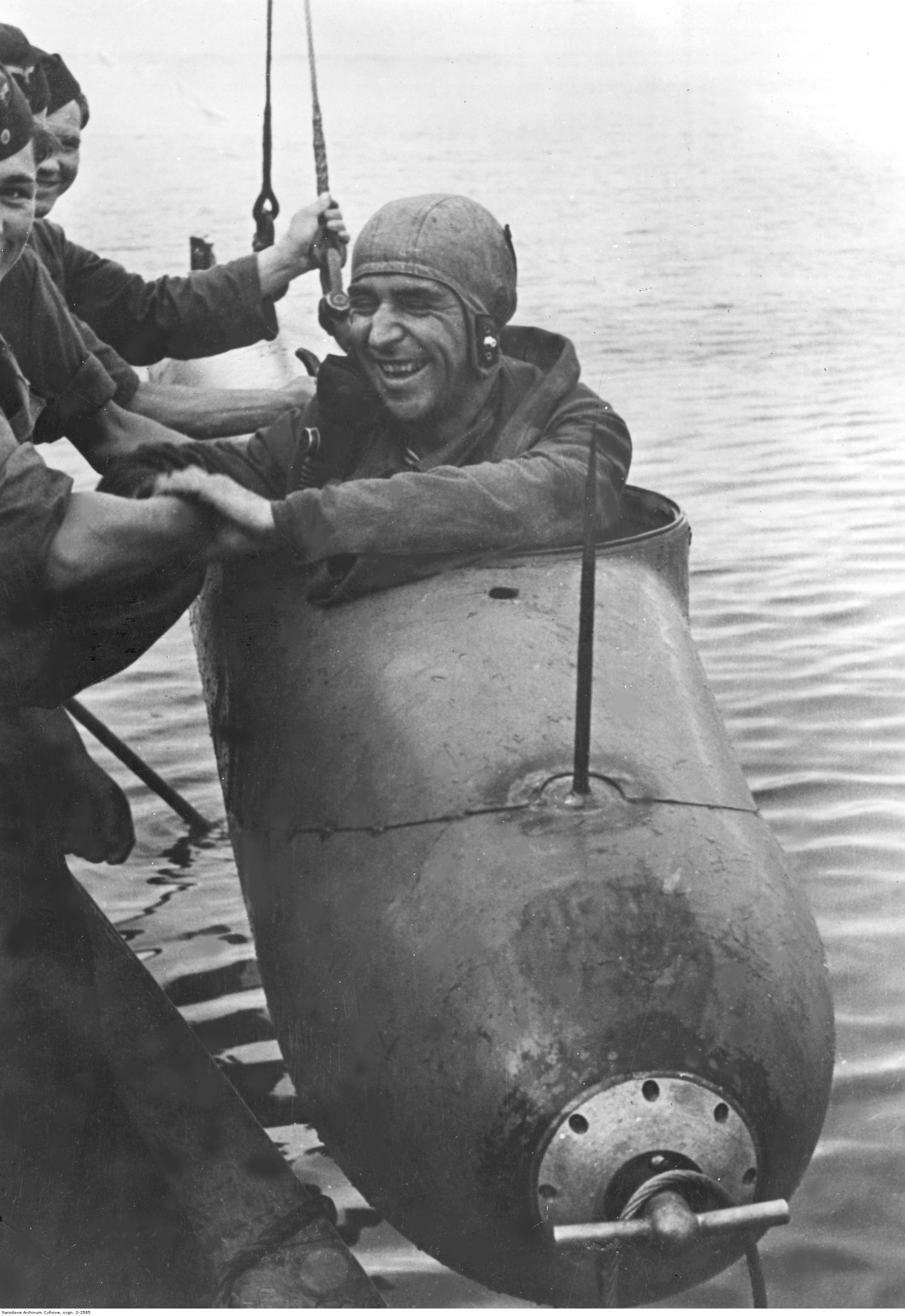
Walter Gerhold in the cockpit of a Neger

The Neger was based on the G7e torpedo and sported a spartan cockpit covered by a perspex dome, where the warhead would have been. It had sufficient positive buoyancy to run awash while supporting a second G7e, with warhead, slung below. The vessel had a range of 48 nautical miles (89 km) at 4 knots (7.4 km/h) and displaced 2.7 tons. The pilot navigated via a wrist compass and air was provided through a Dräger self-contained breathing device. The pilot aimed his weapon by lining up an aiming spike on the nose with a graduated scale on the dome. Subsequently, a second aiming spike was added closer to the dome. It, however, made little difference as water washing over the dome made visibility extremely poor. A simple lever in the cockpit irreversibly started the torpedo and released it. Though not designed as a suicide weapon, the Neger would frequently become one when the torpedo started running but failed to release, and carried the craft and its pilot toward the target.

About 200 vessels of this type were manufactured in 1944. The first Neger vessels entered service in March 1944. However, the Neger turned out to be very hazardous for its operator and up to 80 percent were killed. In return one cruiser, one destroyer, and three Catherine Class BAMS minesweepers were sunk in 1944 with the weapon.

The first mission took place on the night of 20/21 April 1944. Thirty Negers were launched against Allied ships berthed in Anzio. Only 17 of them managed to deploy, with the other 13 capsizing upon reaching the water. Three failed to return and up until then, the Allies had no knowledge of this new unusual weapon. None had made any successful attacks.

== Normandy attacks ==
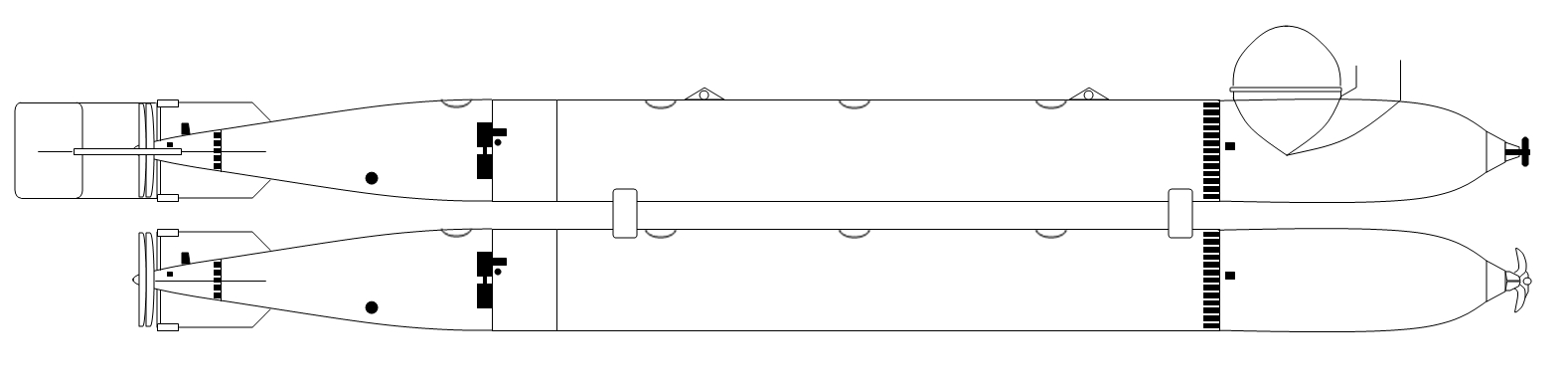
Diagram of a Neger

Two major assaults were carried out with Neger vessels against the Allied invasion fleet off Normandy before the Allies broke out from the landing site and forced the submarines to relocate out of reach of Normandy. The Neger flotilla consisted of some 40 vessels and operated from Favrol Woods near Honfleur on the south bank of the Seine opposite Le Havre. On 5/6 July 1944, 24 Negers attacked the invasion fleet, sinking two British minesweepers, HMS Magic and HMS Cato. Nine Negers returned from the mission.

The second attack was mounted on the night of July 7/8 and was carried out by 21 Negers. These were spotted in the moonlight and attacked by aircraft and ships. The Germans sank another minesweeper, HMS Pylades, and severely damaged the Polish cruiser Dragon, which was later scuttled. There is a detailed account of the attack on Dragon by the Neger pilot, Midshipman Potthast, who was captured several hours later. On 20 July 1944, the Royal Navy destroyer HMS Isis was mined while at anchor in the Seine Bay. The loss was discovered the next morning. There were 20 survivors. German human torpedoes were suspected of sinking the warship.

The Hunt class destroyer HMS Quorn was an escort for convoys of personnel during Operation Neptune, the naval support of Operation Overlord, the D-Day Landings. On 3 August, she was hit and sunk during a mass attack on the British assault area by a force of E-boats, explosive motorboats, human torpedoes and low-flying aircraft. Those on HMS Quorn that survived the initial attack spent up to eight hours in the water before being rescued and many of these perished; four officers and 126 seamen were lost.

== Later attacks ==
The Isles-class trawler HMS Colsay was sunk in shallow water by a Neger on 2 November 1944 near Ostend, Belgium.

== Remnants found in 2024 ==
On 30 October 2024, the remains of a Neger torpedo were uncovered on a beach in Calvados, Normandy, France.

== Bibliography ==
- Brown, David (1990). Warship Losses of World War Two. London: Arms and Armour. ISBN 978-0-85368-802-0.
- Prenatt, Jamie & Stille, Mark (2014). Axis Midget Submarines: 1939–45. Oxford, UK: Osprey Publishing. ISBN 978-1-4728-0122-7.
