= Human torpedo =

Early form of diver propulsion vehicle

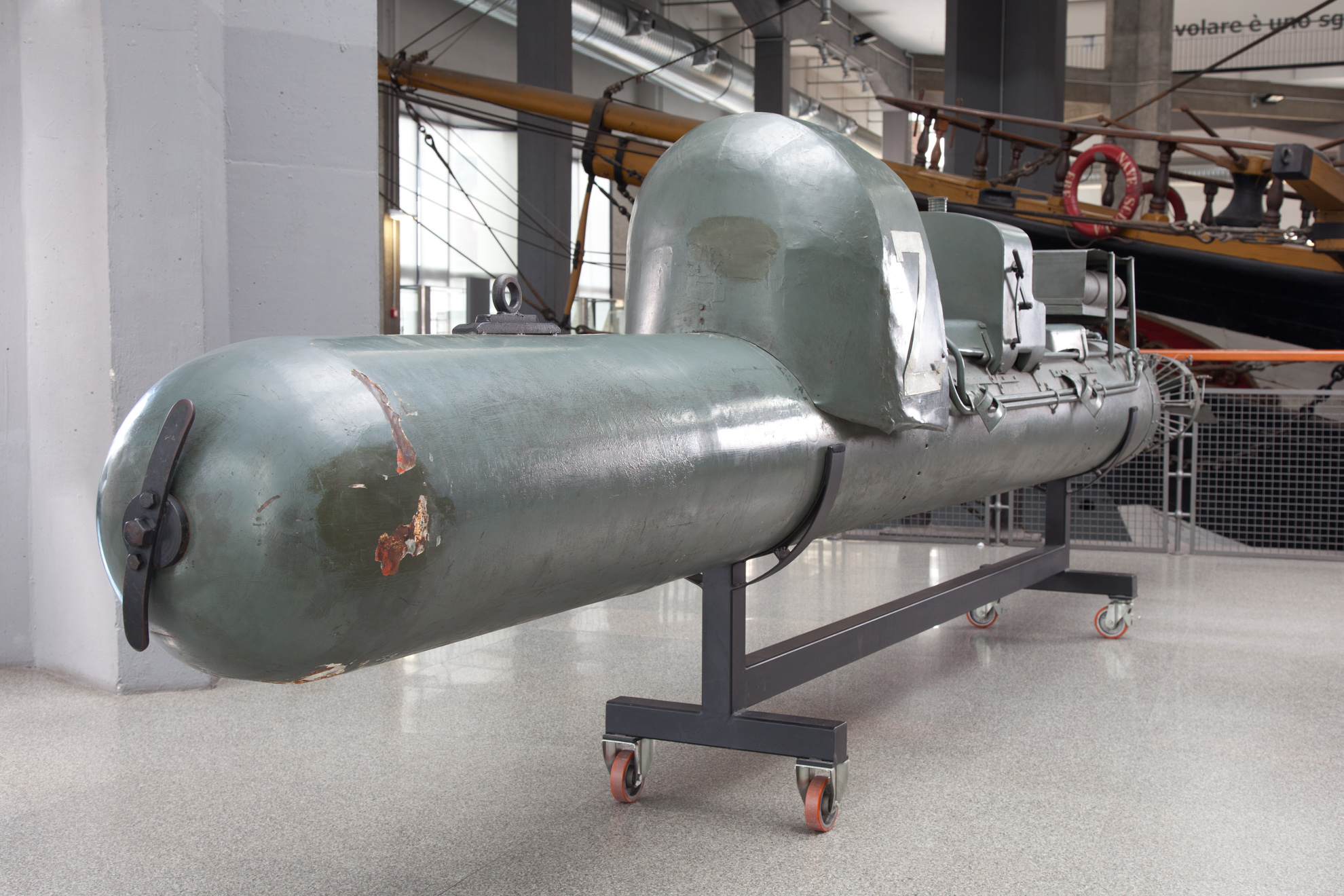
An Italian Siluro Lenta Corsa or maiale, at the Museo nazionale della scienza e della tecnologia Leonardo da Vinci, Milan

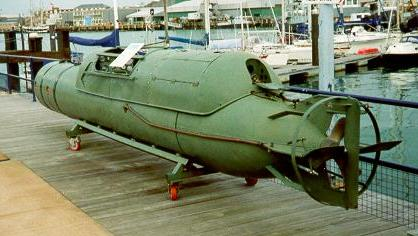
A maiale at the Royal Navy Submarine Museum, Gosport

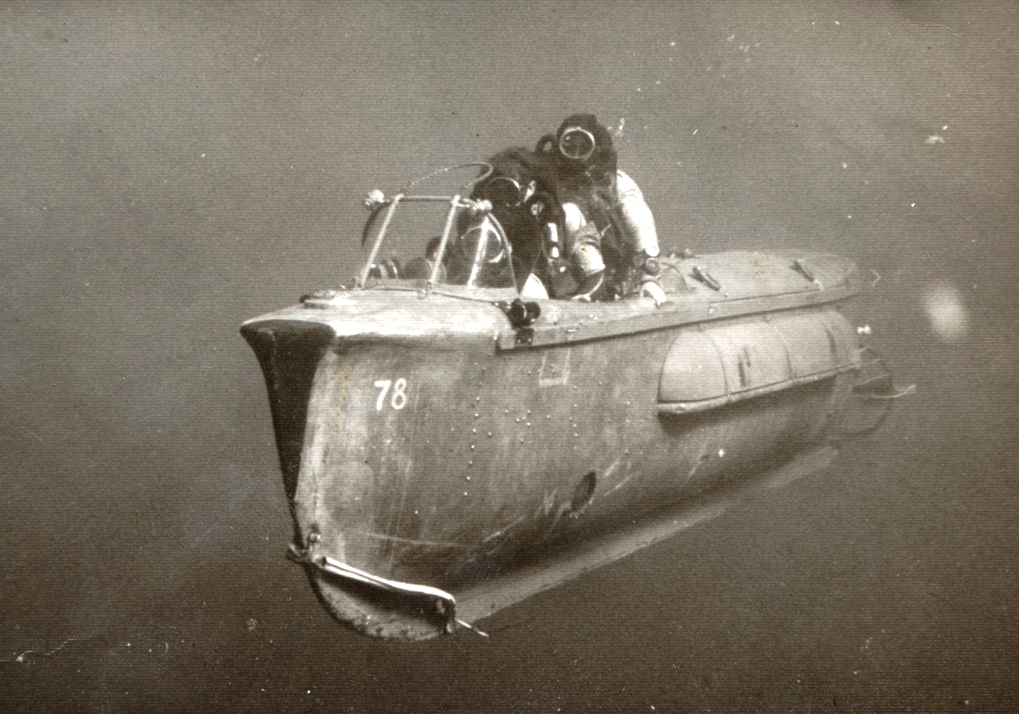
Israeli manned torpedo, 1967

Human torpedoes or manned torpedoes are a type of diver propulsion vehicle on which the diver rides, generally in a seated position behind a fairing. They have been used in naval warfare since World War I. The basic concept is still in use.

The name was commonly used to refer to the weapons that Italy, and later Britain (with a larger version), deployed in the Mediterranean and used to attack ships in enemy harbours. The human torpedo concept has occasionally been used by recreational divers, although this use is closer to midget submarines.

More broadly, the term human torpedo was used in the past to refer to vehicles which are now referred to as wet submarines and diver propulsion vehicles. Midget submarines, which are employed to directly support frogman operations, whether possessing airlocks or not, if used as underwater tugs to transport equipment and frogmen clinging to their exterior, also blur the line between the human torpedo and more sophisticated underwater vehicles.

== History of wartime models ==
The concept of a small manned submarine carrying a bomb was developed and patented by a British naval officer in 1909, but was never used during the First World War. The Italian Navy experimented with a primitive tiny sub (Mignatta) carrying two men and a limpet mine: this craft successfully sank the Austro-Hungarian battleship SMS Viribus Unitis on 1 November 1918.

The first truly practical human torpedo was the Italian maiale, electrically propelled by a 1.6 horsepower (1.2 kW) motor in most of the units manufactured. With a top speed of 3 knots (5.6 km/h), it often took up to two hours to reach its target. Two crewmen in diving suits rode astride, each equipped with an oxygen rebreather apparatus, and steered the craft to the enemy ship. The "pig" could be submerged to 15 metres (49 ft), and hypothetically to 30 metres (98 ft), when necessary. On arrival at the target, the detachable warhead was released for use as a limpet mine. If they were not detected, the operators then rode the mini sub away to safety.

Development began in 1935, but the first eleven were not completed until 1939 by San Bartolomeo Torpedo Workshops in La Spezia, Italy, and a larger number followed. The official Italian name for the majority of the craft that were manufactured was Siluro Lenta Corsa (SLC or "Slow-running torpedo"). Two distinct models were made, Series 100 and then (in 1942) Series 200 with some improvements. At least 50 SLCs were built by September 1943.

In operation, maiali were carried by another vessel (usually a conventional submarine), and launched near the target. Most manned torpedo operations were at night and during the new moon to cut down the risk of being seen. Attacks in 1940 were unsuccessful, but in 1941, the Italian navy successfully entered the harbour of Alexandria and damaged the two British battleships HMS Queen Elizabeth and HMS Valiant, as well as the tanker Sagona. This feat encouraged the British to develop their own torpedo "chariots".

The last Italian model, the SSB (for Siluro San Bartolomeo, "San Bartolomeo Torpedo") was built with a partly enclosed cockpit, a more powerful motor, and larger 300 kg (660 lb) warhead (up from the earlier SLC's 220 and 250 kg (490 and 550 lb) warheads). Three units were made but not operationally used, because Italy surrendered in 1943.

The first British version of the concept was named the Chariot manned torpedo. Two models were made: Mark I was 20 feet (6.1 m) long, while Mark II was 30 feet (9.1 m) long, each suitable for carrying two men. Later versions were larger, starting with the original X-class submarine, a midget submarine, 51 feet (16 m) long, no longer truly a human torpedo but similar in concept. The X-Class were capable of 6.5 knots (12.0 km/h) on the surface or 5.5 knots (10.2 km/h) submerged. They were designed to be towed to their intended area of operations by a full-size "mother" submarine.

The German navy also developed a manned torpedo by 1943, the Neger, intended for one man, with a top speed of 4 knots (7.4 km/h) and carrying one torpedo; the frequent technical problems often resulted in the deaths of operators. Roughly 200 of these were made, and they did manage to sink a few ships. The later Marder (pine marten in English) was about 27 feet (8.2 m) long and more sophisticated and could dive to depths of 27 metres (89 ft) but with very limited endurance. About 500 were built.

== Construction ==
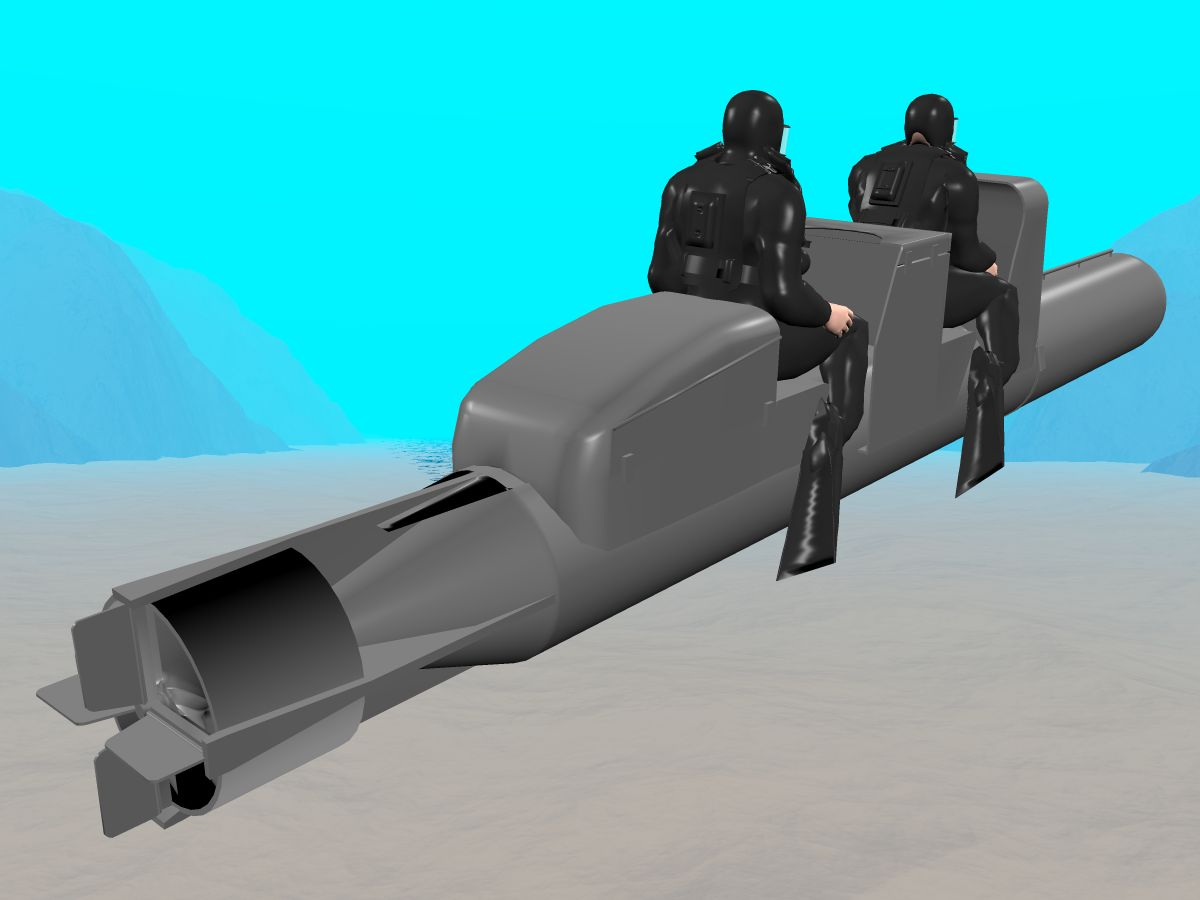
CGI image of human torpedo: British Mk 1 "chariot" ridden by two frogmen with UBA rebreathers

A typical manned torpedo has a propeller, hydroplanes, a vertical rudder and a control panel with controls for its front rider. It usually allows for two riders who sit facing forwards. It has navigation aids such as a compass and nowadays modern aids, such as sonar, GPS positioning, and modulated ultrasound communications gear. It may have an air (or other breathing gas) supply so its riders do not have to drain their own apparatus while they are onboard.

In some torpedoes, the riders' seats are enclosed; in others the seats are open at the sides as in sitting astride a horse. The seat design includes room for the riders' swimfins (if used). There are flotation tanks (typically four: left fore, right fore, left aft, right aft), which can be flooded or blown empty to adjust buoyancy and attitude.

== Timeline ==
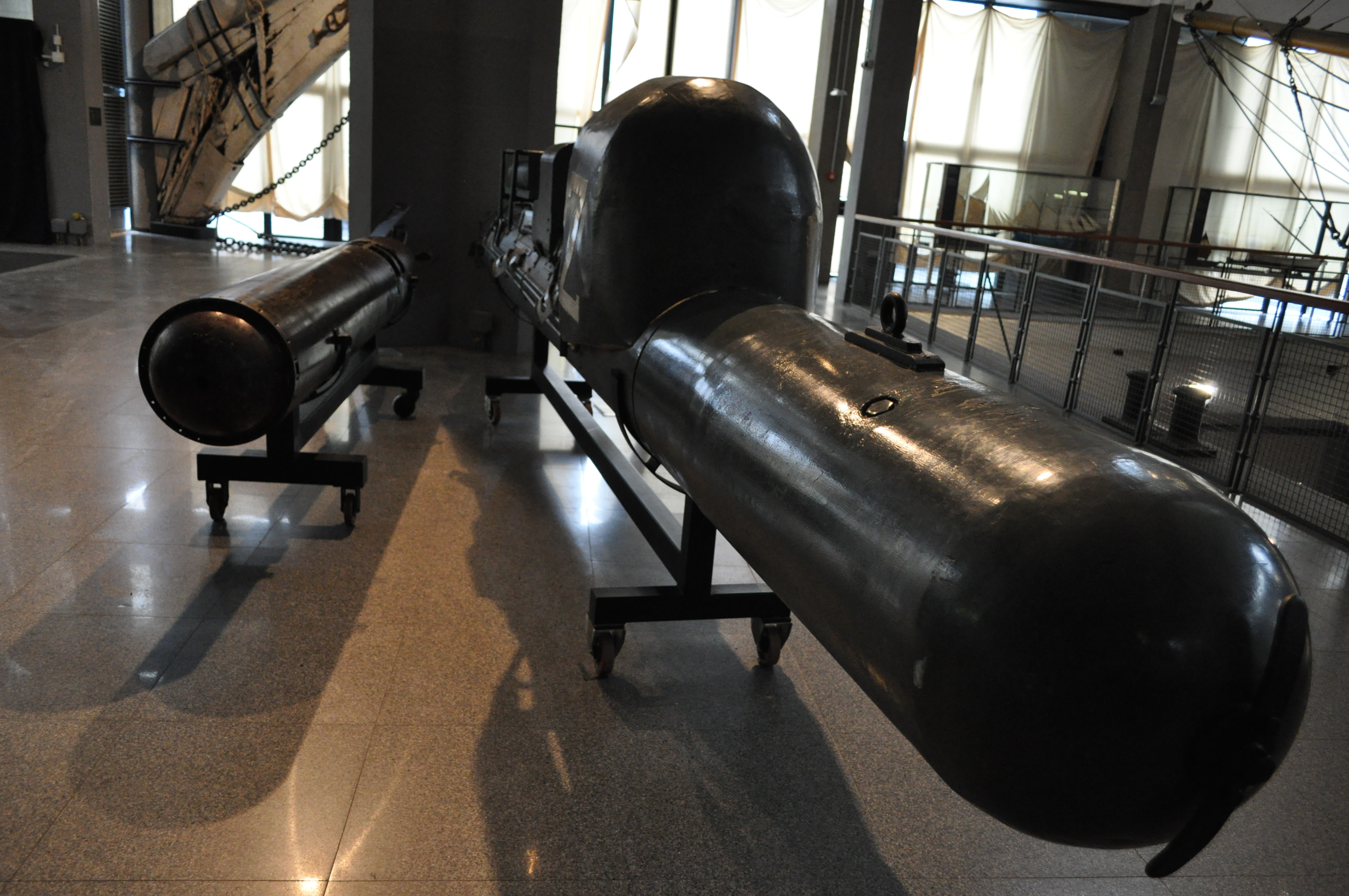
SLC displayed in the "Museo della Scienza e della Tecnica" in Milan

- 1909: The British designer Commander Godfrey Herbert received a patent for a manned torpedo. It was rejected by the War Office as impracticable and unsafe.
- 1 November 1918: Two men of the Regia Marina, Raffaele Paolucci and Raffaele Rossetti, in diving suits rode a primitive manned torpedo (nicknamed Mignatta or "leech") into the Austro-Hungarian Navy base at Pola (Istria), where they sank the Austrian battleship Viribus Unitis and the freighter Wien using limpet mines. They had no breathing sets so they had to keep their heads above water and thus were discovered and taken prisoner.
- 1938: In Italy the "1^{a} Flottiglia Mezzi d'Assalto" (First Fleet Assault Vehicles) was formed as a result of the research and development efforts of two men – Major Teseo Tesei and Major Elios Toschi of the Italian Royal Navy. The pair resurrected the idea of Paolucci and Rossetti.
- 1940: Commander Vittorio Moccagatta of the Italian Royal Navy reorganised the 1st Fleet Assault Vehicles into the Decima Flottiglia MAS (Tenth Light Flotilla of assault vehicles) or "X-MAS", under the command of Ernesto Forza. It secretly manufactured manned torpedoes and trained war frogmen, called nuotatori (Italian: "swimmers").
- 26 March 1941: The Raid on Souda Bay was an attack by the Decima MAS (X-MAS). Decima MAS used explosive boats (MTM) against British ships lying in Souda Bay, Crete, during the early hours of 26 March 1941. The MTM explosive boats had been ferried from Astypalaia by the destroyers Francesco Crispi and Quintino Sella and launched at the approaches to the bay. After crossing the three boom defences, the MTM attacked the British heavy cruiser HMS York and the Norwegian tanker Pericles (8,324 GRT).
- 26 July 1941: An attack on Valletta Harbour ended in disaster for the X-MAS and Major Teseo Tesei lost his life.
- 19 December 1941: The Decima Flottiglia MAS attacked the port of Alexandria with three maiali. The battleships HMS Valiant and Queen Elizabeth (and an 8,000-ton tanker) were sunk in shallow water, putting them out of action for many months. Luigi Durand de la Penne and five other swimmers were taken prisoner. De la Penne was awarded the Gold Medal of Military Valour after the war.
- October 1942: Two British Chariot manned torpedoes were carried aboard the Shetland bus fishing-boat Arthur to attack the Tirpitz on Operation Title. They were swung overboard once in Norwegian waters, but both became detached from their tow hooks in a gale and the operation was a total failure.
- 8 December 1942: An attack by three manned torpedoes from the Olterra against British naval targets was thwarted in Gibraltar. Three divers were killed by depth charges when the British harbour defence "reacted furiously" to the attack. Among the dead were Lieutenant Licio Visintini, commander of the divers unit on board the Olterra, Petty Officer Giovanni Magro, and Sergeant Salvatore Leone, from Taormina, Sicily. Leone's body was never found. Sergeant Leone was awarded the Medaglia d'oro al Valor Militare, and a memorial was erected in the Community Gardens in Taormina on the 50th anniversary of the attack. The memorial includes a rebuilt maiale and a description of the events in three languages.
- 1–2 January 1943: British submarines Thunderbolt, Trooper and P311 took part in Operation Principal. P311 was lost en route to La Maddelena, but the other two boats had some success at Palermo, launching two and three Chariots respectively. The Ulpio Traiano was sunk and the stern torn off Viminale; however, the cost was high with one submarine and one chariot lost and all but two charioteers captured.
- 18 January 1943: Thunderbolt took two chariots to Tripoli for Operation Welcome. This was to prevent blockships being sunk at the harbour mouth, so denying access to the Allies. Again, partial success was achieved. This was the last operation in which chariots were carried in containers on British submarines, although some others followed with the chariots on deck without containers.
- 6 May & 10 June 1943: Italian maiali from the Olterra, now under the command of Lieutenant Ernesto Notari, sank six Allied merchant ships in Gibraltar, for a total of 42,000 tons.
- September 1943: Operation Source was an attempt to destroy warships including the Tirpitz using X-class midget subs. Of the five deployed, only two were successful. Tirpitz was badly damaged, crippled, and out of action until May 1944.
- 2 October 1943: A bigger Italian frogman-carrier, 10 metres (33 ft) long and carrying four frogmen, called Siluro San Bartolomeo, or SSB, was going to attack Gibraltar, but Italy surrendered and the attack was called off.
- 21 June 1944: A British-Italian joint operation was mounted against shipping in La Spezia harbour. The chariots were carried on board a Motor Torpedo Boat and the cruiser Bolzano was sunk.
- 6 July 1944: A German Neger-type vessel torpedoed the Royal Navy minesweepers HMS Magic and Cato.
- 8 July 1944: A German Neger-type torpedo manned by Lieutenant Potthast heavily damaged the Polish light cruiser ORP Dragon off the Normandy beaches.
- 20 July 1944: Royal Navy destroyer HMS Isis was mined at anchor in Seine Bay. A German human torpedo was believed to be responsible.
- 27–28 October 1944: The British submarine Trenchant carried two Mk 2 Chariots (nicknamed Tiny and Slasher) to an attack on Phuket harbour in Thailand. See British commando frogmen for more information about this attack. No manned torpedo operations in combat in any war are known with certainty after this date.
- 20 November 1944: The USS Mississinewa was sunk by a Japanese kaiten manned suicide torpedo.
- Immediate post-war period: The British Chariots were used to clear mines and wrecks in harbours.

For other events, see Operations of X Flottiglia MAS and British commando frogmen.

Some nations, including Italy, have continued to build and deploy manned torpedoes since 1945.

== Italy ==
=== World War I ===
In 1918, Raffaele Rossetti created a new weapon based on his idea of a torpedo manned by a person, to be linked to enemy vessels under water and explode under the ship hull. This weapon was called a mignatta (leech) and was the precursor of the maiali of World War II.

=== World War II ===
For information on Italian manned torpedo operations during World War II, see Decima Flottiglia MAS.

- Siluro a Lenta Corsa (Italian, Low-Speed Torpedo – SLC), also known as a maiale.
- Siluro San Bartolomeo (Italian, St. Bartholomew Torpedo, also called SSB). It was never used in action.

=== After 1945 ===
CE2F/X100 is a swimmer delivery vehicle made in Italy after 1945, with a range of 50 miles (80 km) and capacity of two riders. The Pakistan Navy has several of them. India and Argentina also have some. Recent upgrades included:

- control module with a GPS
- autopilot
- digitized on board electronics
- launcher for five LCAW mini-torpedoes (optional)
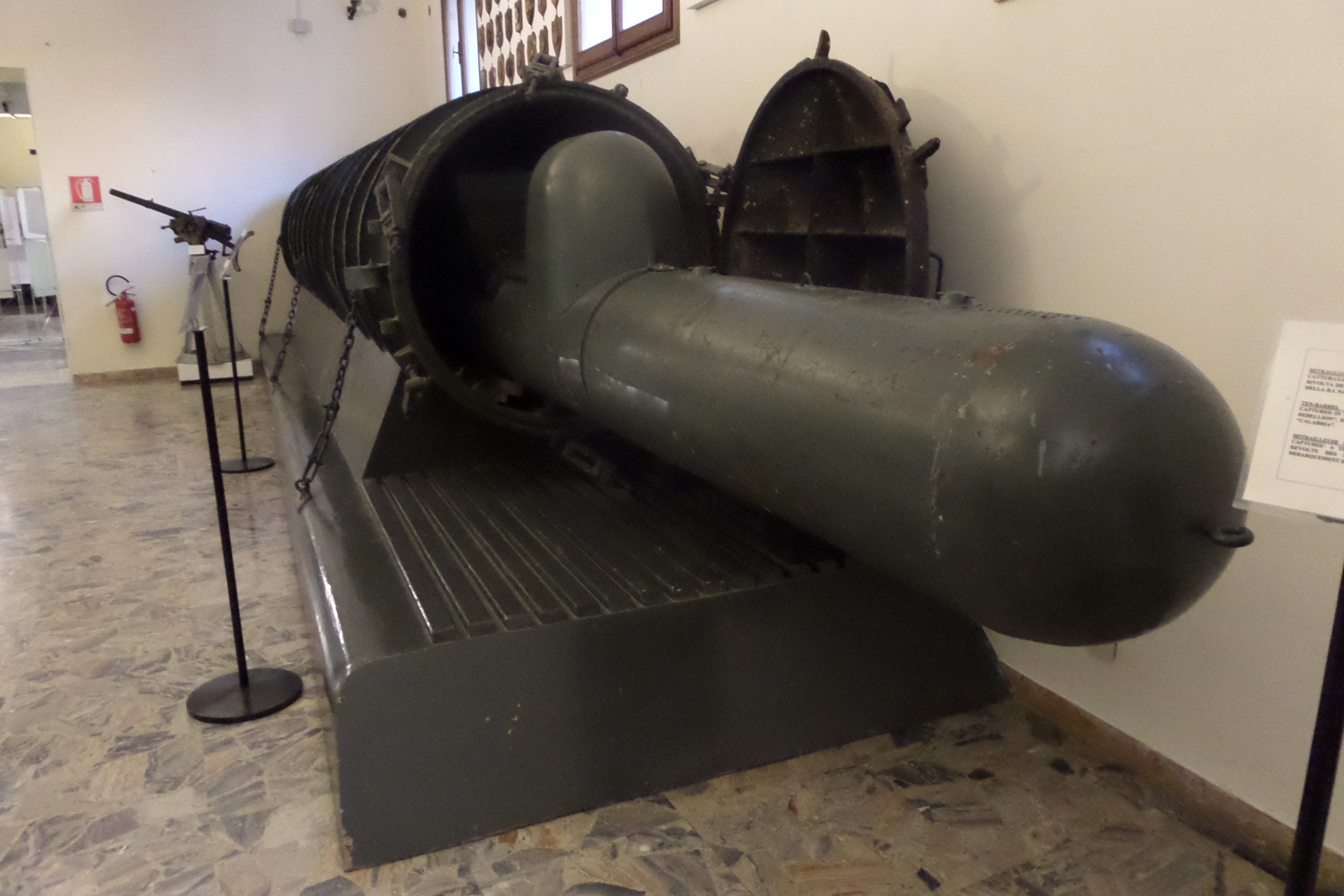
Waterproof container for a maiale, which could be attached to the deck of a submarine so that an attack could be made without being seen. In the Naval Museum (Museo storico navale), Venice.

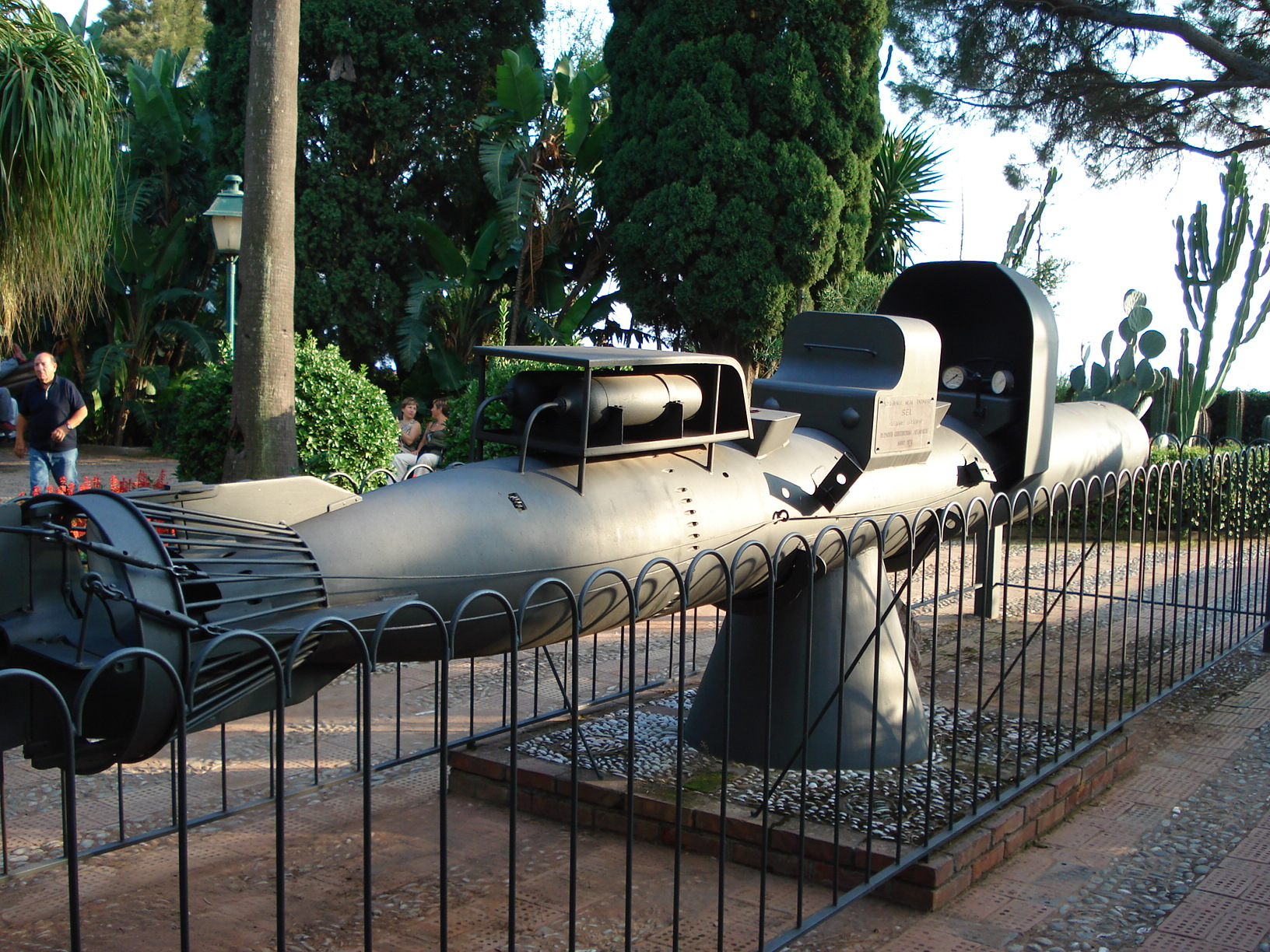
A maiale in Taormina, Sicily

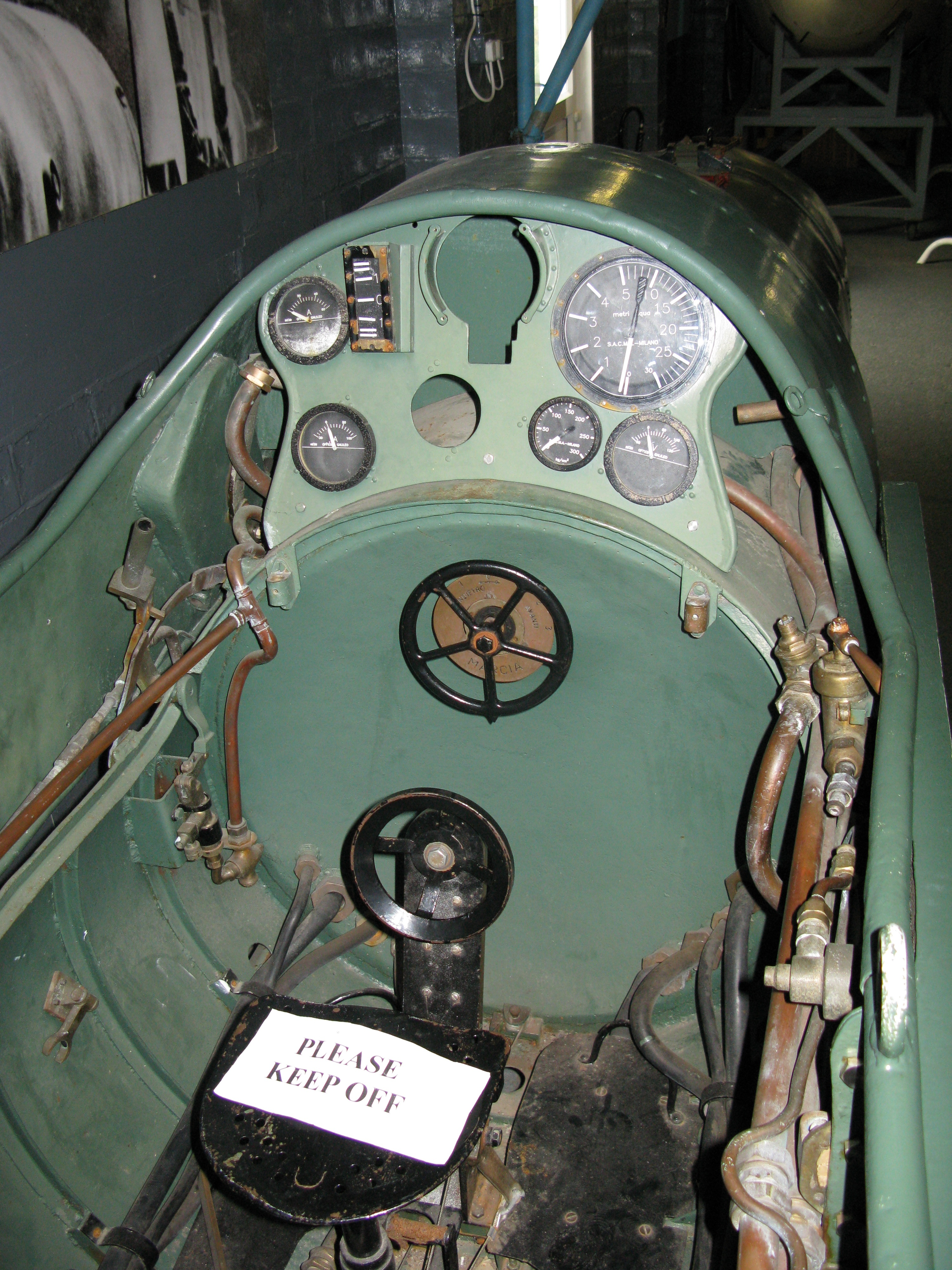
Cockpit of a maiale

== United Kingdom ==
=== World War II ===
- Chariot Mark I: 6.8 metres (22 ft) long, 0.9 metres (2 ft 11 in) wide, 1.2 metres (3 ft 11 in) high, speed 2.5 knots (4.6 km/h), weight: 1.6 tonnes, maximum diving depth: 27 metres (89 ft). Endurance five hours (distance depended on water current). Its control handle was in the shape of a sideways figure 8. Thirty-four examples were made.
- Chariot Mark II: 30 feet 6 inches (9.30 m) long, 2 feet 6 inches (0.76 m) diameter, 3 feet 3 inches (0.99 m) maximum height, weight 5,200 pounds (2,400 kg), maximum speed 4.5 knots (8.3 km/h; 5.2 mph), range 5–6 hours at full speed, had capacity for two riders who sat back to back. Thirty examples were made.
  - Both types of the Chariot were made by Stothert & Pitt at Bath, Somerset.
- Motorised Submersible Canoe (MSC): nicknamed Sleeping Beauty, a crewed wet submersible with a capacity of one frogman, used for clandestine operations, sabotage, and reconnaissance.
- X-class submarine: nicknamed X-Craft, a true midget submarine with both diesel and electric propulsion, possessing both a periscope and an airlock for frogman egress and entry. During Operation Source, a sortie of X-Craft was successful in sinking the Tirpitz in shallow water while the vessel was at anchorage behind anti-torpedo nets in Kåfjord. The attack did not destroy the vessel, which was raised and repaired.
- XE-class submarine: an improved and enlarged version of the X-class. The vehicles were used in the Pacific theatre, cutting underwater communication cables and also successfully sinking the Takao in Singapore harbour.
- Welman submarine: a midget submarine with a pressurized interior, meant to deploy magnetic limpet mines against the hulls of immobile vessels, and potentially also support frogman operations as a tug. The vehicle did not have a periscope and relied on the pilot's cupola emerging from below the water to orient itself against terrain and targets, as well as visually assessing its targets at short range under water. Despite over a hundred units constructed, they were used operationally only once and assessed as being unsuccessful.
- Welfreighter submarine: a true midget submarine intended to support frogman operations and serve as a clandestine agent transport, transporting both men and equipment. The vehicle's propulsion system used the same type of diesel engine as employed on the X-class.

=== After 1945 ===
- Archimedes DPV: nicknamed Archie, a modification of the Mark 20 Bidder ASW torpedo into a diver propulsion vehicle with deployable handlebars and an internal cargo compartment, which could function either autonomously or under direct control by a frogman.
- Subskimmer DPV: a hybrid of a motorized rigid inflatable boat while on the surface, and a battery electric submersible while under water. Frogmen can cling or hitch themselves onto the vehicle while it's under water, with the pilot seated in a kneeling position.
- Mark 8 SDV: a crewed wet submersible and swimmer delivery vehicle, originally in use by the United States Navy.
- Mark 11 SWCS: a crewed wet submersible and swimmer delivery vehicle.

== Germany ==
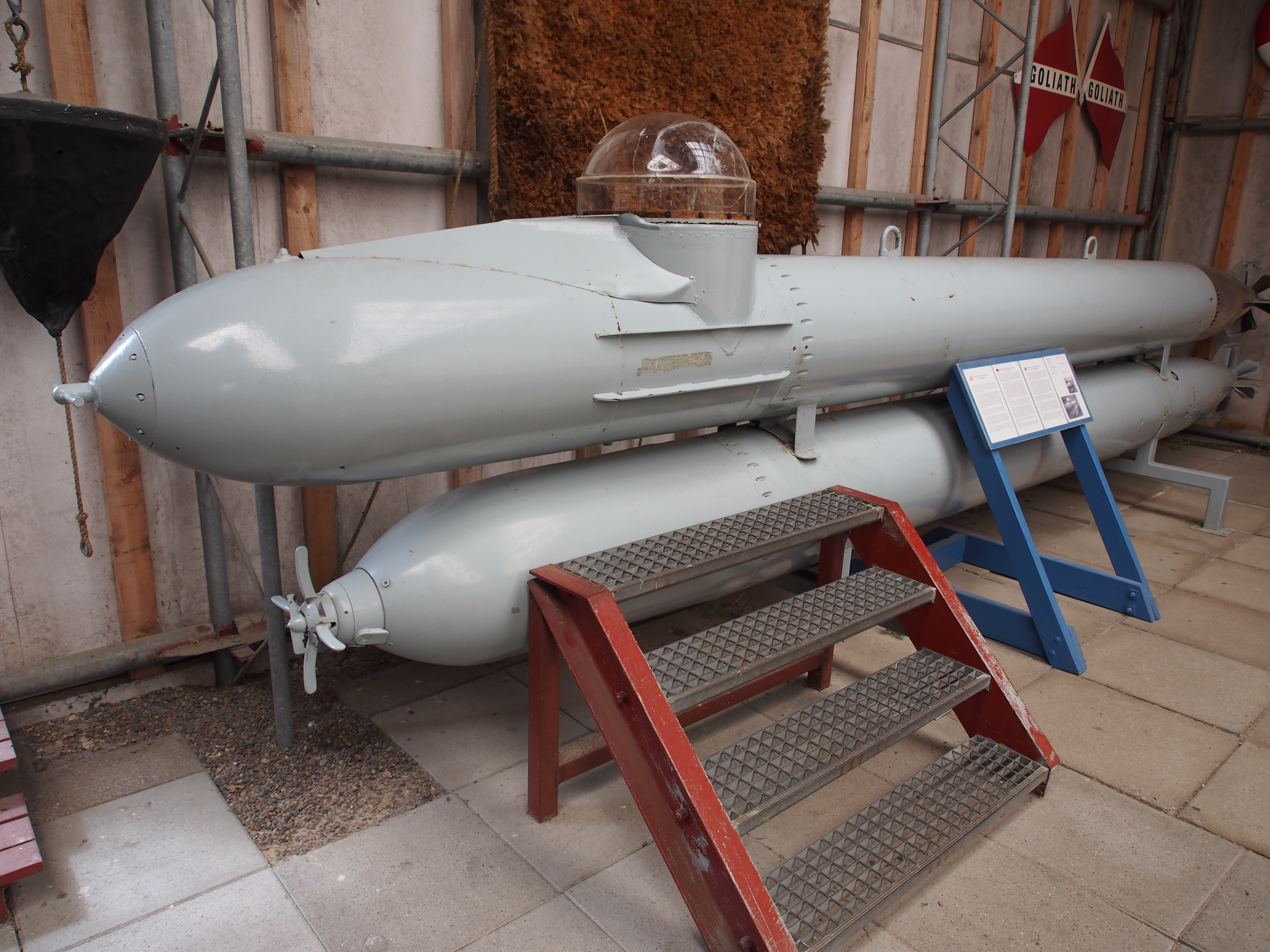
A Marder exhibited in Aalborg Søfarts- og Marinemuseum, Denmark. The depicted version has a standard dome cupola.

=== World War II ===
In July 1944, the Kriegsmarine introduced their human torpedoes to harass Allied positions at Normandy anchorages. Although they could not submerge, they were difficult to observe at night and inflicted several losses on Allied vessels. They were also used to harass Allied vessels in the invasion of southern France but were largely ineffective.

- Hecht: a midget submarine similar in design and application to the British Welman, constructed after studying the British X-Craft captured after the attack on the battleship Tirpitz. The Hecht had a complement of two crewmen and normally carried both a limpet mine on its nose section and a conventional torpedo slung beneath, on a slip rail mount. Propulsion was all-electric, using a standard electric torpedo motor, and the vehicle was designed to always be submerged; consequently, range was poor, with the vehicle intended to be towed to the vicinity of the target by a conventional submarine. Optionally, instead of a limpet mine, the Hecht could carry a third operative – a frogman equipped with a diving suit, riding astride the vehicle.
- Neger: a submersible constructed on the basis of a G7e torpedo with a second, normal G7e carried beneath it, launched from a slip rail mount. An extreme form of a genuine human torpedo which could function as both a swimmer delivery vehicle and an armed midget submarine. The Neger was 7.65 m (25.1 ft) long, with a body diameter of 53 cm (21 in). Total displacement, together with the payload, was approximately 5 tons. Top speed was 4.2 kn (7.8 km/h). The Neger was incapable of diving, set to a shallow depth; it relied on the extremely small profile of the pilot's cupola, which projected above the waterline, as well as the cover of night for stealth. The crew complement consisted of a single pilot. This manned torpedo was named after its inventor, Richard Mohr.

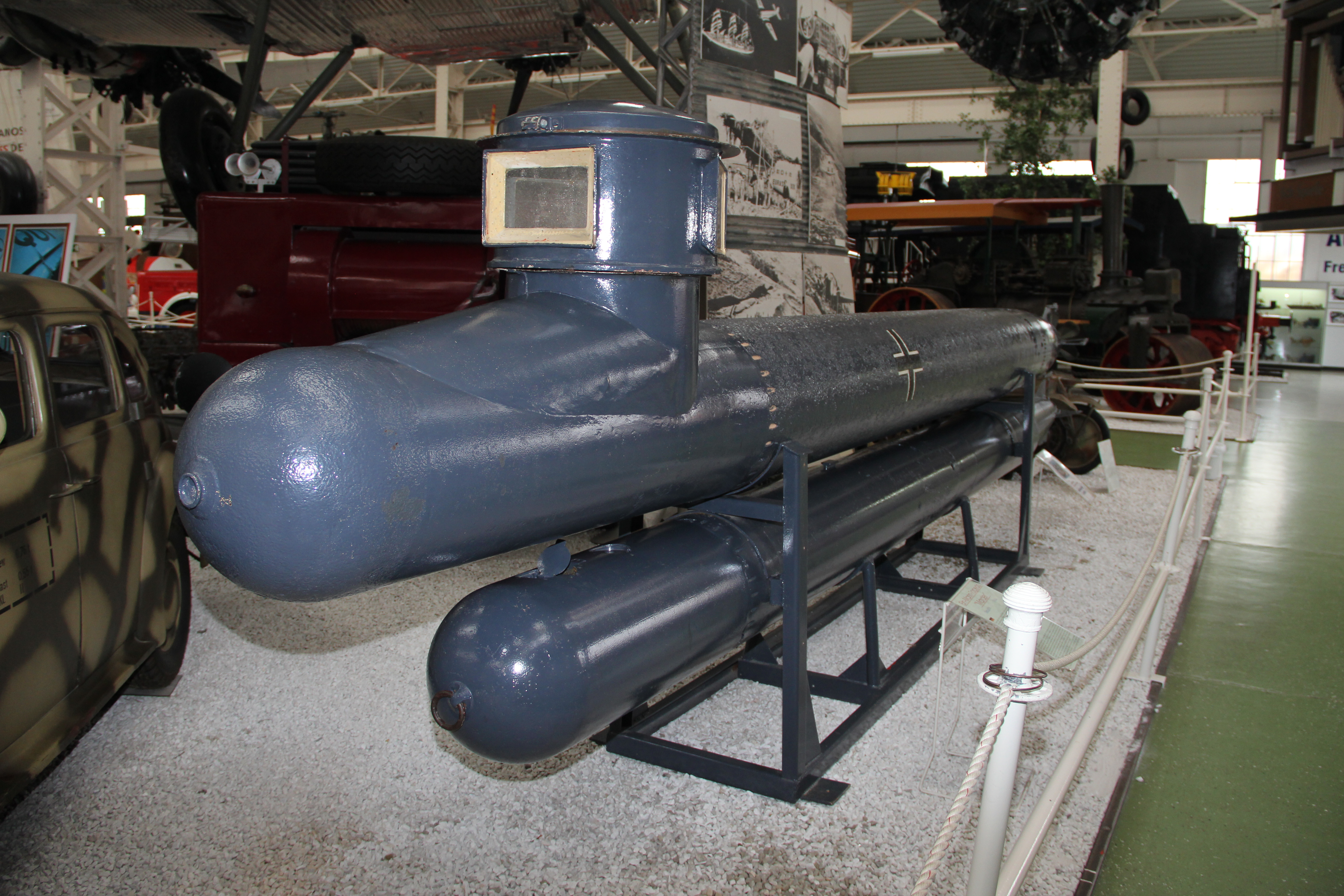
A Marder exhibited in Technik Museum Speyer, Germany. The depicted version is equipped with a conning tower and diver hatch.

- Marder: an improvement on the Neger with the addition of a diving tank and other features. The maximum diving depth was limited by the G7e depth-keeping mechanism at 15 m (49 ft), with normal operational depth not exceeding 10 m (33 ft). The Marder was 8.3 m (27 ft) long, with a body diameter of 53 cm (21 in). Total displacement, together with the payload, was approximately 5.5 tons. Top speed was 4.2 kn (7.8 km/h). The crew complement consisted of a single pilot.
- Hai: an experimental craft based on the Marder. The body was lengthened, with additional batteries installed in the midsection. The Hai was 11 m (36 ft) long, with a body diameter of 53 cm (21 in). Total displacement, together with the payload, was approximately 6 tons. Top speed was 4.2 kn (7.8 km/h). The depth characteristics were identical to those of the Marder. The crew complement consisted of a single pilot. Only a single unit was constructed, which was assessed as lacking manoeuvrability.
- Biber: midget submarines which carried two torpedoes and one or two men. There were other types that never reached production.

== Japan ==
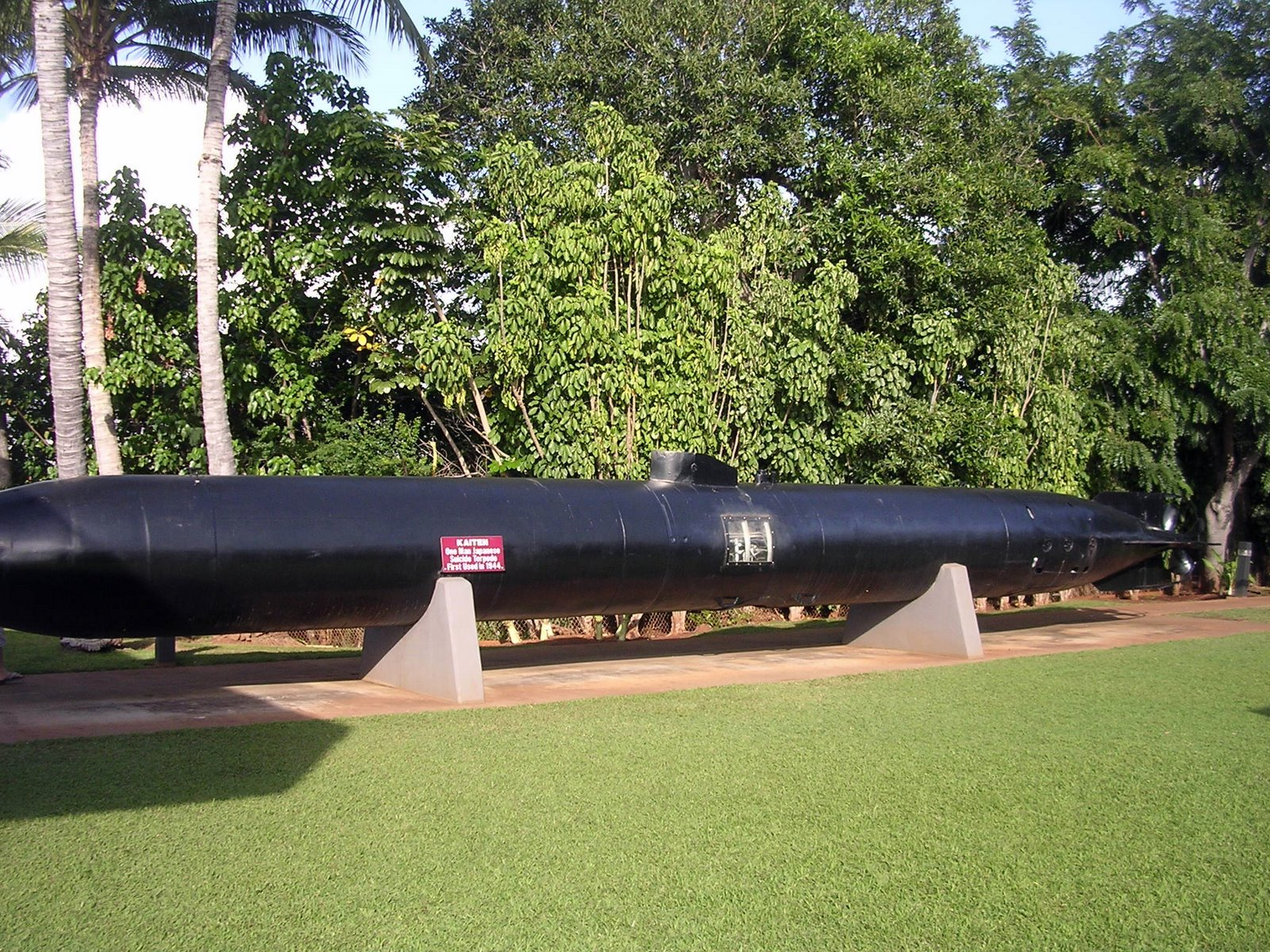
A captured Kaiten torpedo at the USS Bowfin Museum in Hawaii

=== World War II ===
- Kaiten: a manned fast torpedo intended to be piloted directly into its target, in practice becoming a suicide weapon. As such, its operation differed substantially from the human torpedo as used by Italian, British, and German militaries.

== Russia/USSR ==
=== After 1945 ===
- Siren: made after 1945, it is longer than a British or Italian Chariot because it has two warheads. It has two riders. It was designed to exit through a submarine's torpedo tube. See Russian commando frogmen.

== United States ==
=== After 1945 ===
There are pictures and descriptions of modern US Chariot-like underwater frogman-carriers used by Navy SEALs and a fast surface boat that can submerge, here:

- Swimmer Delivery Vehicle (SDV) SEAL Delivery Vehicle
- Swimmer Transport Device (STD)

== North Korea ==
It has been reported that North Korea has developed and deployed human torpedoes as part of its unconventional warfare tactics. These units, which are part of the 17th Sniper Corps, operate at the brigade level both in the East and in the West Sea Fleets. Each sea fleet has one suicide unit comprising elite soldiers who are well-fed and treated to a standard of living that is superior to that of submarine crews, even during periods of widespread economic hardship. The training regimen is focused on the execution of suicide bombing attacks.

Initially, the agents travel on submarines, but at a later stage, they embark on torpedoes, which they direct towards their targets. The agents are instructed to utilize a favourable tide to depart for their target, attach a magnetic bomb to it, retreat with the ebb tide, detonate the explosives remotely, and return to base via a small submarine. Possibly, light torpedoes could be fired at close range instead of planting remotely detonated explosives. Despite the fact that torpedo carriers are informed that they can escape, it is often exceedingly challenging in practice.

== Other countries ==
=== Argentina ===
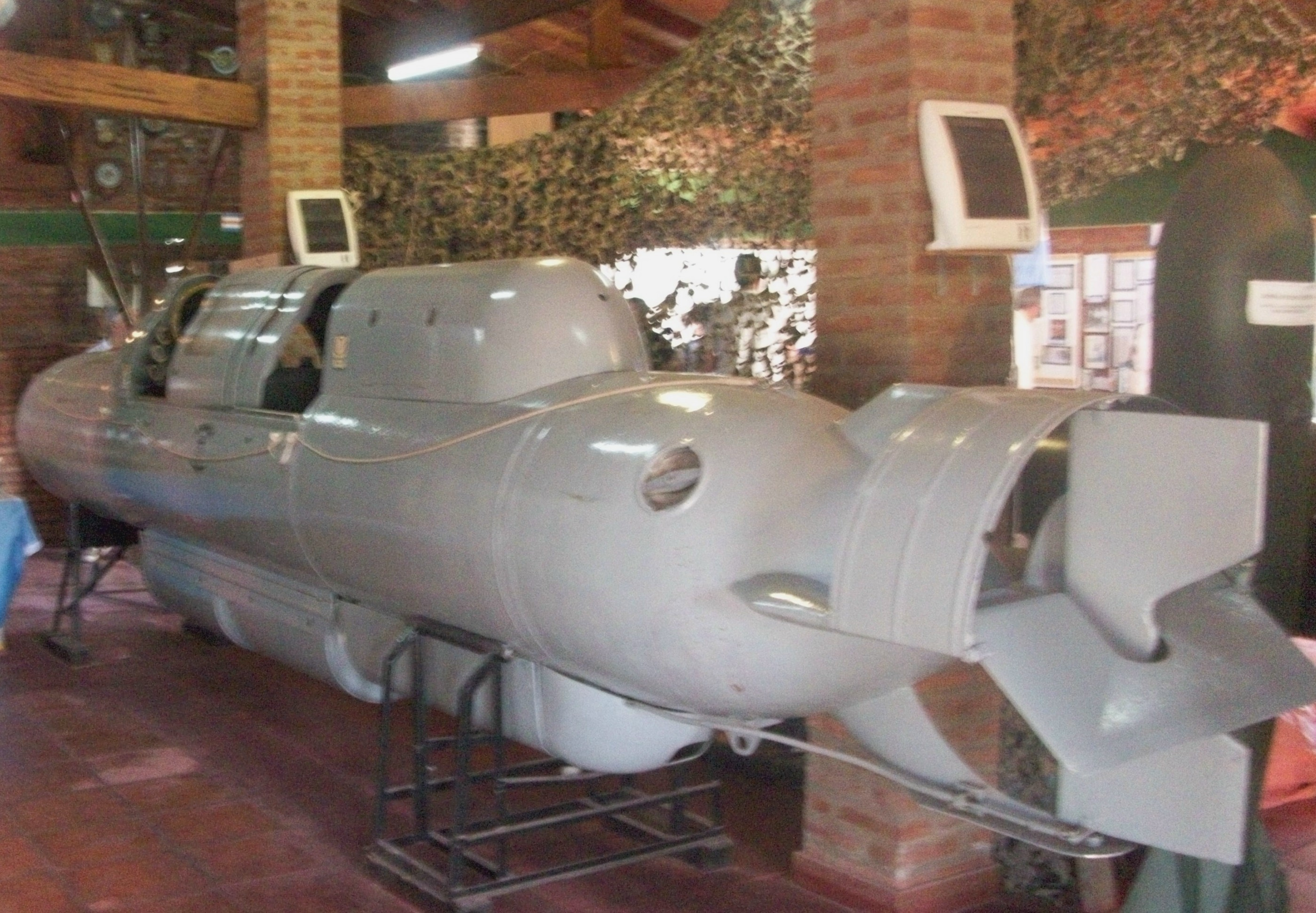
Argentine navy's CE2F/X100-T, designed for operations in cold waters

Argentina developed manned torpedoes and special mini-submarines in the 1950s, the latter with a torpedo attached under the two-man crew. Their crews were trained by Eugenio Wolk, a former member of the Italian Decima MAS.

=== Yugoslavia ===
The Yugoslav Navy did not have manned torpedoes, but frogmen used an underwater device called "R-1 Diver" for a variety of missions, including mine clearance, infiltration, clandestine surveillance and security, and assault missions on enemy shipping and naval objects. These small apparatuses were relegated to the navies of Croatia (HRM) (1991) and Montenegro (2007).

== Museums ==
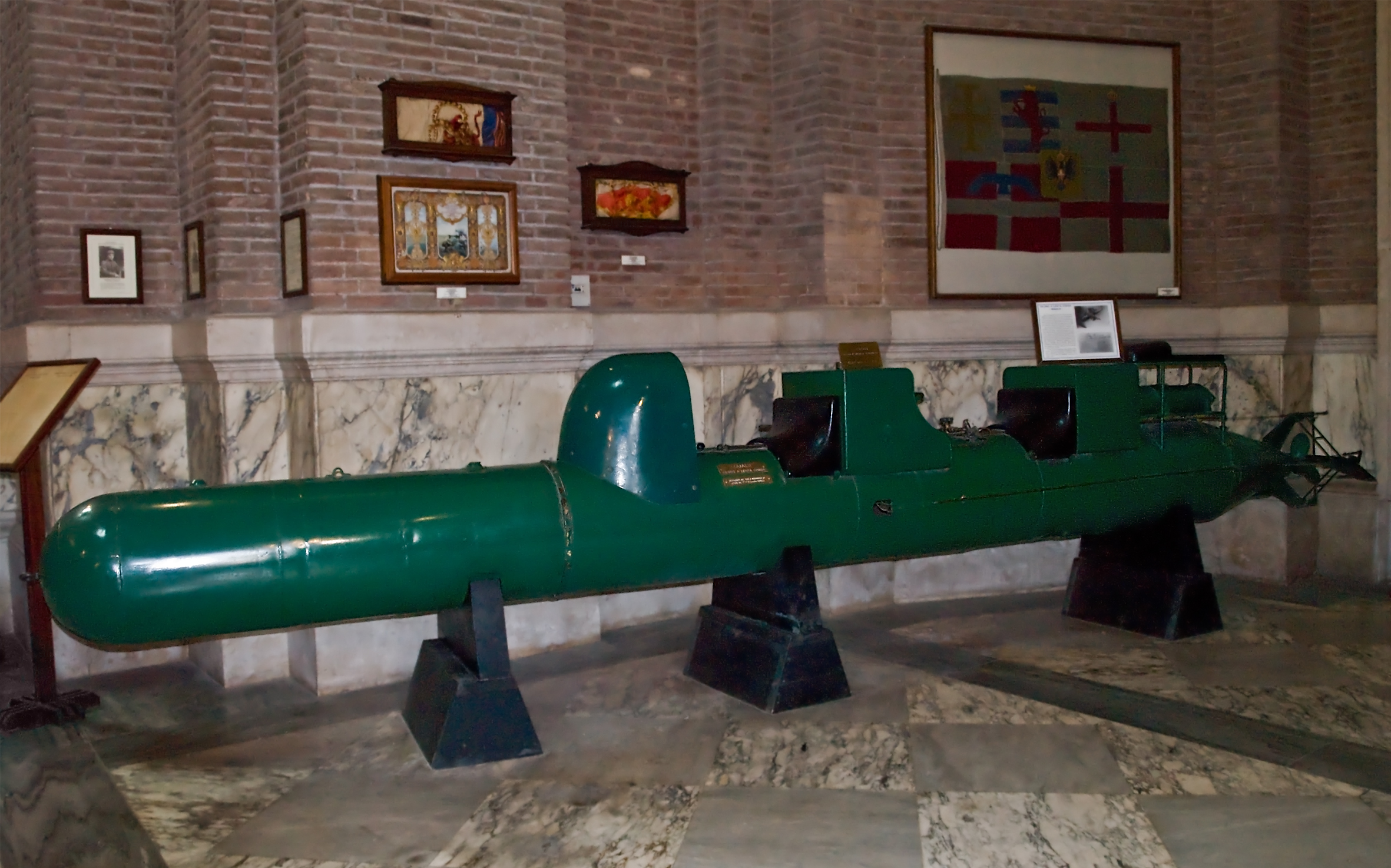
A SLC, or maiale, exhibited in the Museo Sacrario delle Bandiere delle Forze Armate, in Rome, Italy

- Original SLCs (Siluri Lenta Corsa or maiali), displayed at the Naval History Museum Venice, Italy.
- There are three chariots on public view in Eden Camp Museum near Malton, North Yorkshire in England:
  - A restored original British Mark II, which was found derelict in a scrapyard in Portsmouth. In this design, the two riders sat back to back.
  - A working chariot that was made in 1992 in Milton Keynes with approximately the outside appearance of a British wartime Mark I, but with differing internal working parts. It has been filmed in action for the television. It has a dummy warhead. It was last used in 2006.
  - A replica Italian maiale made soon after 1945 by the same Italian firm (Caproni) who made the wartime maiali. As of July 2008 this was on loan to the National Maritime Museum Cornwall in Falmouth, Cornwall until the end of 2008, but as of 16 March 2009 it was back in Eden Camp.
- There is an Italian SSB maiale in the Naval Museum at Groton, Connecticut, United States.

== In fiction ==
- The movie The Valiant, made in 1962, is about the sinking of HMS Valiant in Alexandria harbour. There is also a 1953 Italian movie (I sette dell'Orsa Maggiore; Hell Raiders of the Deep) about the attack, done with some real members of Decima Flottiglia MAS as support actors in the cast.
- The film Above Us the Waves (released in 1955) concentrates on the midget submarine attack on the German battleship Tirpitz. The film has a scene of a fight between British and German frogmen at an anti-submarine net; this never happened in the real attack on Tirpitz.
- The film The Silent Enemy (released in 1958) does not represent real events accurately. In particular, in the real world there was no attack on the Olterra and no underwater hand-to-hand battle between Italian and British frogmen. The breathing sets used by the film actors representing the Italian frogmen seem to be British naval-type rebreathers and not authentic Italian rebreathers. The three chariots seen in the movie, representing Italian maiali, were crudely made film props rather than replicas.
- A film The Eagle Has Landed briefly features a German paratroop Officer, a Colonel played by Michael Caine and his men who have been sent to man chariots on the Channel Islands.
- Ian Fleming who wrote the James Bond stories was in Naval Intelligence stationed at Gibraltar in the war, and was probably aware of the Italian operations. The chariot seen in the James Bond film On Her Majesty's Secret Service is a realistic-looking but non-functioning film prop. When seen it is in a kit store. It does not take part in any action; the action happens up a mountain in the Swiss Alps. Underwater vehicles (not chariot-shaped) also featured in the James Bond film Thunderball.
- In Metal Gear Solid, Solid Snake uses a human torpedo to approach Shadow Moses island.
- In Infinity Ward's Call of Duty: Modern Warfare 2, Operators from "Task Force 141" use two human torpedoes to approach one of the four oil rigs. This takes place in the mission: The only easy day, was yesterday.
- In the game Battlestations: Pacific, Kaitens and Kaiten-carrying submarines are player-controllable units.
- In Hidden & Dangerous 2, the only mission set in Norway, entitled "Operation Seawolf: Steam Piping", is based on the failed Operation Title from 31 October 1942 against Tirpitz.

== See also ==
- Diver propulsion vehicle – Powered device for diver mobility and range extension
- Frogman – Tactical scuba diver
- Kaiten – Japanese manned suicide torpedoes used by the Imperial Navy in World War II
- MT explosive motorboat – Weapon of the Regia Marina
- Midget submarine – Submarine under 150 tons
- Wet sub – Ambient pressure diver propulsion vehicle
- X-class submarine – Midget submarine class built for the Royal Navy during 1943–44
- XE-class submarine – 1944 class of British midget submarines
