= Geoffrey Sladen =

England international rugby union player

Geoffrey Sladen DSC DSO
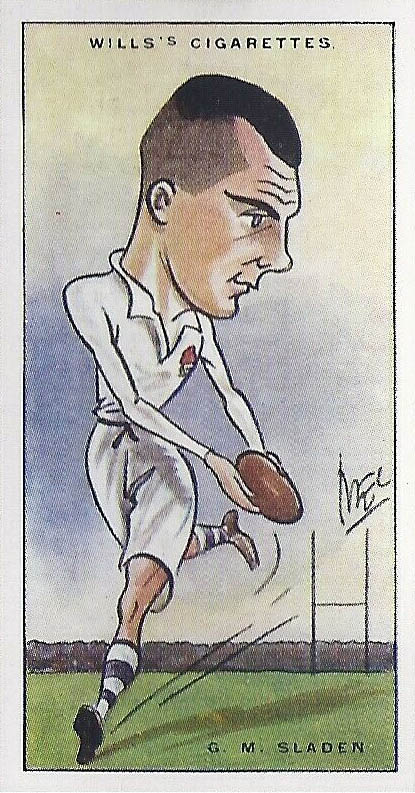
- Full name: Geoffrey Mainwaring Sladen
- Born: 3 August 1904 Reigate, Surrey, England
- Died: 4 October 1985 (aged 81) Dumfriesshire, Scotland

Rugby union career
- Position: Centre
International career
Years	Team	Apps	(Points)
1929	England	3	(0)

Commander Geoffrey Mainwaring Sladen (3 August 1904 – 4 October 1985) was a Royal Navy officer and England international rugby union player. He invented the Sladen Suit, a drysuit used by British manned torpedo riders.

Born in Reigate, Sladen attended Royal Naval College in Osborne and Dartmouth after finishing school. He played rugby in the navy and was capped three times for England in the 1929 Five Nations as a centre three-quarter.

Sladen was Commanding Officer of HMS Trident during World War II. He received a Distinguished Service Cross (DSC) in 1940 for demonstrating "courage, enterprise and resource". His submarine torpedoed the German cruiser Prinz Eugen off the Norwegian coast in 1942 and it had to be towed back to Germany for repairs due to a damaged stern. For this, Sladen was awarded a bar to his DSC. It was later revealed that for several weeks HMS Trident had on board a reindeer, which had been gifted by the Soviets and was being transported to London Zoo.

== See also ==
- List of England national rugby union players
