= HMS P311 =

Submarine of the Royal Navy

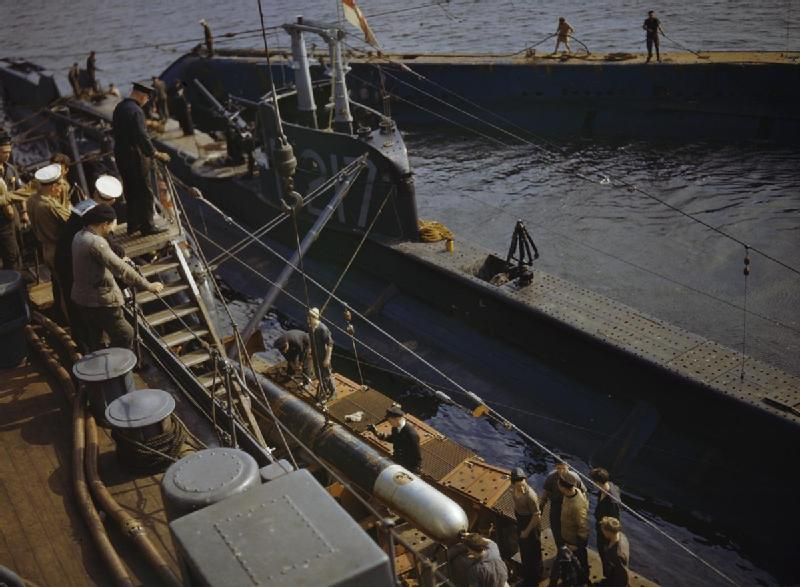
- Practice torpedo is loaded onto P311 at the Holy Loch, Scotland, 1942

History

United Kingdom
- Name: HMS P311
- Ordered: 11 June 1931
- Builder: Vickers-Armstrongs, Barrow
- Laid down: 25 April 1941
- Launched: 5 March 1942
- Commissioned: 7 August 1942
- Fate: Missing after 31 December 1942
- Badge

General characteristics
- Displacement: 1,290 tons surfaced; 1,560 tons submerged
- Length: 276 ft 6 in (84.28 m)
- Beam: 25 ft 6 in (7.77 m)
- Draught: 12 ft 9 in (3.89 m) forward; 14 ft 7 in (4.45 m) aft
- Propulsion: Two shafts; Twin diesel engines 2,500 hp (1.86 MW) each; Twin electric motors 1,450 hp (1.08 MW) each
- Speed: 15.5 knots (28.7 km/h) surfaced; 9 knots (20 km/h) submerged
- Range: 4,500 nautical miles at 11 knots (8,330 km at 20 km/h) surfaced
- Test depth: 300 ft (91 m)
- Complement: 61
- Armament: 6 internal forward-facing 21-inch (533 mm) torpedo tubes; 2 external forward-facing torpedo tubes; 2 external amidships rear-facing torpedo tubes; 1 external rear-facing torpedo tubes; 6 reload torpedoes; 1 x 4-inch (102 mm) deck gun

HMS P311 was a T-class submarine of the Royal Navy, the only boat of her class never to be given a name. She was to have received the name Tutankhamen but was lost before this was formally done. P311 was a Group 3 T-class boat built by Vickers-Armstrongs at Barrow-in-Furness and commissioned on 5 March 1942 under the command of Lieutenant R.D. Cayley. She was one of only two T-class submarines completed without an Oerlikon 20 mm anti-aircraft gun, the other being HMS Trespasser.

== Naming ==
The prime minister, Winston Churchill had minuted the Admiralty on 5 November 1942, 19 December, and again on 27 December, saying that all submarines should have names. In the last he provided a list of suggestions and insisted that all unnamed submarines be given names within a fortnight. P311 was to be assigned the name Tutankhamen, after the Egyptian king. She would have been the only vessel of the Royal Navy, before or since, to bear the name. She was lost in the Mediterranean between late December 1942 or early January 1943, before the new name could be formally assigned. She therefore never received the name Tutankhamen, and is officially designated as P311.

== Career ==
She joined the 10th Submarine Flotilla at Malta in November 1942, and was lost with all hands between 30 December 1942 and 8 January 1943 whilst en route to La Maddalena, Sardinia, where she was to attack two Italian 8-inch gun cruisers, the Gorizia and the Trieste, using chariot manned torpedoes carried on the casing as part of Operation Principal. The submarine sent her final received signal on 31 December 1942, from position 38º10'N, 11º30'E. She was reported overdue on 8 January 1943 when she failed to return to base. It is presumed that she was sunk by Italian mines in the approaches to Maddalena on or around 2 January 1943.

== Wreck discovery ==
In late May 2016 the Royal Navy announced that it was investigating a wreck found close to Tavolara Island by diver Massimo Domenico Bondone on 21 May 2016 which Bondone had identified as P311. Bondone reported that he made the identification based on the wreck having two chariots strapped to her hull. The bodies of the 71 crew members and chariot operators who perished are reported still on board, believed to have died of suffocation. The vessel is reported as being in good condition and pictures have been released of the underwater wreck. It is reported that only the bow is seriously damaged due to the mine explosion which sank her.

== See also ==
- British commando frogmen
