= Sladen Suit =

Early British military drysuit

Diver in Sladen Suit

The Sladen Suit was a heavy type of British divers' drysuit made by Siebe Gorman. It is entered by a wide rubber tube at the waist: this tube is folded and tied off before the diver dives. It was used by British manned torpedo riders and for general underwater work.

It was sometimes nicknamed "Clammy Death".

The first model had two small glazed viewports. It was redesigned with the single oval flip-up viewport so the wearer could get binoculars to his eyes.

== "Universal" rebreather ==
There was an oxygen rebreather called the "Universal" that was designed to be used with it. The Universal was a long-dive derivative of the Davis Submerged Escape Apparatus.

== In popular culture ==
- Brian Evenson's collection of literary horror, Windeye, includes a story entitled, and about, "The Sladen Suit."
