= HMS Trooper =

Submarine of the Royal Navy

Coordinates: 39°48′N 18°43′E

- HMS Trooper

History

United Kingdom
- Name: HMS Trooper
- Builder: Scotts, Greenock
- Laid down: 7 May 1940
- Launched: 5 March 1942
- Commissioned: 29 August 1942
- Identification: Pennant number N91
- Fate: Sunk 17 October 1943
- Badge

General characteristics
- Class & type: British T-class submarine
- Displacement: 1,090 tons surfaced; 1,575 tons submerged
- Length: 275 ft (84 m)
- Beam: 26 ft 6 in (8.08 m)
- Draught: 16.3 ft (5.0 m)
- Propulsion: Two shafts; Twin diesel engines 2,500 hp (1.86 MW) each; Twin electric motors 1,450 hp (1.08 MW) each
- Speed: 15.25 knots (28.7 km/h) surfaced; Nine knots (20 km/h) submerged
- Range: 4,500 nautical miles at 11 knots (8,330 km at 20 km/h) surfaced
- Test depth: 300 ft (91 m) max
- Complement: 61
- Armament: Six internal forward-facing 21-inch (533 mm) torpedo tubes; Two external forward-facing torpedo tubes; Three external backward-facing torpedo tubes; Six reload torpedoes; 1 x 4-inch (102 mm) deck gun; Three anti-aircraft machine guns
- Notes: The wreck was discovered in October 2024 in the Icarian Sea in Greece, at a depth of 253 meters.

HMS Trooper (N91) was a T-class submarine of the Royal Navy. She was laid down by Scotts, Greenock, and launched in March 1942. On 3 October 2024 it was reported HMS Trooper was discovered at a depth of 253 metres (830 ft) in the Icarian Sea in Greece.

== Career ==
Trooper spent most of her short career serving in the Mediterranean. She sank the Italian tanker Rosario, the Italian merchant ship Forli, a sailing vessel and the Italian submarine Pietro Micca. She also damaged two other enemy vessels, and unsuccessfully attacked the Italian merchant Belluno (the former French Fort de France).

On her first operation, she took part in Operation Principal, which used human torpedoes to sink Italian ships in Palermo harbour.

Trooper sailed from Beirut on 26 September 1943, on her 8th War Patrol to cover in the Aegean Sea off the Dodecanese islands. On 14 October she challenged Levant Schooner Flotilla F8 off Alinda Bay in Leros. She failed to return on 17 October and was reported overdue on that day. She was presumed lost on German mines around Leros, but her wreck was later discovered in the Icarian Sea.

The Germans claimed Trooper was sunk by Q-ship GA.45 on 15 October 1943. The submarine GA-45 attacked was actually HMS Torbay which escaped undamaged.

== Discovery ==
HMS Trooper was discovered at a depth of 253 metres (830 ft) in the Icarian Sea, north of the island of Donousa in Greece. The submarine, found in three distinct sections (bow, mid-section, and stern), had likely been sunk by a German EMF mine containing 350 kilograms (770 lb) of Hexanite. This discovery, led by Greek researcher Kostas Thoctaridis, resolved an 81-year-old mystery, bringing closure to the families of the 64 crew members lost during the submarine's final mission.

== Bibliography ==
- Colledge, J. J.; Warlow, Ben (2006) [1969]. Ships of the Royal Navy: The Complete Record of All Fighting Ships of the Royal Navy from the 15th Century to the Present (3rd Rev ed.). London: Chatham Publishing. ISBN 978-1-86176-281-8. OCLC 67375475.
- Grant, David Renwick (2006). A Submarine at War: The Brief Life of HMS Trooper. Periscope Publishing.
- Hutchinson, Robert (2001). Jane's Submarines: War Beneath the Waves from 1776 to the Present Day. London: HarperCollins. ISBN 978-0-00-710558-8. OCLC 53783010.
