= Raid on Souda Bay =

Boat Assault on Royal Navy ships in Crete

- Part of the Battle of the Mediterranean of the Second World War
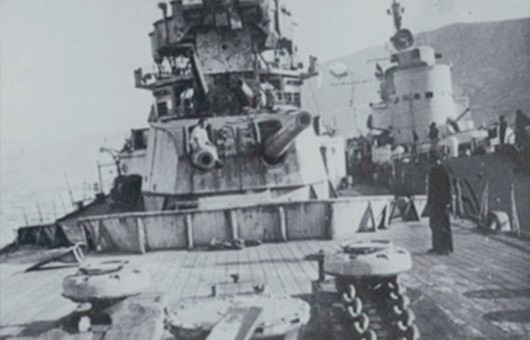
- The hulk of HMS York with Sirio alongside
Date	26 March 1941
Location	Souda Bay, Mediterranean Sea 35°29′0″N 24°08′17″E
Result	Italian victory

Belligerents
United Kingdom; Norway	Italy

Commanders and leaders
Reginald Portal	Luigi Faggioni (POW)

Strength
3 cruisers; 1 destroyer; 5 tankers and fleet auxiliaries	2 destroyers; 6 MTM (motor assault boats)

Casualties and losses
2 killed; 1 heavy cruiser; 1 tanker	6 (POW)

The Raid on Souda Bay was an attack by the Decima MAS (X-MAS), a specialist unit of the Regia Marina that used unconventional weapons. Decima MAS used explosive boats (MTM) against British ships lying in Souda Bay, Crete, during the early hours of 26 March 1941. The MTM explosive boats had been ferried from Astypalaia by the destroyers Francesco Crispi and Quintino Sella and launched at the approaches to the bay. After crossing the three boom defences, the MTM attacked the British heavy cruiser HMS York and the Norwegian tanker Pericles (8,324 GRT).

Two MTM hit York, which took on a list and was towed by the destroyer HMS Hasty and beached; Pericles sank in the shallows. Most of its oil was recovered and the ship eventually was refloated, only to founder on tow to Alexandria, breaking up and being sunk by gunfire. The six MTM pilots, Luigi Faggioni, Alessio de Vito, Emilio Barberi, Angelo Cabrini, Tullio Tedeschi and Lino Beccati were taken prisoner and were later awarded the Italian Gold Medal of Military Valor (Medaglia d'oro al valor militare). A MTM was recovered undamaged by the British and studied.

== Background ==
=== Decima MAS ===
The interest of the Regia Marina in small boat warfare lay dormant between 1918 and the diplomatic crisis with Britain over the Second Italo-Ethiopian War 1935–1936. In 1935 and early 1936, Captain Teseo Tesei and Captain Elios Toschi tested a human torpedo in La Spezia on the Tyrrhenian Sea and resumed testing in May. The Ethiopian defeat in 1936 ended the tests but work on assault boats continued. On 28 September 1938, Supermarina ordered the I Flottiglia MAS (1st Torpedo Motorboat Flotilla), based at La Spezia, to establish a research department (the Sezione Armi Speciali (Special Weapons Section) from 1939. The detachment had a few officers at HQ, seven at a confidential base at Bocca di Serchio for human torpedo and frogman training and another six officers to pilot the assault motorboats, of which seven had been built, plus eleven human torpedoes.

On 24 February 1940, the 1st MAS Flotilla and the Special Weapons Section was taken over by Commander Mario Giorgini and in August attempts to use the unconventional weapons began, with little success and the capture of Giorgini in October. On 23 January 1941 Commander Vittorio Moccagatta replaced Giorgini and on 15 March formed the Decima Flottiglia Motoscafi Armati Siluranti (10th Flotilla, Torpedo Armed Motorboats, Decima MAS). The new force had a HQ, including a plans office and a weapons section. The surface assault boats and the training school (Lieutenant-Commander Giorgio Giobbe) were split from the human torpedoes and other underwater weapons (Lieutenant-Commander Junio Valerio Borghese), captain of the Italian submarine Scirè. Decima MAS remained at La Spezia and an advanced base was set up in Augusta, Sicily.

=== Decima MAS equipment ===
==== Siluro lenta corsa (SLC) ====
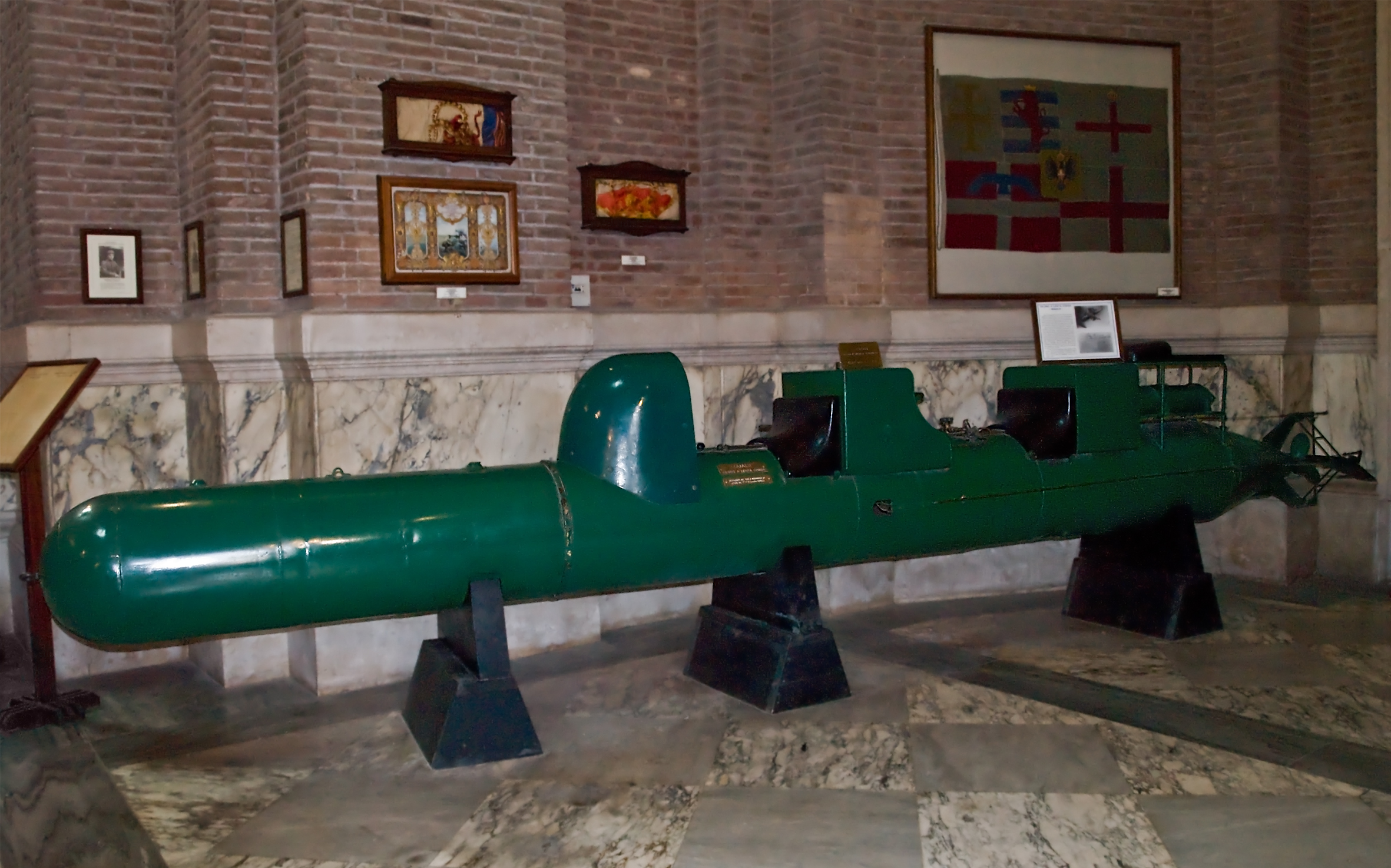
A SLC (Maiale at the Museo Sacrario delle Bandiere delle Forze Armate, Rome.

The Siluro Lenta Corsa (SLC, slow speed torpedo), known as a Maiale (pig), was designed by Tesei and Toschi in 1935 and 1936. By late 1939 about eleven were ready and in July 1940 the production version, Series 100, began to arrive. In 1941 the improved Series 200 became ready for use. The standard 533 mm (21.0 in) torpedo with double propellers was changed to one larger propeller in a cowling; seats for a two-man crew were installed, with shields housing the controls. The SLC weighed 1.3–1.4 long tons (1.3–1.4 t) and was 22–24 ft (6.7–7.3 m) long. The 1.6 hp (1.2 kW) electric motor moved the maiale at 2–3 nmi (3.7–5.6 km; 2.3–3.5 mi) at a maximum depth of 50 ft (15 m). At the target the crew detached a 6 ft (1.8 m)-long warhead with 510 to 570 lb (230 to 260 kg) of explosive, detonated by a timer. The maiale crews the Gamma frogmen wore Belloni rubberised suits with a closed-circuit re-breathing apparatus to avoid bubbles. The Gamma frogmen carried explosive charges, five 9.9 lb (4.5 kg) cimici (bedbugs) or two 26 lb (12 kg) bauletti, (little trunks) and attached them to a ship's hull, with a timed detonation. (Note: Students at the Gamma training school, which began in September 1940, had a stringent ten-month course; about fifty graduates undertook operations during the war.)

==== Motoscafo trasporto lento (MTL) ====
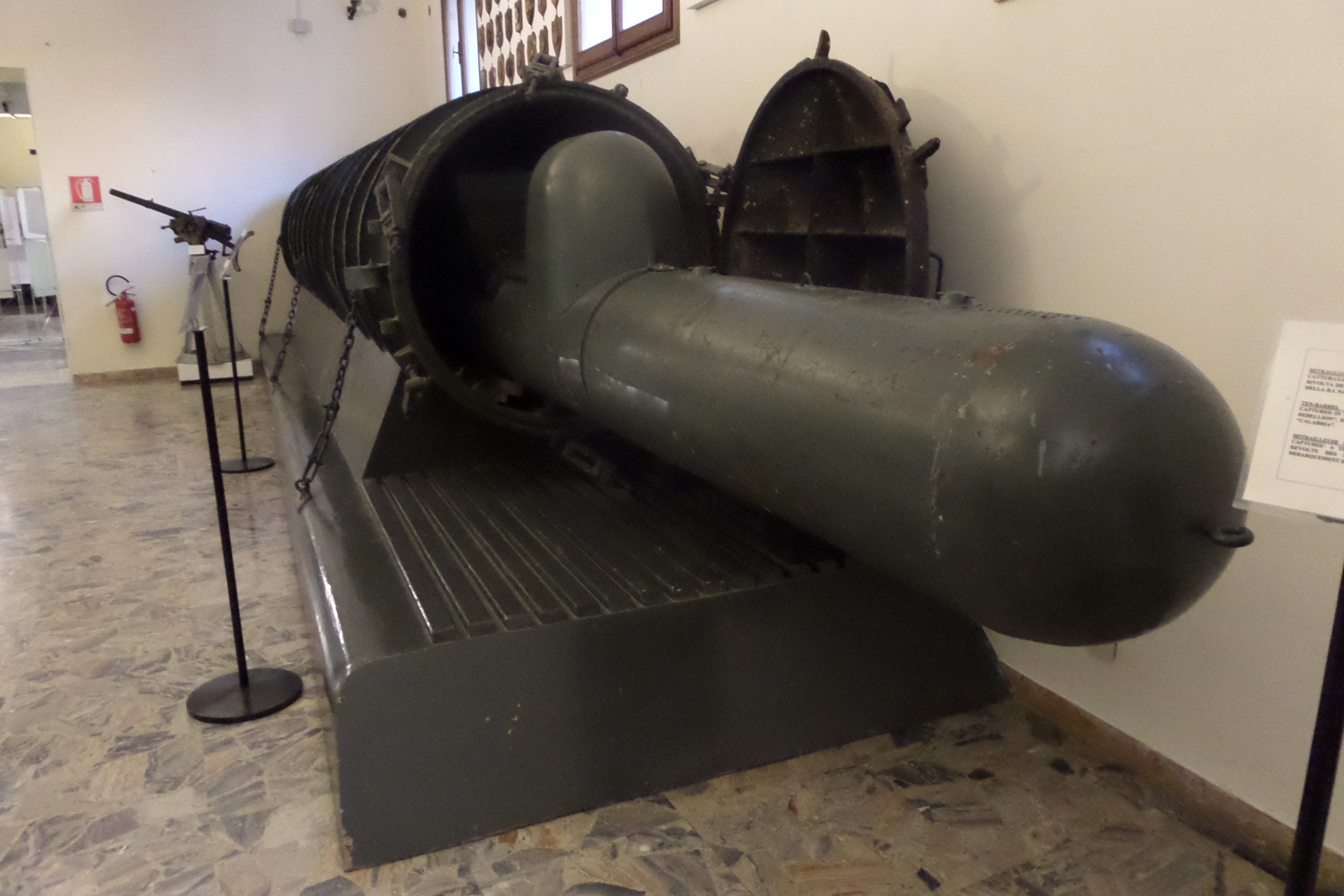
Container for a maiale to be attached to the deck of a submarine

Maiali and SLCs needed transport close to the target because the re-breather lasted no more than six hours and maiali had a range of only 4 nmi (7.4 km; 4.6 mi) at full speed and a maximum of 15 nmi (28 km; 17 mi) at cruising speed. The modified destroyers Francesco Crispi and Quintino Sella, had carried the MTM used in the successful Raid on Souda Bay (25/26 March 1941). The Motoscafo trasporto lento (MTL, slow transport motorboat) was a wooden-hulled boat 28 ft (8.5 m) long by 9 ft 6 in (2.9 m) wide, to carry maiali close to the target. The MTL had a range of only 60 nmi (110 km; 69 mi) cruising at 5 kn (9.3 km/h; 5.8 mph), few were built and they were rarely used. Surface transport gave way to submarines; early in 1940 the Italian submarine Ametista began tests as a maiale transport. The maximum depth of submersion was only 98 ft (30 m); Italian submarine Iride was converted in July 1940 but was sunk on 21 August. Italian submarine Gondar was sunk on 30 September, even though the three maiali cylinders could be flooded, allowing the boat to reach a depth of 295 ft (90 m).

==== Motoscafo turismo (MT/MTM) ====
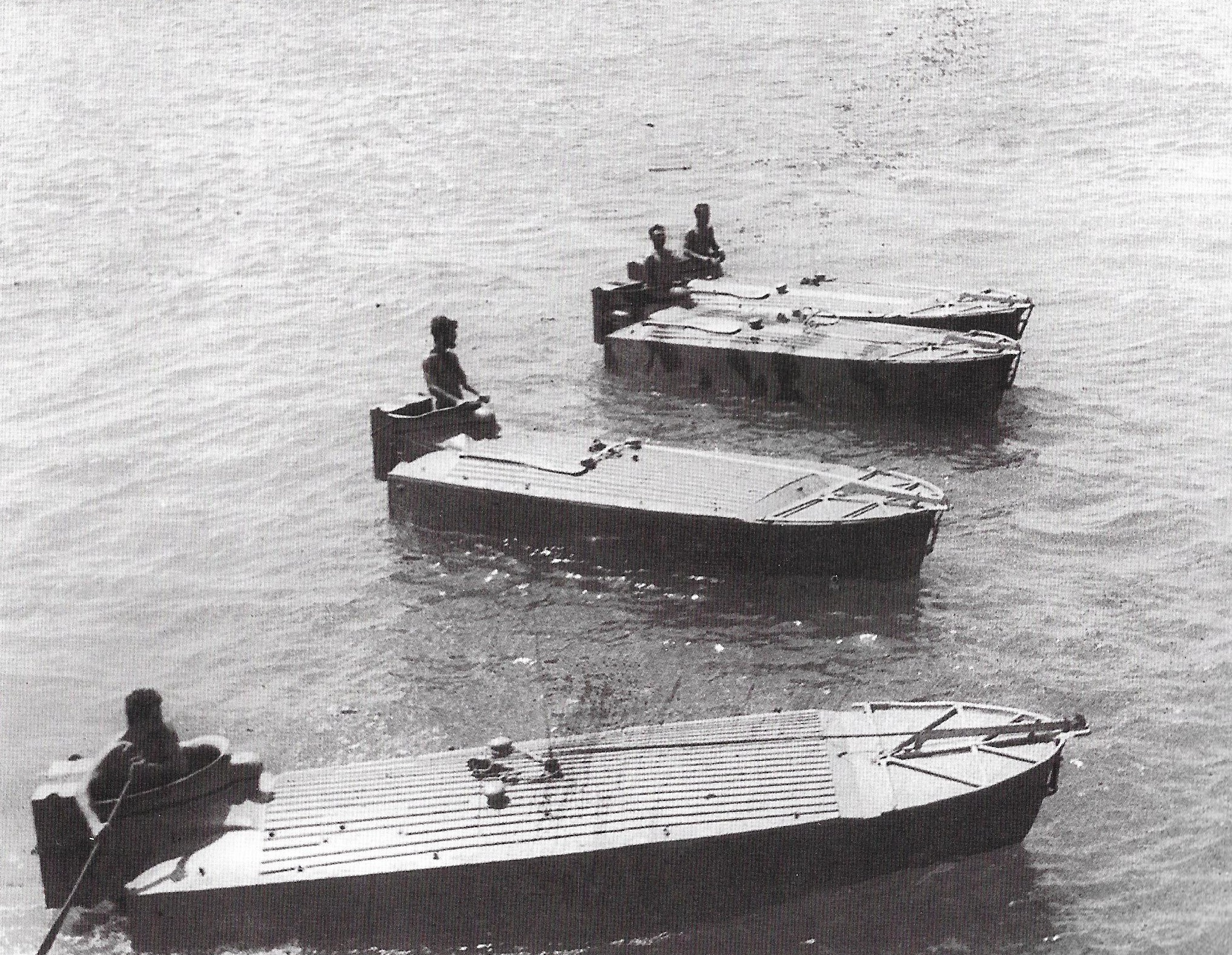
MTM of Decima MAS

The first Motoscafo turismo (MT) became known as barchini (little boats) were built in late 1938, six MT being delivered in early 1939. An improved version MT Modificato (MTM) tested in November 1940, was 20 ft (6.1 m) long. Both types carried an explosive charge of 660–730 lb (300–330 kg) in the bows at up to 31 kn (57 km/h; 36 mph). The MTM was fitted with a seat back–life raft behind the pilot for him to float on after dropping off the MTM, while waiting to be rescued. Twelve MTs were built and about forty MTMs. Early in 1941, a smaller MT Ridotto was built with a height of 3 ft 9 in (1.14 m) to fit inside the deck cylinders of submarines with the same explosive charge but they were never used in this manner.

==== MT Siluranti (MTS) ====
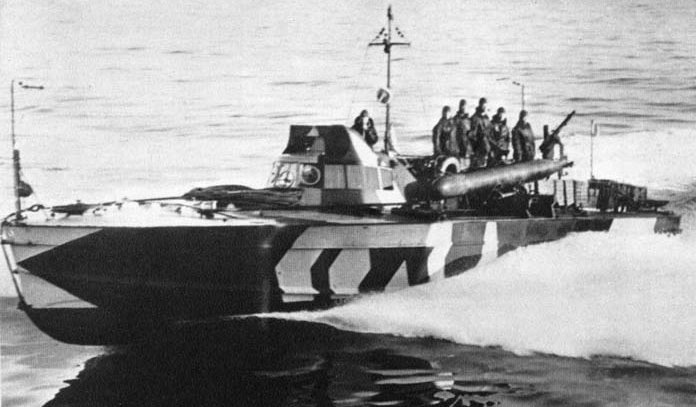
Motoscafo armato silurante

The MT Siluranti (MTS, torpedo motorboat), was a small boat carrying one or two modified 450 mm (18 in) torpedoes, the MTS being more manoeuvrable than the usual Motoscafo armato silurante. The first MTS, of early 1941, could reach 28 kn (52 km/h; 32 mph) with a range of 85 nmi (158 km). The Decima MAS was assisted by Regia Marina MAS boats, which by June 1940, had fifty Class 500 MAS and another 25 in 1941 in four versions. The Class 500 was 61 ft (18.7 m) long by 15 ft (4.7 m) wide at the beam, with a displacement of 21.7–28.9 long tons; 24.3–32.4 short tons (22–29.4 t). The MAS had a crew of 9 to 13 men and had two 18 in (450 mm) torpedoes, 6–10 depth charges and a 13.2 mm (0.52 in) heavy machine-gun (replaced in 1941 with a Breda 20 mm cannon). The MAS could move at 44 kn (81 km/h; 51 mph) and had a range of 645–1,600 nmi (1,195–2,963 km; 742–1,841 mi).

Decima MAS equipment
Name	Acronym	English translation	Notes
Uomini Gamma	—	Gamma Men	Frogmen sabotage specialists
Motoscafo armato silurante	MAS	Armed torpedo motorboat	Similar to a British Motor torpedo boat (MTB)
Motoscafo turismo	MT	Leisure motorboat	Explosive assault boat, 12 built
Motoscafo trasporto lento	MTL	Slow transport motorboat	Known as Barchini (little boats)
Motoscafo da Turismo Silurante Modificato	MTM	Improved explosive assault motorboat	Forty built
Motoscafo turismo ridotto	MTR	Small assault motorboat	
Motoscafo turismo silurante	MTS	Torpedo motorboat	
MTS modificato	MTSM	Improved torpedo motorboat	
Siluro lenta corsa	SLC	Slow human torpedo	

=== Souda Bay ===
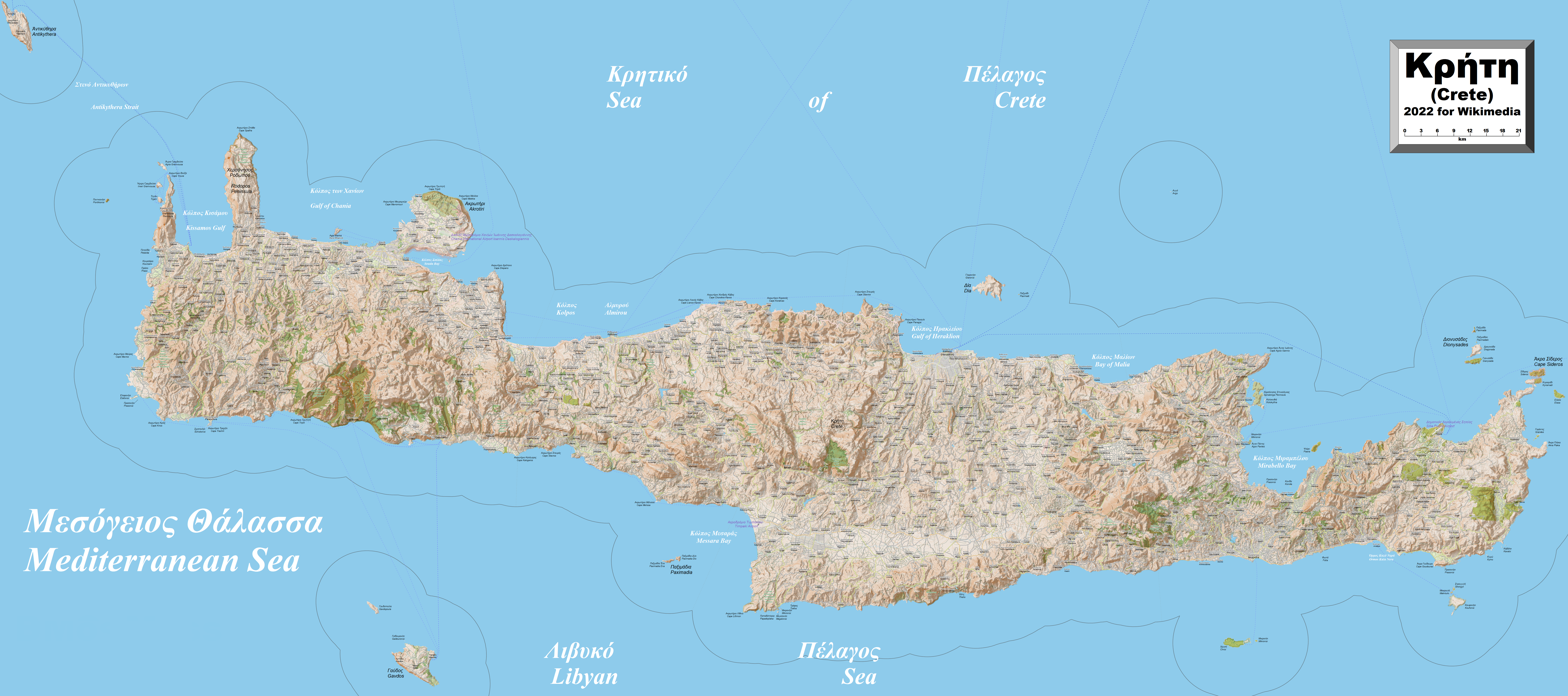
Crete; Souda Bay is on the north-west coast

Souda Bay (Suda Bay to the British) is a naturally protected harbour on the north-western coast of the island of Crete, about 4.3 mi (7 km) long with a depth of 33–39 ft (10–12 m) at the mouth, increasing to 230–390 ft (70–120 m) inside. The bay had been chosen as a target by the X-MAS months before, because it had become a busy anchorage for the fuelling of ships of the Royal Navy, tankers and other support ships. Recent air reconnaissance had spotted a number of naval and merchant ships at anchor.

== Prelude ==
On 24 March, aerial reconnaissance photographs showed a cruiser, two destroyers and twelve merchant ships at anchor in Souda Bay. Later information indicated one cruiser and eight merchant ships but by the time the operation, more ships had entered the bay. The heavy cruiser HMS York, the light cruiser Gloucester, the anti-aircraft cruiser Calcutta, the destroyer HMS Hasty, RFA Cherryleaf (5,934 GRT) and Dumana (8,427 GRT) an RAF flying boat tender and the tankers Desmoulea (8,120 GRT), Marie Mærsk (8,271 GRT) and Pericles (8,324 GRT) were present. Desmoulea remained disabled in harbor, having been damaged in the Attack on Convoy AN 14 by the Italian torpedo boats Lupo and Libra in January. York had arrived with Gloucester from Operation MC 9, escorting Convoy MW 6 to Malta, at 14:00 on 25 March. On the night of 25/26 March 1941, Crispi and Sella departed from the island of Astypalaia, each carrying three 2 long tons (2.0 t) MTM (barchini), the six pilots led by Tenente di vascello (Lieutenant) Luigi Faggioni were Alessio de Vito, Emilio Barberi, Angelo Cabrini, Tullio Tedeschi and Lino Beccati. The destroyers were to release the MTM 10 nmi (19 km; 12 mi) from the mouth of Souda Bay. At 23:30, the destroyers reached the launching point, quickly unloaded the MTM and turned for home.

== Attack ==
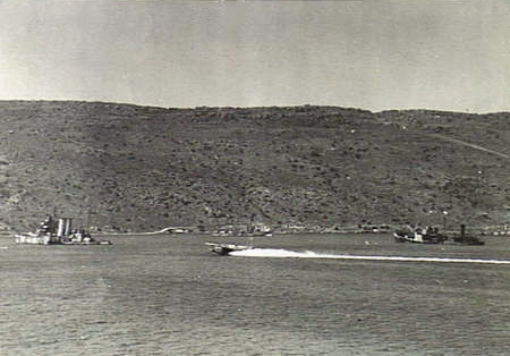
York and Pericles beached; a Sunderland flying boat lands between them

The MTMs made their way to the entrance of the bay where one MTM was obstructed by the net barrage but managed to get past and joined the rest of the formation near an islet in the mouth of the bay. At 04:30 on 26 March, Faggioni bypassed the inner net by going close to the shore and then moved along it, towards the centre of the bay, the MTM pilots using oars to move quietly. Faggioni called the boats together and resumed the advance towards the third net barrage, about 3 nmi (5.6 km; 3.5 mi) away.

Two searchlights turned on as the anti-aircraft cruiser HMS Coventry entered the bay, causing the MTM crews to think that they had been discovered. The MTM then had to wait until there was enough natural light to attack. Faggioni briefed the pilots; two were to attack York, about 1,600 ft (500 m) away; Faggioni and another MTM pilot waited in reserve in case the attack failed. The fifth and sixth MTM pilots made ready to attack the merchant ships. Soon after 05:00, as dawn was breaking, the first two MTMs moved to about 980 ft (300 m) from York and waited for another fifteen minutes for the sky to clear, then sped towards the cruiser, the pilots abandoning their MTM about 260 ft (80 m) from the ship. At 05:11 the officer of the watch on York heard the sound of an engine, mistook it for an aircraft and before he could raise the alarm the ship was hit.

An explosion occurred amidships on the starboard side, killing two members of the crew. The ship took on a list to starboard and settled by the stern. The two MTMs had exploded against York amidships. A hole had been blown in the side of the hull 25 ft × 11 ft (7.6 m × 3.4 m) upwards from the bilge keel. The side plating upwards of the bilge keel for 25 ft (7.6 m) and for 8 ft (2.4 m) below the bilge keel had been severely damaged. A9 and 8B 9 boiler rooms and the forward engine rooms were immediately flooded, with slow flooding in the after engine room and compartments nearby. Steam, lighting and power was lost and the cruiser was immobilised. York was towed to the shore by Hasty and beached in 27 ft (8.2 m) of water. Pericles was severely damaged and settled on the bottom. The anti-aircraft guns of the base opened fire randomly, believing that the base was under air attack. The six pilots were captured, along with an intact MTM.

== Aftermath ==
=== Analysis ===
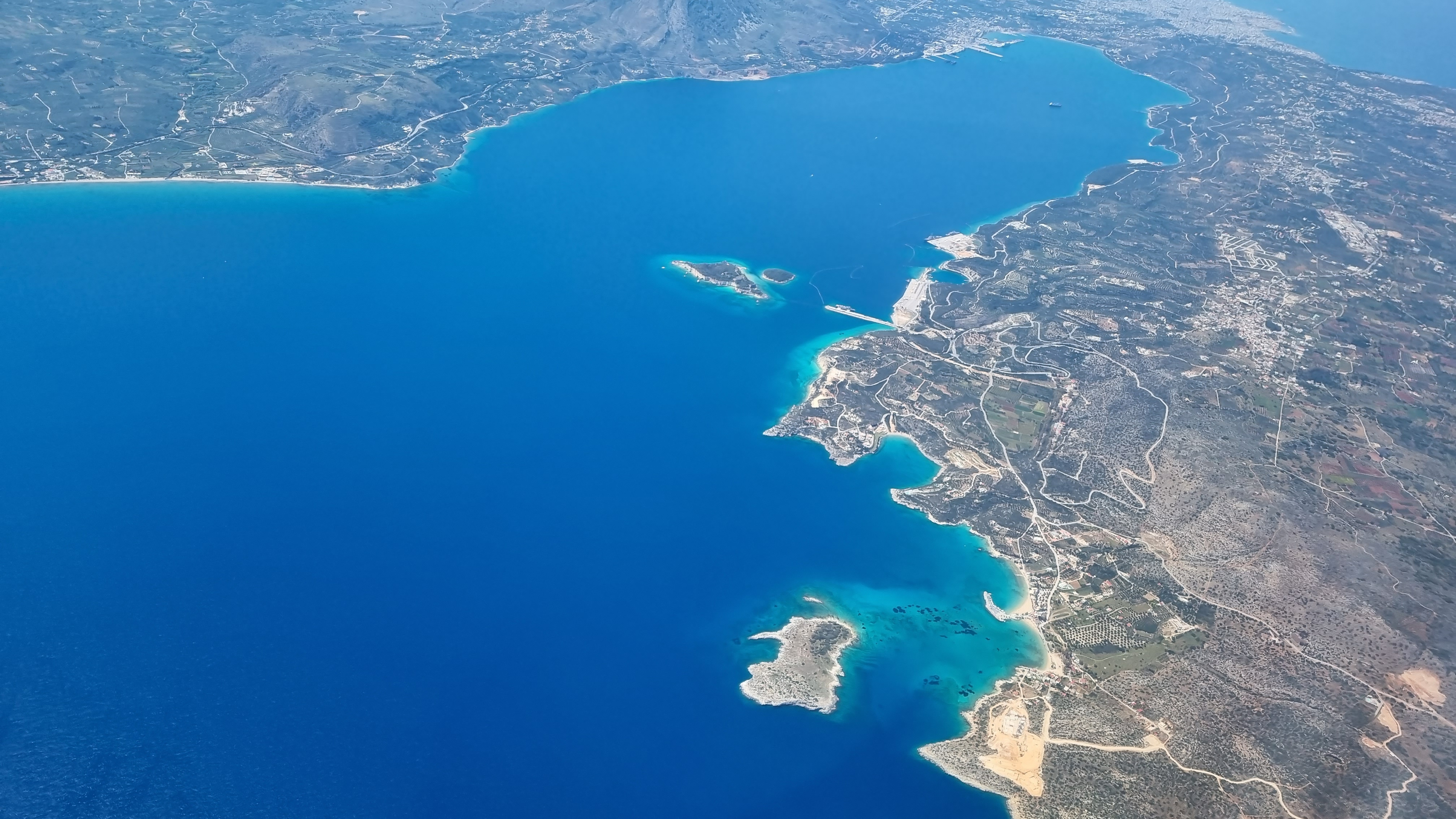
Aerial view of Souda Bay from the north-east

Ian Playfair, the British official historian of the Mediterranean campaign, wrote in 1956 that the attack was the first of Italian unconventional operation and that it took skill and bravery. The British official historian of the Royal Navy, Stephen Roskill, wrote in 1957 that the loss of York was the inevitable consequence of using a base that was not adequately defended. The poor defences there limited its use to that of an advanced fuelling station, forcing the Mediterranean Fleet to operate from Alexandria, 500 nmi (930 km; 580 mi) to the south.

In 2015, Greene and Massignani wrote that the sinking of York was the first success of the MTM which vindicated them as weapons. The six pilots were captured and an MTM was recovered undamaged; while being inspected there was an explosion, wounding a British officer and damaging the boat. The Italians claimed hits that sank another tanker and Pericles. The British reported that York and Pericles were grounded and the other MTM missed their targets, one being stranded on the beach. Anti-aircraft guns around the base opened fire under the impression that the base was under air attack. The six MTM pilots were awarded the Medaglia d'oro al valor militare.

=== Casualties ===
Two British sailors were killed on York. Faggioni, de Vito, Barberi, Cabrini, Tedeschi and Beccati were captured. The prisoners were well treated at first, Faggioni recalling that a British sailor said, "Good job, isn't it?" Later, Faggioni and his men were subjected to a mock firing squad, with an officer holding a black bandage in his hand. The prisoners were then taken back to prison.

==== Axis controversy ====
The Regia Marina and the Luftwaffe argued over the credit for the sinking of York but the matter was resolved by British records and by the York war log, recovered by Italian naval officers, who boarded the half-sunk cruiser after the capture of Crete. A message from Portal, the captain to his Chief Engineering Officer read,

Please take statements from all men who were in boiler and engine rooms when the ship was struck on the 26th, also from any men who can bear witness as to the R.A.s who were lost, being in the engine room. I would like you also to make rough notes now, while events are fresh in your mind, of sequence of damage reports and appreciations as time went on. Also a log of events since we started pumping out. R.P.

In 1957, the retired admiral, Marc' Antonio Bragadin, wrote that he had gone on board York during the occupation of Crete, before the Germans arrived and recovered records which showed that York had sunk before the Luftwaffe attacked the ship. Damage on the superstructure of the ship was caused by British demolition charges rather than by Luftwaffe bombs. In 2001, David Thomas attributed the loss of York to X-MAS rather than the Germans.

=== Subsequent events ===
York was disabled and run aground but her anti-aircraft guns continued to provide air defence to the harbour. On 21 March two divers assessing damage during an air raid, were killed by a near miss. A salvage operation involving the submarine, HMS Rover, dispatched from Alexandria to assist York with electrical power, was abandoned due to the intensity of the air attacks, which damaged the submarine and forced her return to Egypt. The cruiser was evacuated and her main guns were wrecked with demolition charges by her crew before the Battle of Crete. Pericles was taken in tow by destroyers, broke in two during a storm and was sunk by gunfire on 14 April 1941 35 nmi (65 km; 40 mi) north-west of Alexandria.
