= Raid on Grand Harbour =

Part of World War II in Malta

- Part of the Battle of the Mediterranean of the Second World War
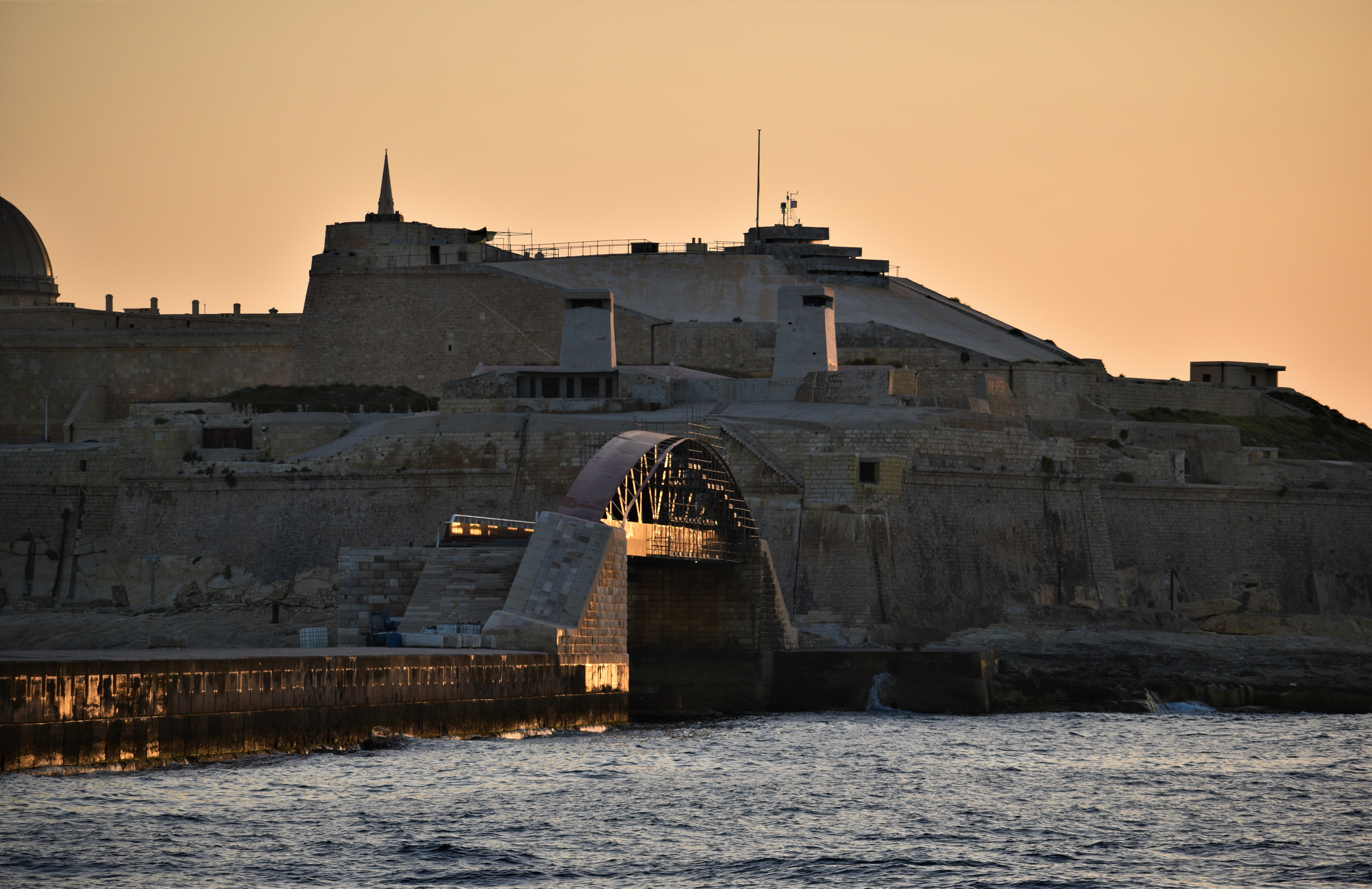
- Fort St Elmo, site of the attack, with the new bridge at the forefront, built in 2012
Date	26 July 1941
Location	Grand Harbour, Malta 35°54′07″N 14°31′08″E
Result	British victory

Belligerents
United Kingdom	Italy

Commanders and leaders
Henry Ferro	Vittorio Moccagatta †; Teseo Tesei †

Strength
Coastal defences; 30 fighter aircraft	1 Aviso; 2 MAS torpedo boats; 9 MTM explosive boats; 2 maiali (human torpedoes); 2 support boats; 10 fighter aircraft

Casualties and losses
1 fighter destroyed	17 killed; 18 (POW); 10 boats destroyed; 2 boats captured; 1 human torpedo (maiale) lost; 1 human torpedo captured; 3+fighters shot down

The Raid on Grand Harbour (Operazione MALTA-2), was an Italian raid against Allied shipping in Grand Harbour, Valletta, Malta in the early morning of 26 July 1941 during the Second World War. MTM explosive motorboat pilots and frogmen from the Decima Flottiglia Motoscafi Armati Siluranti (Decima MAS 10th Flotilla Torpedo Armed Motorboats) of the Regia Marina conducted a raid to penetrate the harbour and attack British shipping. The attackers destroyed the St Elmo Bridge trying to enter the harbour, before being driven off by fire from the coastal defences.

The Decima MAS group was killed outside the harbour by the British harbour defences during the raid, swam ashore to be taken prisoner or were killed attempting the return journey; it was the worst defeat suffered by Decima MAS in the war. Many of the two MAS-boat (Motoscafo armato silurante, torpedo-armed motorboat) crews and surviving Decima MAS men were killed when British Hurricane fighter aircraft attacked the MAS-boats on the morning of 26 July, along with two Macchi C.200 Saetta (Lightning) fighter escorts shot down in dogfights. A Hurricane was shot down and the pilot rescued from MAS-452, which was recovered and used as a tender by the British.

== Background ==
=== Decima MAS ===
The interest of the Regia Marina in small boat warfare and other mezzi insidiosi, stealth and deceit, lay dormant between 1918 and the diplomatic crisis with Britain over the Second Italo-Ethiopian War 1935–1936. In 1935 and early 1936, Captain Teseo Tesei and Captain Elios Toschi tested a human torpedo in La Spezia on the Tyrrhenian Sea and resumed testing in May. The Ethiopian defeat in 1936 ended the tests but work on assault boats continued. On 28 September 1938, Supermarina ordered the I Flottiglia MAS (1st Torpedo Motorboat Flotilla), based at La Spezia, to establish a research department (the Sezione Armi Speciali (Special Weapons Section) from 1939. The detachment had a few officers at HQ, seven at a confidential base at Bocca di Serchio for human torpedo and frogman training and another six officers to pilot the assault motorboats, of which seven had been built, plus eleven human torpedoes.

On 24 February 1940, the 1st MAS Flotilla and the Special Weapons Section was taken over by Commander Mario Giorgini and in August attempts to use the unconventional weapons began, with little success and the capture of Giorgini in October. On 23 January 1941 Commander Vittorio Moccagatta replaced Giorgini and on 15 March formed the Decima Flottiglia Motoscafi Armati Siluranti (10th Flotilla, Torpedo Armed Motorboats, Decima MAS). The new force had a HQ, including a plans office and a weapons section. The surface assault boats and the training school (Lieutenant-Commander Giorgio Giobbe) were split from the human torpedoes and other underwater weapons (Lieutenant-Commander Junio Valerio Borghese), the captain of the Italian submarine Scirè. Decima MAS remained at La Spezia and an advanced base was set up in Augusta, Sicily.

=== Raid on Souda Bay ===
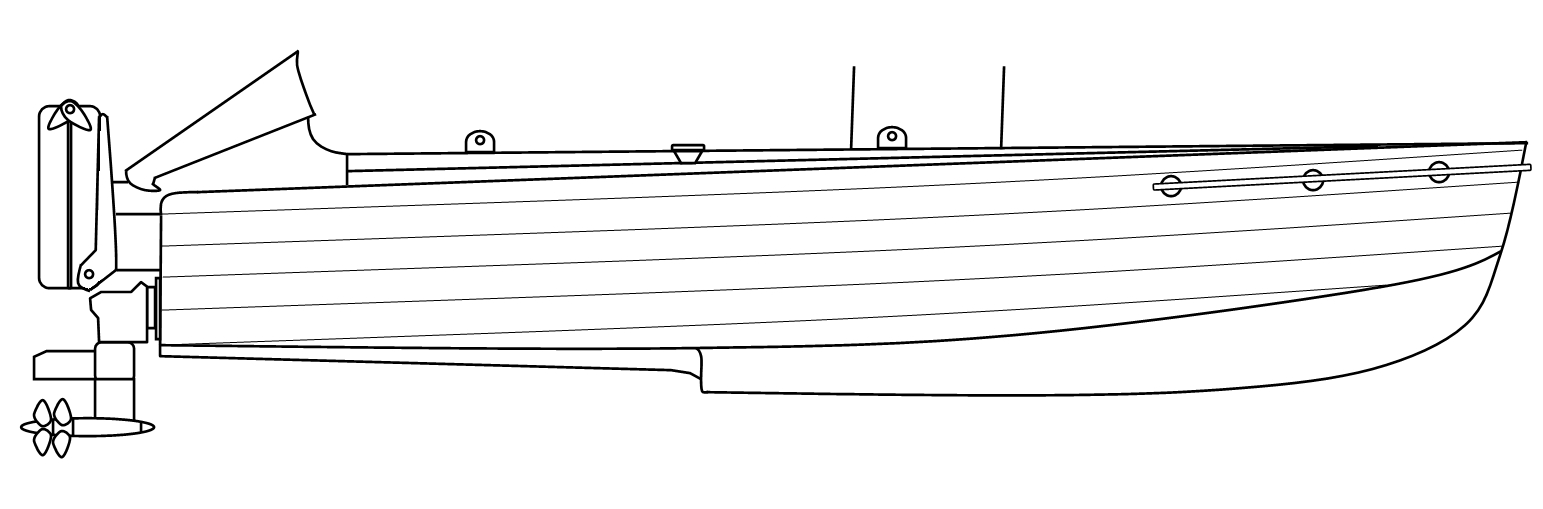
Motoscafo turismo (MT/MTM)

The Decima MAS MTMs got past a net barrage and rendezvoused near an islet in the mouth of Souda Bay, the MTM pilots using oars to move quietly. The commander called the boats together and resumed the advance towards the third net barrage, about 3 nmi (5.6 km; 3.5 mi) away. The commander, Faggioni, briefed the pilots; two were to attack the heavy cruiser York, about 1,600 ft (500 m) away; Faggioni and another MTM pilot waited in reserve in case the attack failed. Soon after 05:00, as dawn was breaking, the first two MTMs moved to about 980 ft (300 m) from York, waited for another fifteen minutes for the sky to clear, then sped towards the cruiser, the pilots abandoning their MTMs about 260 ft (80 m) from the ship. At 05:11 an officer on York heard an engine, mistook it for an aircraft and before he could raise the alarm, the ship was hit. Encouraged by this success, Decima MAS was ordered on 26 April to plan a similar attack on Grand Harbour.

=== Valetta ===
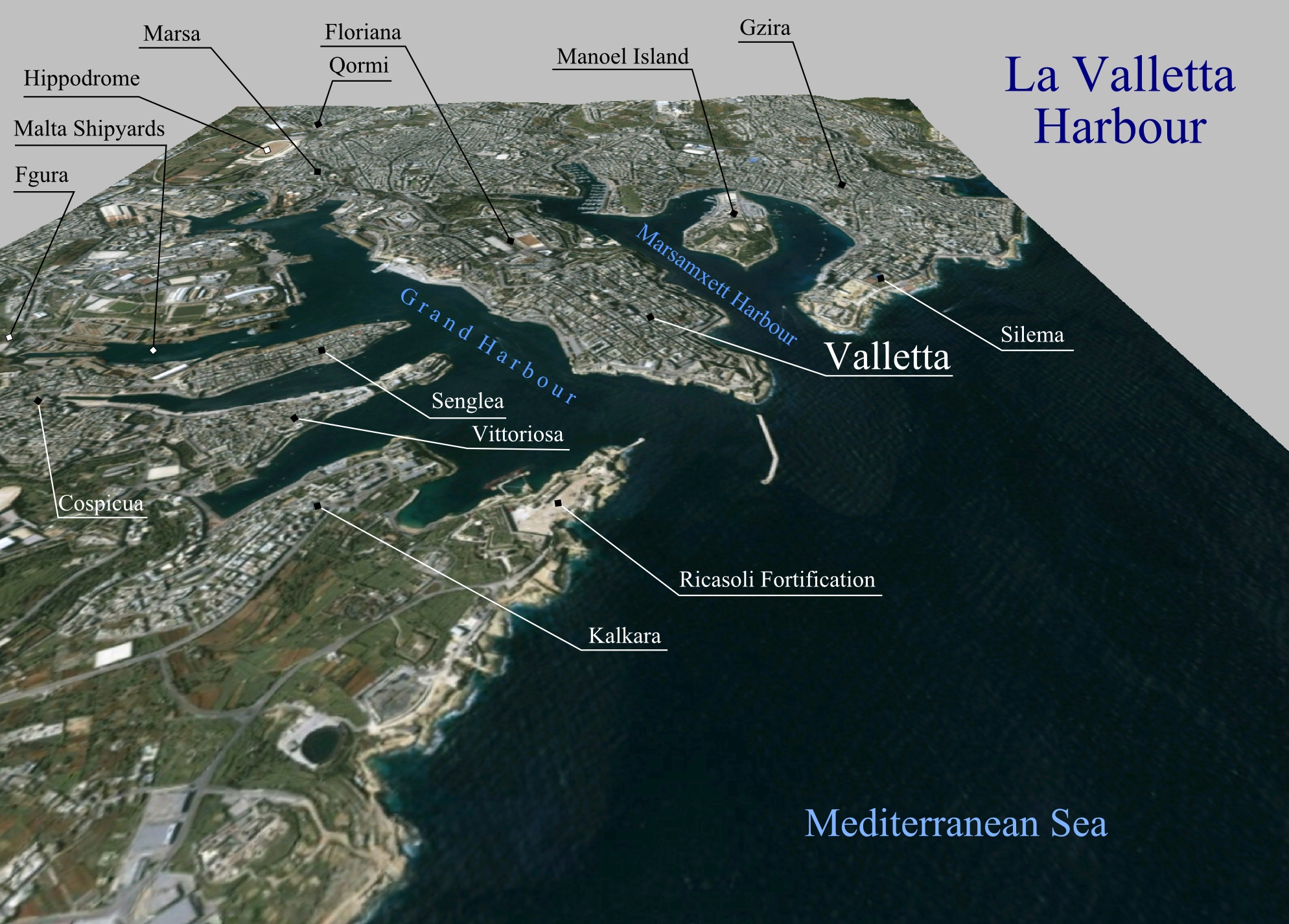
Modern image of Valetta Harbour

Valetta Harbour is bisected by a peninsula on which lies the city of Valetta. Marsamxett Harbour, to the north, housed the submarine base. Grand Harbour, to the south, the main harbour, had the main naval base and the commercial harbour. The entrance to Grand Harbour in 1941 was protected by Fort Saint Elmo at the end of the Valetta peninsula and by Fort Ricasoli at the eastern side of the entrance, with a breakwater jutting from each side. The gap between St Elmo and Ricasoli was about 500 m (550 yd). The short, eastern, breakwater ended at the rocks under Fort Ricasoli. The longer, western, breakwater had a 70 m (77 yd)-gap at the shore end under Fort St Elmo, for small craft. A bridge spanned the gap, resting on a central pylon and a steel torpedo net had been suspended from it down to the seabed. The main entrance between the breakwaters was blocked by a boom from the inner side of St Elmo to the tip of the Ricasoli-side breakwater.

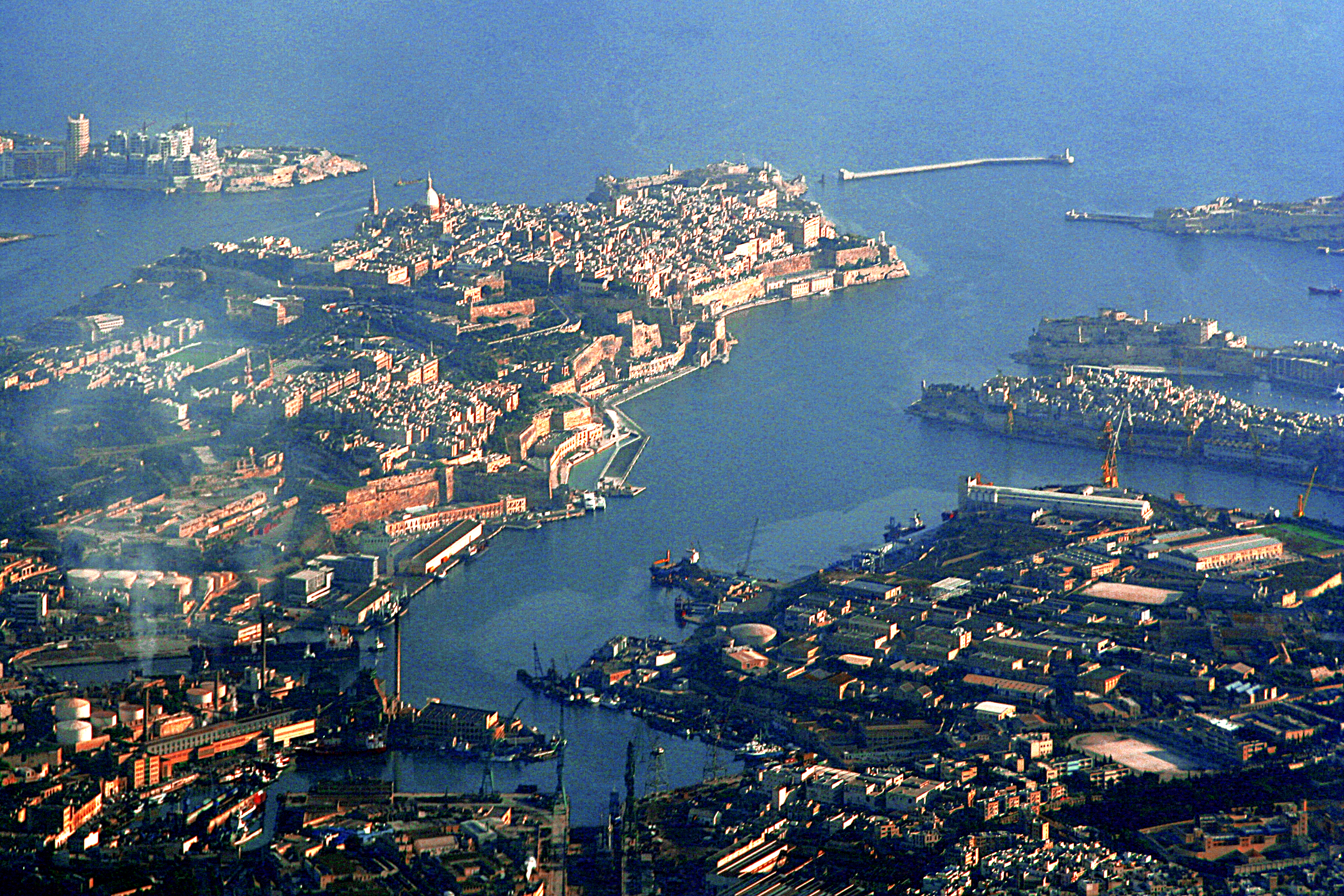
Photograph of Grand Harbour looking outwards to the breakwater

St Elmo had six twin 6-pounder guns manned by the 3rd Coastal Battery, Royal Malta Artillery (RMA, battery commander Colonel Henry Ferro) and Ricasoli had three 6-pounders manned by the 1st Coastal Battery RMA. The guns had been emplaced on the bastion walls, about 60 ft (18 m) above sea level. There were many searchlights and a machine-gun post had been built on the rocks under Ricasoli, manned by troops of the 1st Battalion, Cheshire Regiment. The entrance had been divided into zones for each 6-pounder; targets in other zones were not to be engaged unless the gun had an empty zone. The guns were a recent addition and had been intended to have a fire control director but the ship bringing it had been sunk, leaving the guns were under local control. The 6-pounders fired special anti-flash ammunition, to avoid blinding the gun-layers at night but concealing the flash produced huge clouds of smoke. (Note: In the British official history of intelligence in the Second World War (volume II, 1981) Harry Hinsley wrote that Ultra did not give a warning of the attack. Greene and Massignani (2002) noted the claim in Hinsley and wrote that Ralph Bennett (1989) in "Ultra and Mediterranean Strategy 1941–1945" was silent on the subject. Shores, Cull and Malizia in "Ultra: The Hurricane Years, 1940–41" (1987) have the defences being alerted by Ultra decodes, which Greene and Massignani accepted as true.)

=== Operazione MALTA-1 ===
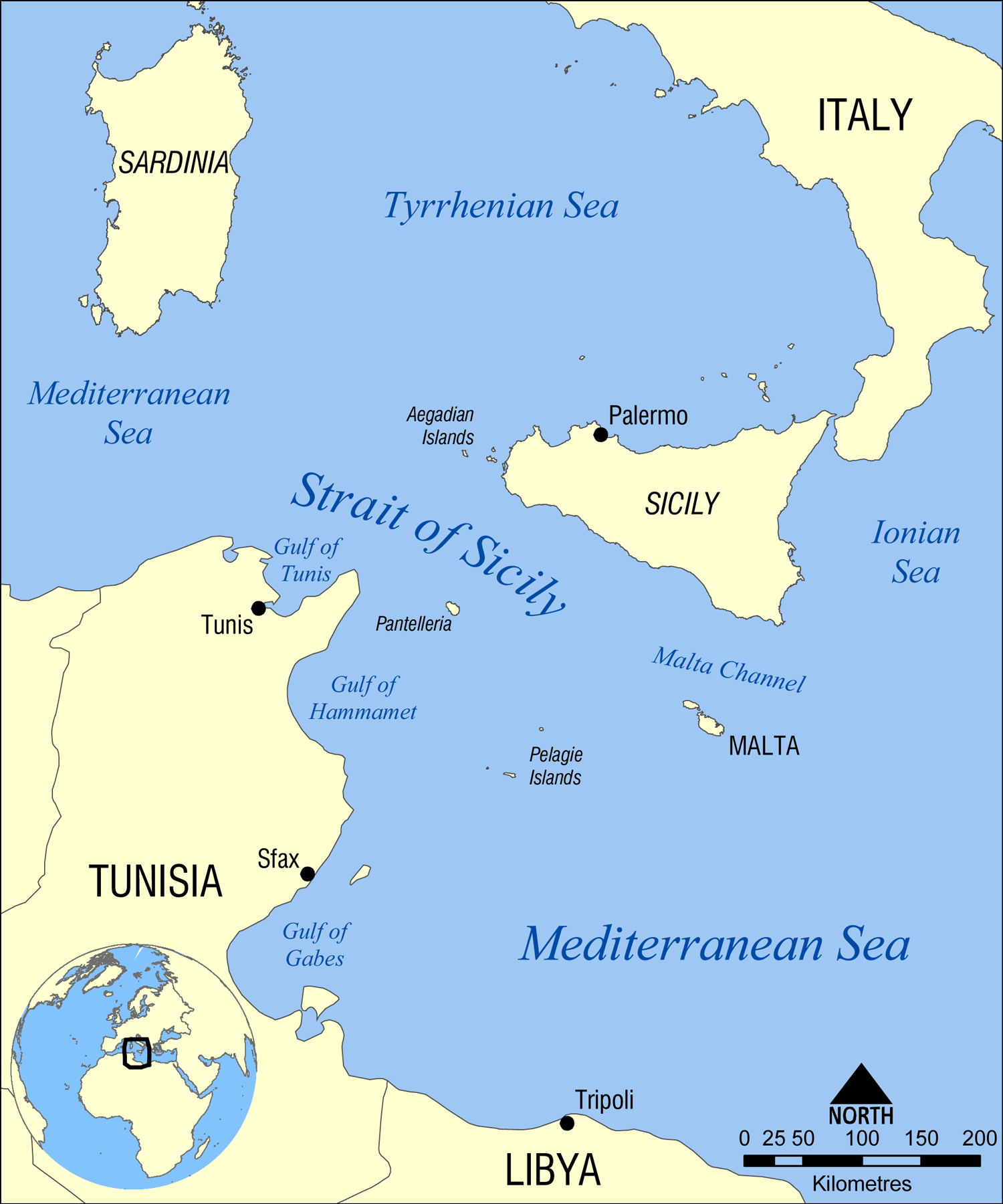
Map of the Strait of Sicily

Reconnaissances were conducted off Valletta during the nights of 25/26 and 27/28 May, with encouraging results, the MAS had approached within 4 nmi (7.4 km; 4.6 mi) of Valletta, with the Malta coast defences apparently quiescent. Supermarina postponed an attack on 30 May and Decima MAS was ordered to wait until the next new moon in towards the end of June 1941. The attack was given the code-name Operazione MALTA-1 Another reconnaissance by MAS boats during the night of 25/26 June came within 3 km (1.6 nmi; 1.9 mi) without alerting the shore defences, leading the Decima MAS to look on the attack with greater optimism. Operazione MALTA-1 departed from an advanced base at Augusta in Sicily on the afternoon of 27 June with five MAS towing nine MTM; a MTS and a MTM were towed by MAS-452. Two MTM each were towed by MAS-451, -509, -556 and -562. Rough seas swamped an MTM and the force turned back.

Another attempt with eight MTM was made on 29/30 June. MAS-452 towed the MTS and the other MAS towed two MTM apiece. The weather was too rough and a damaged MTM was sent back to Augusta, towed by its MAS, the other MTM being taken over by MAS-452. The weather abated after night fell but at 21:00 one of the MTM tow cables broke and the MTM engine failed, making it impossible to catch up for the tow to be rejoined. After an hour of fruitless attempts to get the engine going, it was scuttled at 22:00 and the mission was resumed. Only five minutes after resuming the journey, one of the MAS suffered an engine failure and took twenty minutes to get going, by when it was too late to attack before dawn. The raiders reversed course and the attack was postponed again, until new moon period the end of July.

== Prelude ==
=== Plan, MALTA-2 ===
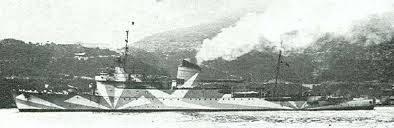
The Italian aviso Diana, photographed on 1 June 1942

For the next attempt on Grand Harbour, the attack was re-named Operazione MALTA-2. The attack was scheduled for the night of 25/26 July 1941. The earlier operations had shown that MTM could not make the sea crossing to Malta and the number of MAS was reduced to MAS-451 and MAS-452. The aviso Diana was to tow the MTL and carry the nine MTM and an MTS. Getting into the harbour was made easier by adding two maiali, carried by the MTL, for surprise. A maiale was to explode a charge against the torpedo net at 04:30 and the MTM would pass in line-ahead through the 6 ft 7 in (2 m) gap in the inner-boom.

Once through the boom, the MTM would speed into the harbour, to attack ships at their moorings and the other maiale would attack the submarines at Marsamxett Creek. Small air raids at 02:30 and 04:15 on Valletta by the Regia Aeronautica would be useful navigational aids to Decima MAS. The third air raid was to be a bigger effort, just inland from Valletta, at 04:30 to serve as a diversion when Decima MAS attacked. It was hoped that the noise of the British anti-aircraft guns would mask approaching boats. At 05:30 fighters would take-off from Comiso in Sicily, to escort the returning boats. A MAS reconnaissance sortie off Malta during the night of 23/24 July closed to within 1.2 mi (2 km) of the coast. Four searchlights scanned the sea but missed the MAS, which made its way slowly back northwards to safety.

=== Operazione MALTA-2 ===
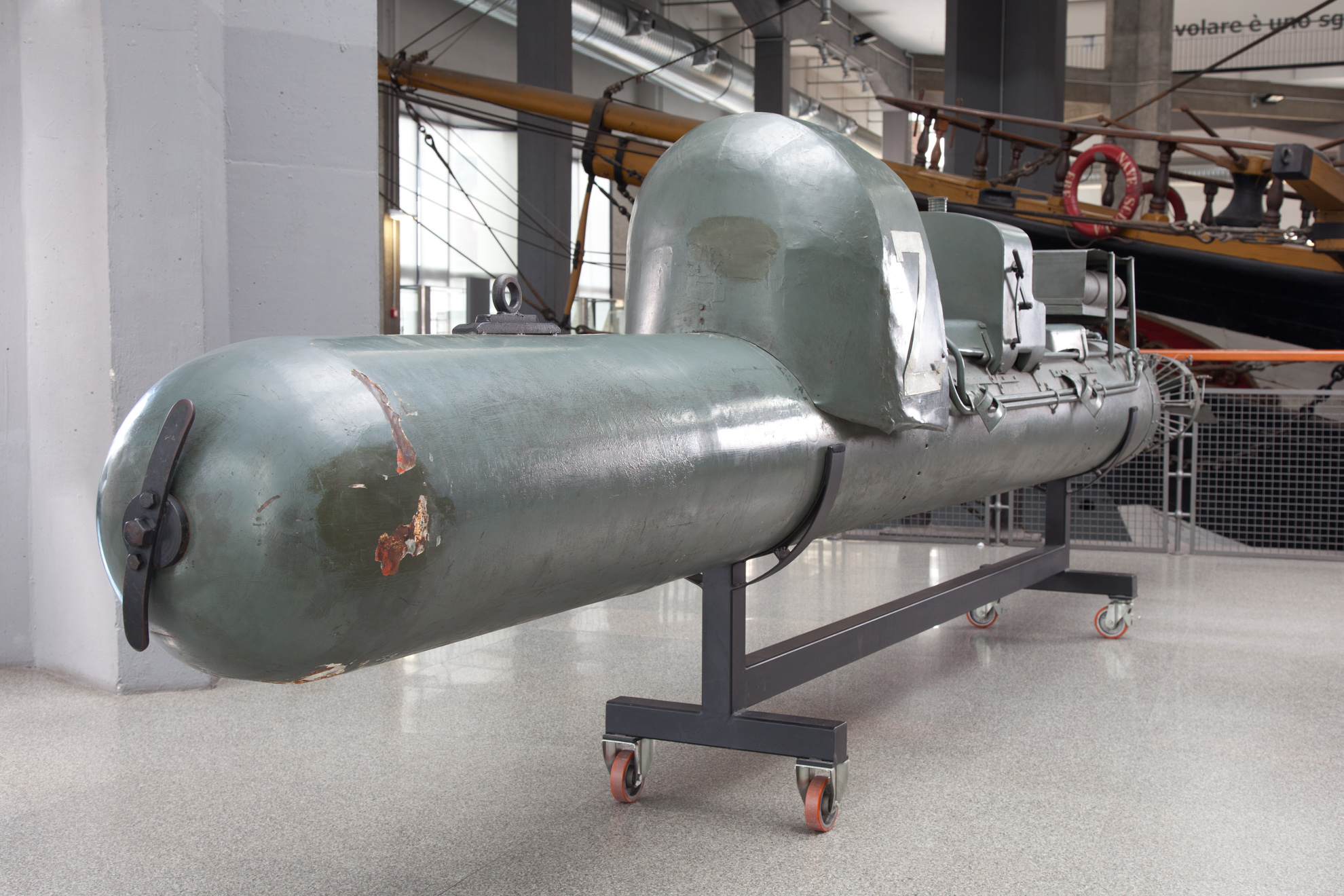
Human torpedo (Maiale), at the Museo nazionale della scienza e della tecnologia Leonardo da Vinci, Milan.

On 24 June, Convoy GM 1 from Operation Substance arrived at Malta, guaranteeing that Grand Harbour would contain plenty of targets. Nineteen men of Decima MAS and 2 MAS with 13 crew each, left Augusta at 18:15 on 25 July 1941, with Diana, MAS-451 and MAS-452, nine MTM, a small 2-man MTS command/navigational boat and an MTL loaded with the two Maiali. Diana towed the MTL and carried the MTM and the MTS with MAS-451 and MAS-452 close by. The weather was perfect, with a slight north-westerly breeze and a calm sea. Moccagatta was in command in MAS-452 and Giobbe commanded the MTM and directed the attack from the MTS. At 23:00 hours on 25 July, at Point C 17 nmi (32 km) north of Valletta, Diana stopped, launched the MTS and the MTM, which took about an hour; an MTM was damaged. At midnight Diana turned northwards for Sicily, to await the MAS off Cape Passero.

The MAS escorted the MTM, MAS-451 towing the MTL; hardly had the tow begun when the tow rope fouled the propeller of MAS-451 and the boats collided; one of the maiali might have been damaged but not noticed at the time. Trying to free the propeller of MAS-451 was fruitless and after an hour, the crew was ordered back to Sicily. Decima MAS pressed on but the delay had been serious; MAS-452 took over the tow of the MTL. Moccagatta got the boats moving faster than planned, the damaged MTM dropped back and had to be scuttled, the pilot, Montanari, going aboard MAS-452. After half an hour MAS-451 turned up, the crew having freed the propeller. The first raid by the Regia Aeronautica at 01:45 did not appear and just after 02:00 on 26 July Decima MAS reached Point B, 4.3 nmi (8 km) north of Valletta, not the planned arrival at 01:34. The MAS stopped and the eight MTM, led by Giobbe in the MTS, sailed southwards towards Valletta, in line-ahead at 5 kn (9.3 km/h; 5.8 mph), the maximum speed of the MTL, which reduced the wakes and noise of the boat engines.

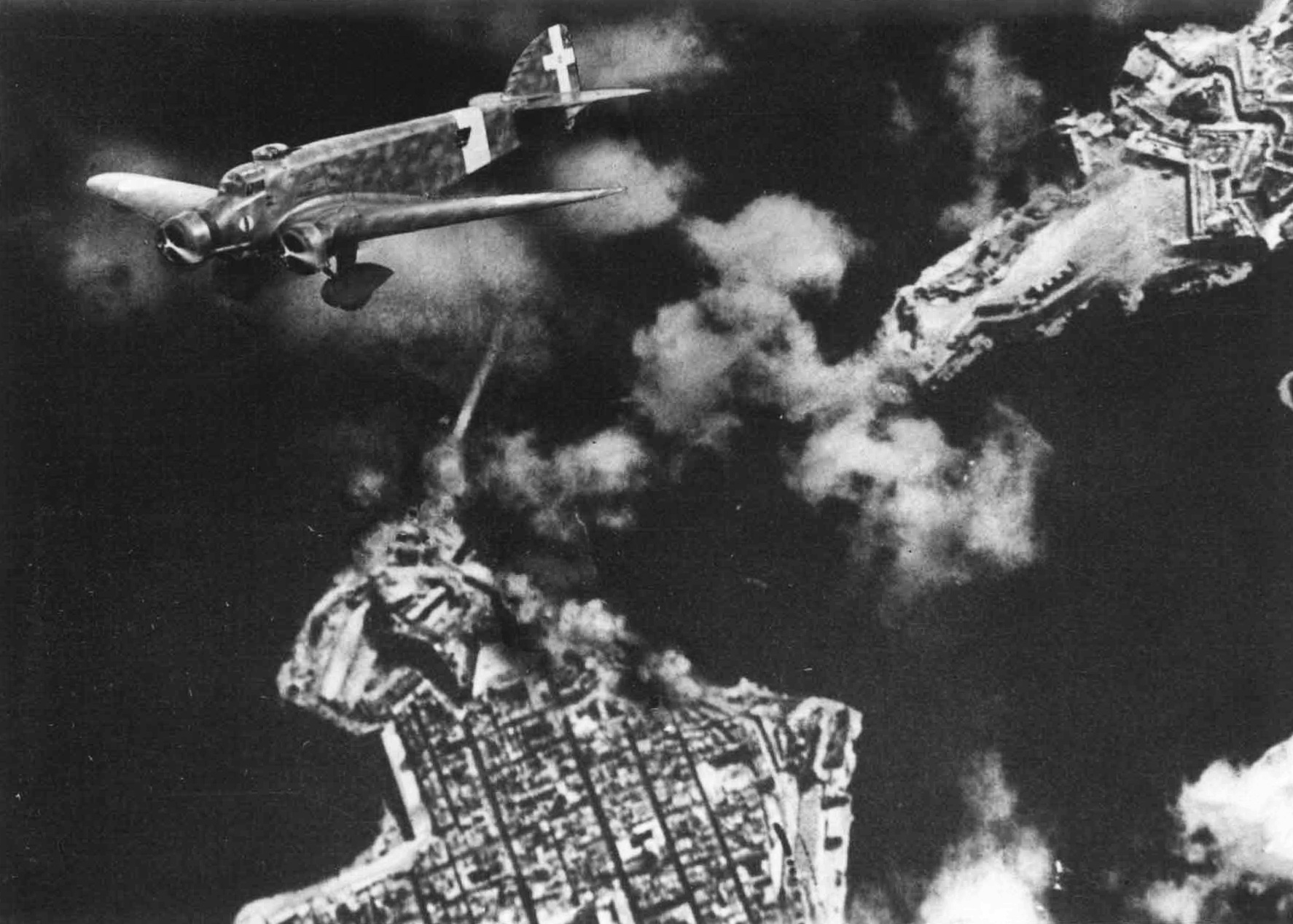
An Italian Savoia-Marchetti SM.81 Pipistrello over Fort Ricasoli and Fort St Elmo in 1941

The Italian force had been detected by radar several hours earlier; a temperature inversion, which makes radar waves curve over the horizon, had extended the radar range from Malta. At 22:30 hours on 25 July, 502 RAF Radar station, at Fort Madliena, detected a strong echo 39 nmi (72 km) to the north-east, the defences were alerted and gun crews closed up. The echo faded at 23:00 and around midnight it moved northwards towards Sicily, leaving behind a small indeterminate echo, which faded away as the strong echo moved out of range. The gun crews and searchlight personnel were stood-down but had to stay close by their equipment. The men slept in the gun emplacements, guns loaded and the searchlights were also held at 30-second readiness, directed to create an illuminated area in front of the harbour entrance. The guns at Fort St Elmo and Fort Ricasoli remained ready for action and at 02:45 an Italian aircraft flew north-west to south-east over Malta and bombed over 3 mi (4.8 km) from Valletta.

== Attack ==
=== Approach to Valetta ===
Shortly after 03:00 hours the Italians reached Point A, about 0.62 mi (1 km) off the St Elmo headland. The MTS and the eight MTM stopped there and the MTL moved another 660 ft (200 m) closer to Fort St Elmo. The maiali were launched but this took a long time and the Italians found that the maiale for Marsaxxlox Harbour was down by the stern, probably because of the earlier collision between the MTL and MAS-451. Tesei, the pilot of the other maiale, spent half an hour trying to make repairs. Tesei gave up for lack of time and ordered Costa to scuttle it and return to the MTL. Tesei was unable to begin the attack until 03:45, about an hour late. Because of the approaching dawn and the air raid diversion, cutting the St Elmo net could not be delayed beyond 04:30, leaving Tesei 45 minutes to plant his explosive charge. There was barely time to reach the bridge and no time to detach the fuze and get away. Tesei told Costa,

The net must be blown-up at 04:30 and it will be blown-up. If I am late, I will explode it instantaneously.

Tesei had to advance to about 330 ft (100 m) off Fort St Elmo on the surface, then dive to conduct the attack. Tesei began his approach but there was an offshore westerly current and the maiale had drifted eastwards during the delay, considerably lengthening the journey beyond 04:30. Costa, having taken no notice of the order to retire, took his damaged maiale quietly and erratically towards Marsamxett Harbour. The MTL was standing by, waiting to rescue the crews and carry them to the MAS. The large diversionary air-raid was carried out at 04:13 by two aircraft, far earlier than scheduled, serving only to rouse the defenders.

=== St Elmo Bridge ===
The eight MTM clustered around the MTS, 0.54 nmi (1 km) offshore, waiting in the morning mist for the explosion signalling that the way was clear as the current pushed the MTM eastwards, too subtly for the pilots to notice. At 04:12 Giobbe moved 0.27 nmi (500 m) closer to the shore, moving so slowly that it took eight minutes. At 04:30, the MTM pilots were still waiting for the explosion and Giobbe told Frassetto to destroy the net, with Carabelli to back him up in case of problems. The two boats headed southwards to reach the St Elmo headland but the pilots were surprised to find themselves off Fort Ricasoli, well to the east. They turned and motored slowly to the north-west and were ready to attack just after 04:45. Frassetto aimed at the net but to retain surprise for as long a time as possible, he did not accelerate to full power. About 160 ft (50 m) short of the net he jumped and the boat hit the net with insufficient impact to break off the bow, which got trapped in the net. Carabelli set his fuze to impact and did not jump, his MTM exploding on impact, setting off the charge in the other MTM and killing Carabelli, at about 04:48 hours. The blast of the double explosion on the surface of the sea, rather than at depth, destroyed the net and brought down one of the bridge spans, filling the passage with wreckage, making an even worse obstacle.

=== Harbour forts ===
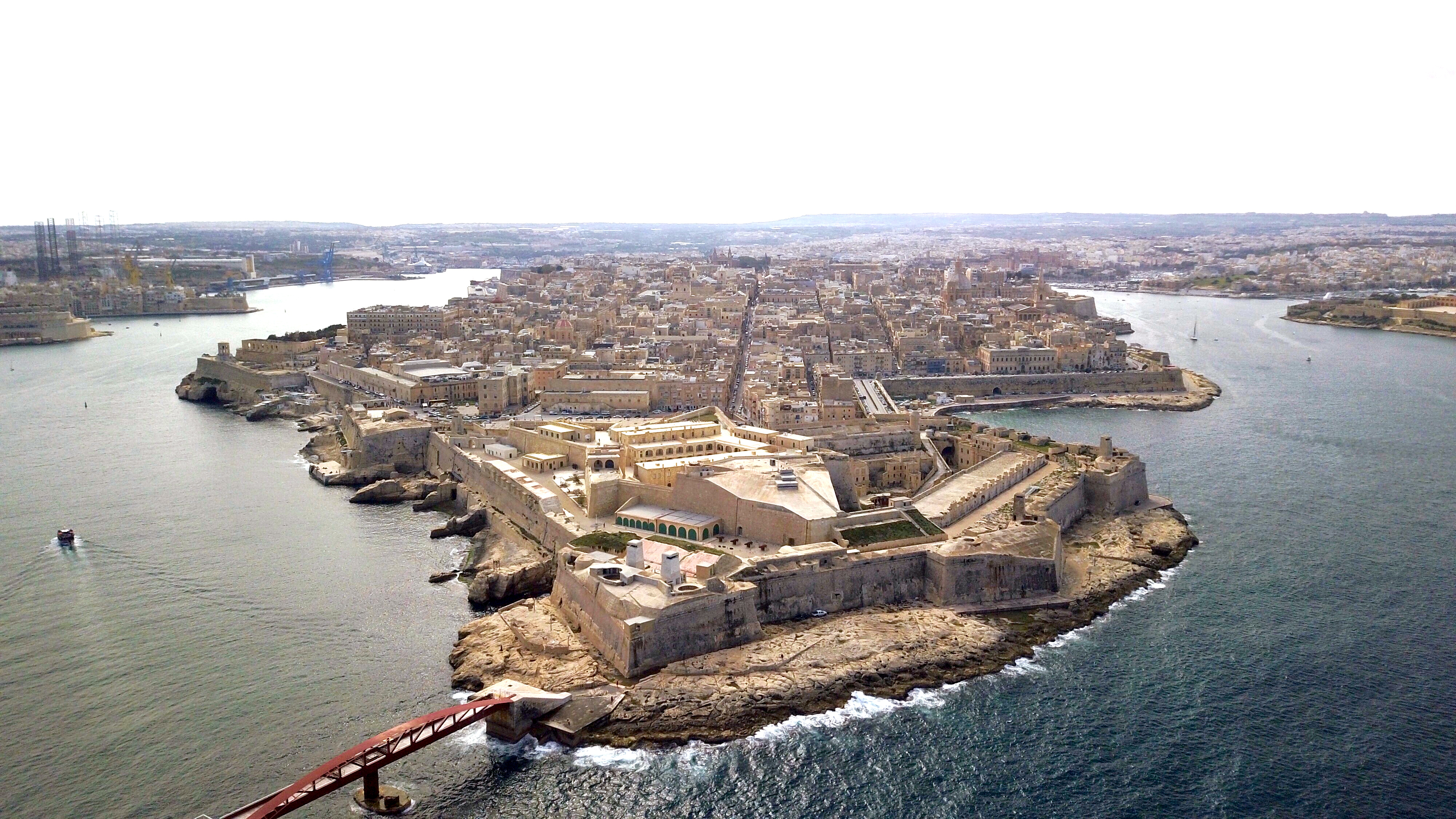
Fort St Elmo, with the new bridge visible, lower left

The fort garrisons had not seen the first MTM attack and only realised that something was up when they heard Carabelli revving his engine and then the explosion under the bridge. The 6-pounders were ready but it took thirty seconds for the searchlights to warm up. A few seconds after the explosion, Gunner Zammit, with G gun, on Fort St Elmo, spotted movement in the water. The movement resembled a very small wake or bow-wave moving slowly across his line of sight towards the bridge. Zammit fired one round at about 300 yd (270 m), triggering an explosion. The pilots of the MTM did not know that their route was still blocked and raced towards the explosion, being surprised that it seemed off to the right and not ahead, because of the current. Bosio was followed by Marchisio, Follieri, Pedrini, Zaniboni and Capriotti in line astern. The first five boats were to attack moored shipping and Capriotti was to intercept any harbour protection launches that tried to intervene.

The MTM raced to the south-west which, due to the current was further than planned. The water outside the harbour entrance was suddenly lit with searchlight beams. After a few seconds a bright white bow-wave of a small fast-moving boat entered lit area to its north-east. A second bow-wave followed and then others until six boats in line-ahead could be seen heading towards the St Elmo bridge. Every gun that could be brought to bear, three of the six 6-pounders on Fort St. Elmo, the three on fort Ricasoli and the machine-guns of the 1st Cheshire on the Ricasoli foreshore, opened fire. Bosio reached the bridge, only to find the entrance blocked and veered away, blinded by the searchlights and shell explosions. Two MTM were destroyed before they reached the bridge. The gunfire lasted for about two minutes then, at about 04:52 ceased as no more targets could be seen. E, F and G guns at Fort St Elmo each claimed an MTM and the Cheshires one but only two MTM had been sunk. The plan was for the MTM pilots to steer north and regroup if the harbour could not be entered. In the fire, smoke and water splashes, four pilots managed to steer northwards into the dark, benefiting from a light sea mist.

=== Rally ===
Bosio had run a short distance under fire and escaped. Marchisio, following, received more fire, was wounded and his MTM damaged. The MTMs, piloted by Follieri and Pedrini were destroyed and both pilots wounded but they managed to swim ashore. Zaniboni, the fifth MTM and Capriotti the sixth, were near the edge of the illuminated area when the firing started and escaped into the dark, Capriotti under machine-fire from the Cheshires. Giobbe, waiting in the MTS, realised that disaster was upon them and waited for surviving MTMs but none appeared. Not long after 05:00, dawn having broken, Giobbe ordered the MTL to withdraw and he went at full speed towards the MAS at Point B. Bosio stopped his MTM about 4,900 ft (1,500 m), north-west of Fort St Elmo, to rally the MTMs but only Zaniboni appeared. They saw a stopped boat and moved towards it, only to find that it was a buoy. A searchlight from the Sliema Batteries came to rest on the two MTM, the Fort San Rocco gunners immediately opened fire and the MTM pilots got quickly out of the way into the darkness. Bosio told Zaniboni that the entrance was blocked and he was going to find something to attack outside the harbour. He offered fuel to Zaniboni to get him back to Sicily but Zaniboni decided to stay. Capriotti stopped his MTM about 800 m (870 yd) north of Fort St Elmo, found no other MTM and decided to penetrate the harbour by himself.

Capriotti steered slowly through the mist to the south-west and eventually saw that he was close to the shore, west of Fort St Elmo. He turned east at creeping speed, hoping that the MTM would look like a wreck drifting on the current. When opposite the entrance, he was going to dash through it, unaware that it was blocked. He came across a drifting MTM and Marchisio in the water nearby, wounded. Near the bridge, Capriotti saw that the entrance was blocked and decided to scuttle both MTMs. The MTMs had been seen on the edge of the search-lit area and the gunners had assumed that they had been abandoned and held their fire, wanting to capture them. Around 05:20 Capriotti's manoeuvre was spotted, his MTM was coned by the searchlights and the 6-pounders "D", "E", "F" and "G" at Fort St Elmo, the three at Fort Ricasoli, Bofors 40 mm anti-aircraft guns on the forts, those on Fort Tigné and the Cheshire machine-gunners opened fire. Capriotti took rapid evasive action and with shells exploding all around, jumped overboard, just before his MTM was hit and exploded. Marchisio's stationary MTM was also destroyed, all in under a minute. Capriotti swam over to Marchisio, who was semi-conscious, prevented from drowning only by his lifebelt and got him ashore.

=== Pursuit ===
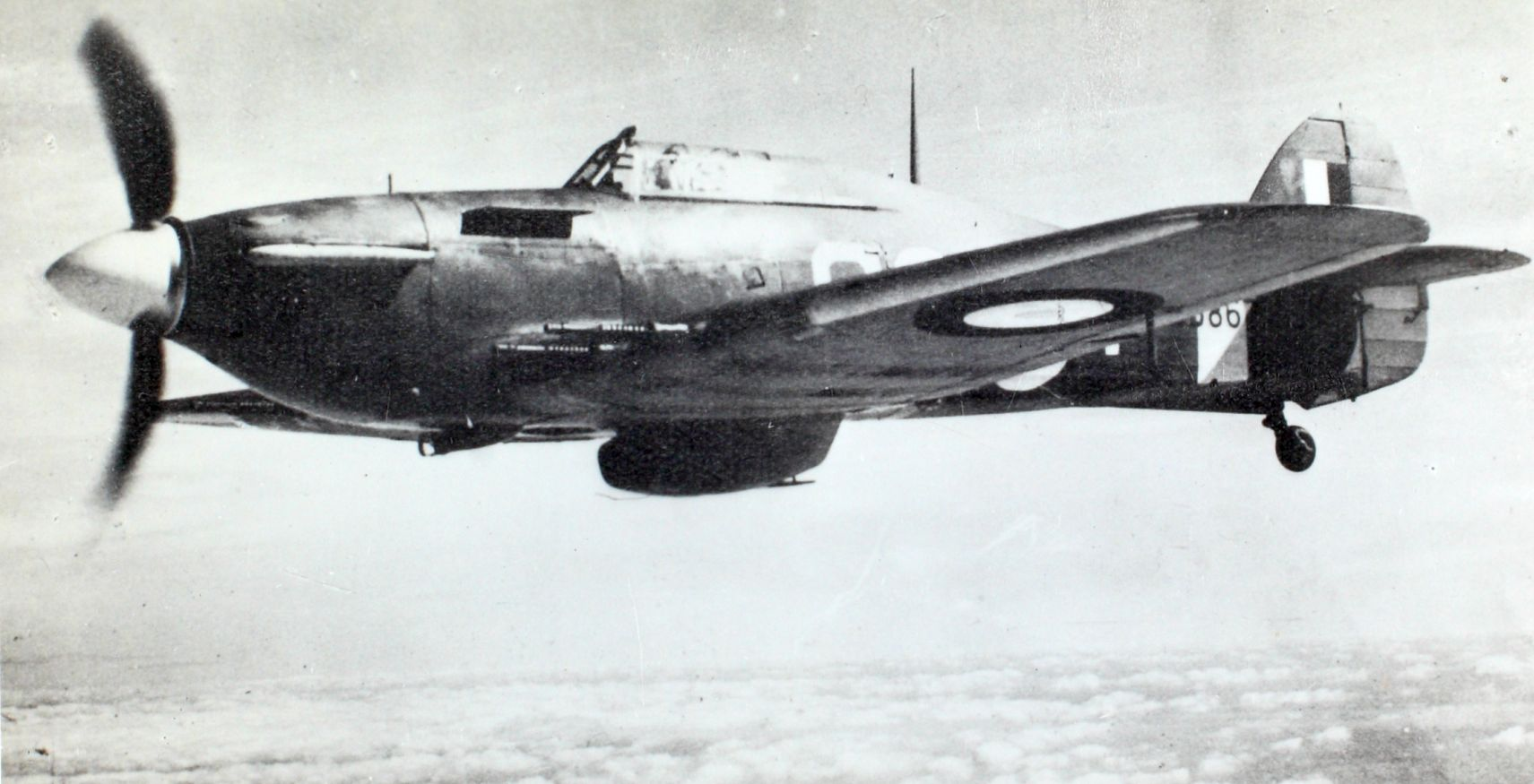
Example of a cannon-armed Hurricane

Shortly after 05:30, thirty Hurricanes of 126 Squadron and 185 Squadron took to the air to finish off the Italian boats but headed north when Italian aircraft were reported approaching from Sicily. One fighter strafed MAS-452 as she approached Malta and eight fighters attacked Bosio and Zaniboni in their MTM with machine guns and cannon-fire near the buoy. Both pilots raced their MTM in irregular circles but Bosio was soon wounded and his boat stopped. Zaniboni fell or jumped from his MTM, which continued to circle until it was hit and stopped. After the fighters had flown away, Bosio set the destruct mechanism of his boat and died in the explosion. Zaniboni scuttled his MTM and swam ashore to surrender. Shortly before 06:00, MAS-452 was about 5 km (2.7 nmi) off St Elmo and lingered for a few minutes, watching for survivors. At about 06:00, the MAS was spotted from St Elmo and 6-pounder "E" fired a shot, despite the MAS being beyond the 5,500 yd (5,000 m)-range of the gun. The shell fell short, ricocheted off the surface of the sea and hit MAS-452 in the wheelhouse. The captain, Parodi, his helmsman, Moccagatta, Giobbe, Falcomata (surgeon), Montanari (pilot of the scuttled MTM), Constantini and Zocchi (MTS crew), were killed.

The eleven survivors, fearing that MAS-452 was about to founder, got into the MTS, sped towards Sicily and rendezvoused with Diana, which was waiting for the returning boats off Cape Passero. MAS-451 was en route to Sicily with ten Saettas of 7° Gruppo overhead. At 05:50, the Hurricanes arrived and a dogfight began. Two Saettas were shot down, one pilot, Avellina De Mattia, was rescued but Ruggero Gallina was killed. Another Hurricane formation flew north and at about 06:20, attacked MAS-451, about 36 nmi (67 km; 41 mi) north-east of Malta. A Hurricane was shot down by a Saetta, the MAS was set on fire, three more of the crew members were killed and nine survivors abandoned ship, which blew up at about 06:40. Paratore, in the MTL, had waited for longer for the maiali, drifting much further east on the current. When Paratore decided to return, he was undone by the slow speed of the MTL. At about 06:40, he was spotted 6 nmi (11 km; 6.9 mi) north-east of Grand Harbour and returning Hurricanes were instructed to attack.

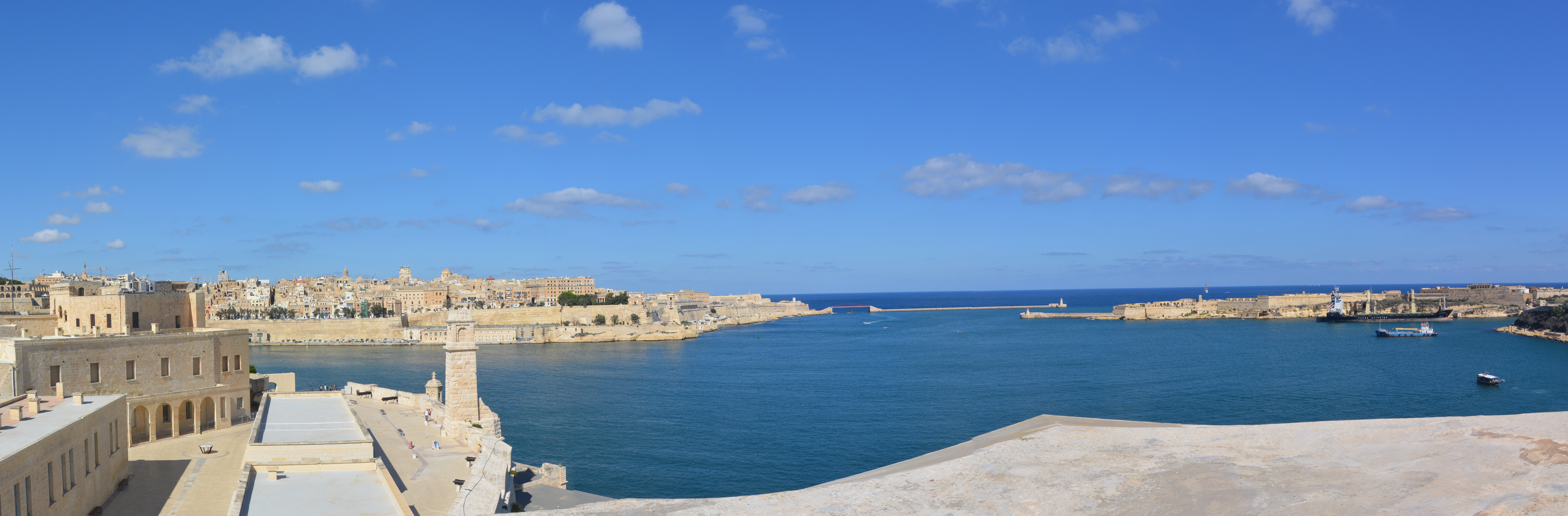
Looking out to sea, Fort St Elmo on the left and Fort Ricasoli to the right

A 6-pounder round fired from Fort St Rocco directed the Hurricanes towards the MTL, which attacked, wounded Paratore and sank the MTL. A civilian RASC launch went out and rescued the nine survivors of MAS-541 and Paratore. As the launch approached MAS-452, someone waved the Italian flag and the launch was ordered back to Grand Harbour. Around noon, a Swordfish floatplane landed near MAS-452 and found Pilot Officer Denis Winton, from the shot down Hurricane. Winton had paddled his dinghy towards Malta for a few hours and came across MAS-452, which he boarded only to find the bodies of eight Italian sailors. He waved the flag to attract the attention of the rescue launch but this had backfired. MAS-452 was towed to Malta by Jade and a drifting MTM was towed in, perhaps that piloted by Zaniboni.

==== Maiali ====
Tesei might have fallen behind, pressed on and been killed by Carabelli's MTM explosion. It might be that the small wave shot at by "G" gun at Fort St Elmo, between Carabelli's explosion and the lighting of the searchlights, was Tesei. Joseph Caruana (1991) thought that destruction by "G" gun was the most likely explanation. If this is true, Tesei took far longer than expected and was a considerable distance away from the bridge when Carabelli's MTM exploded. Feeling the explosion, Tesei might have surfaced under the guns of St Elmo inadvertently, the shell from "G" gun exploding the charge on the maiale. A breathing mask with human remains was found in the water next morning. Costa missed the entrance to Marsamxett Harbour and got lost off the north-west coast until 08:00, when his maiale broke down for good. Costa and Baria swam ashore about 3 mi (4.8 km) north-west of Valletta and surrendered, their maiale being salvaged later by the British.

== Aftermath ==
=== Analysis ===
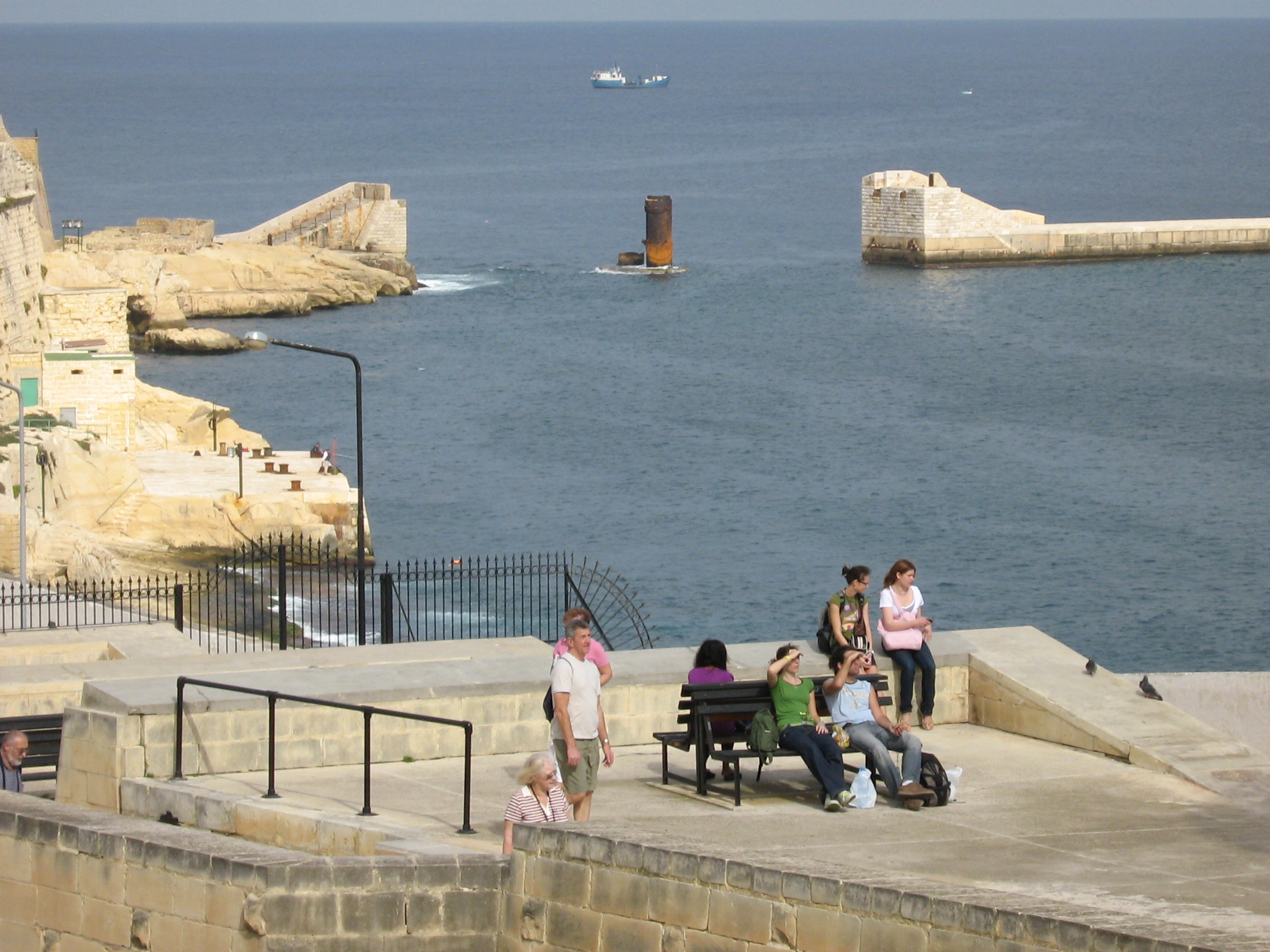
The remains of St. Elmo Bridge in Valletta, destroyed in the attack of 26 July 1941

In 1957, the British naval official historian, Stephen Roskill, wrote that the harbour defences were alert and that the attacking force was destroyed, having achieved nothing. In the same year, Marcantonio Bragadin wrote that the raid was the worst and most costly defeat of the special assault units in the war but that "defeat though it was, it must certainly be considered a glorious one". In 2002, Greene and Massignani wrote that the attack became known as a 'glorious failure' in Italian writing. The British Ultra code-breakers gave a warning of the attack, the approach of Diana was revealed by radar and mechanical failures blighted the mission.

The destruction of the bridge blocked the harbour more effectively than the nets and the British destroyed or captured the MTM and a MAS. In 2003, Richard Woodman wrote that the "bold Italian plan had entirely and literally misfired: not only had they rendered...the entrance completely impassable but their approach had been detected and monitored by radar"; he called the attack an abject failure. In 2009, Vincent O'Hara called the attack a fiasco because the collapsing of the bridge created an obstacle greater than the torpedo nets used to close the channel.

=== Casualties ===
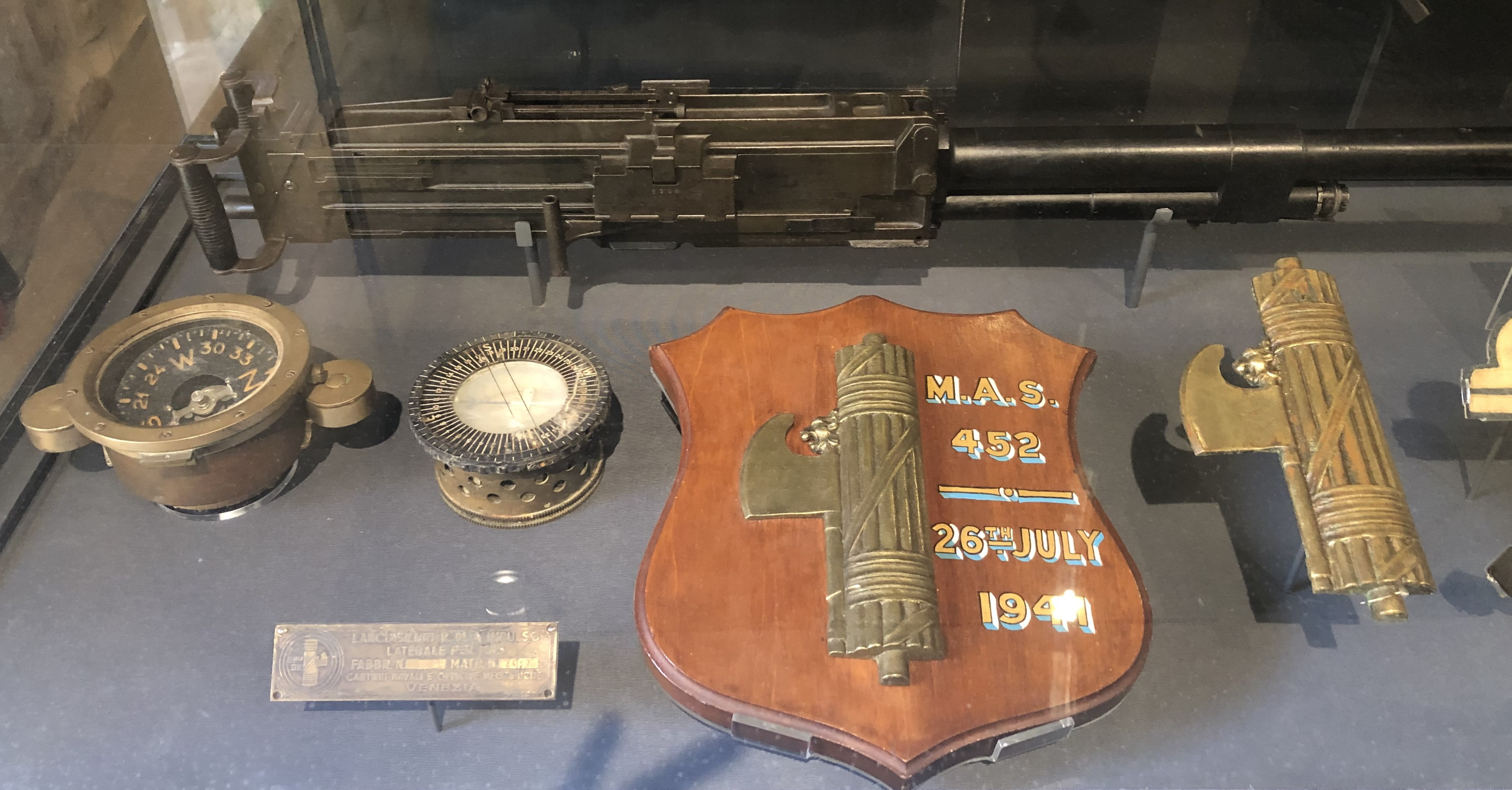
A display of captured Italian equipment at the National War Museum in Valletta.

None of the 19 Decima MAS personnel escaped; 10 were killed and nine were captured. Of the 26 MAS crew, six were killed, nine were captured, and 11 escaped to Italy where one later died of wounds. One Regia Aeronautica pilot was killed. All the MTM, maiali and two Saettas were lost, only the MTS returning to Sicily. The British lost one Hurricane fighter and captured MAS-452, which was towed in by the trawler Jade, a drifting MTM and Costa's maiale. The MAS was renamed X-MAS and used as a tender. The MTM was sent to Britain for evaluation in September 1943.

=== Subsequent operations ===
Further Decima MAS operations were delayed by the severity of its casualties at Malta. On 24 September and 21 October 1940 and again in May 1941 Decima MAS had made attempts on shipping at Gibraltar to no avail. The fourth attempt on 10 September 1941 succeeded, three human torpedoes sinking the tanker Denbydale (8,145 GRT, later refloated), a 2,444 GRT merchant ship and damaging the MV Durham (10,893 GRT). The six crewmen swam ashore and were soon flown to Italy. In December 1941 the Raid on Alexandria took place and severely damaged the battleships HMS Queen Elizabeth and HMS Valiant.
