= Mario Giorgini =

Italian naval officer during World War II

- Born: 19 March 1900; Massa, Kingdom of Italy
- Died: 23 January 1977 (aged 76); Florence, Italy
- Military career
- Allegiance: Kingdom of Italy; Italy
- Branch: Regia Marina; Italian Navy
- Rank: Fleet Admiral
- Commands: 1st MAS Flotilla; Antonio Pacinotti (submarine depot ship); Giuseppe Garibaldi (light cruiser)
- Conflicts: World War II
- Awards: Silver Medal of Military Valor; Bronze Medal of Military Valor (twice); War Merit Cross (twice); Order of Merit of the Italian Republic

Mario Giorgini (Massa, 19 March 1900 – Florence, 23 January 1977) was an Italian naval officer during World War II. He commanded the I Flottiglia MAS (later renamed Decima Flottiglia MAS), the special operations unit of the Royal Italian Navy, from February 1940 until his capture during an attempt to carry out a manned torpedo raid on Alexandria in September of the same year. After the war he became an admiral in the Marina Militare.

== Biography ==
Giorgini was born in Massa from Vittorio Giorgini and Florence Rochat. He then entered the Naval Academy of Livorno in 1914, graduating with the rank of ensign in 1920. In March 1923 he married Fiorenza Corsi, from whom he had a son, Gian Giorgio (Dido). In 1934 he was promoted to lieutenant commander, and later to commander.

On 24 February 1940, replacing his colleague Paolo Aloisi, he was appointed commander of the 1st MAS Flotilla, later briefly called the Special MAS Flotilla, the special operations unit of the Regia Marina, better known with its later name of Decima Flottiglia MAS, adopted under Giorgini's successor, Vittorio Moccagatta. While Aloisi was known for his technical expertise, Giorgini was valued for his organizational skills. It was him who chose submarines as the best means to deploy SLC manned torpedoes near enemy bases, and in May 1940 he organized and directed the first trials for the transport and release of manned torpedoes from a submarine, using Ametista as the SLC carrier and the old cruiser Quarto, moored in La Spezia, as the target. Teseo Tesei, Elios Toschi, Junio Valerio Borghese and Gino Birindelli participated in the exercise alongside Giorgini, onboard Ametista; three SLCs were released from Ametista, one of which was able to reach Quarto undetected and place a dummy charge on its hull, proving the effectiveness of the SLC. After this, Supermarina placed three submarines – Iride, Gondar and Scirè – at the disposal of the 1st MAS Flotilla.

In July 1940 Admiral Raffaele de Courten, Giorgini's superior, ordered him to select his best four crews and launch an attack on the capital ships of the Mediterranean Fleet moored in Alexandria. After vainly protesting that his men were not yet ready for action, Giorgini set out to carry out the order; but the operation, codenamed G.A.1, ended in failure when the carrier submarine, Iride, was sunk by British torpedo bombers in the Gulf of Bomba while readying to sail, on 22 August 1940. Giorgini, who was onboard Iride, barely survived along with the SLC operators, while most of the submarine's crew perished; the SLC operators themselves (including Tesei, Toschi, de la Penne and Birindelli) managed to save several survivors trapped in the sunken wreck of the Iride.

A new attempt, G.A.2, was quickly organized, with some changes from the previous one: the carrier submarine, Gondar, was equipped with special pressurized containers for the SLCs, which in the previous attempt had been simply lashed to Iride's deck; and he submarine sailed from an Italian port, Messina, rather than from a lightly defended Libyan anchorage as Iride had done. Having left Messina on 24 September 1940, Gondar arrived off Alexandria in the night between 28 and 29 September, but was then informed by Supermarina that the operation had been called off, as the Mediterranean Fleet had left Alexandria a few hours before to escort a convoy to Malta. Having set course for Tobruk, Gondar was then located and hunted by HMAS Stuart and HMS Diamond, badly damaged by depth charges and forced to surface, where she was scuttled by her crew. Along with the crew and the SLC operators, Giorgini was thus captured and sent to a prisoner of war camp in India, where he remained in captivity for nearly six years, only returning to Italy on 21 April 1946. The Raid on Alexandria would be attempted again and successfully in December 1941, depriving the Mediterranean Fleet of its battleships for over a year.

Upon returning from captivity, Giorgini was promoted to captain, later commanding the submarine depot ship Antonio Pacinotti and the light cruiser Giuseppe Garibaldi. In 1950 he was promoted to rear admiral. From 1956 to 1959 he held the position of Judge of the Military Supreme Court and later that of member of the commission for the granting and revocation of military awards, being promoted to fleet admiral in 1959. He died in Florence in 1977.
