= Fiorenzo Capriotti =

- Born: September 8, 1911; Ascoli Piceno, Kingdom of Italy
- Died: November 10, 2009 (aged 98); San Benedetto del Tronto, Italy
- Military career
- Allegiance: Kingdom of Italy; Italy
- Branch: Regia Marina; Marina Militare
- Service years: 1929 – 1945; 1947 – 1948
- Rank: Capo di terza classe
- Unit: Decima Flottiglia MAS
- Known for: Training of Shayetet 13
- Battles: Raid on Grand Harbour
- Awards: Silver Medal of Military Valor

Fiorenzo Capriotti (September 8, 1911 – November 10, 2009) was an Italian non-commissioned officer who served in the Royal Italian Navy during World War II. During his service, he was a member of the Decima Flottiglia MAS and was later awarded the Silver Medal of Military Valor for his actions during the Raid on Grand Harbour.

After the war, Capriotti traveled to Israel alongside two other Italian servicemen to train some of the first units of Shayetet 13.

== Early life and military career ==
Fiorenzo Capriotti was born in Ascoli Piceno, Kingdom of Italy, on September 8, 1911. In 1929, at the age of 18, he joined the Royal Italian Navy, and was assigned to the light cruiser Quarto aboard which he sailed to China. He later participated in the Second Italo-Ethiopian War and the Spanish Civil War.

At the outbreak of World War II, Capriotti held the rank of Capo di terza classe and was transferred to the Decima Flottiglia MAS due to his expertise in operating MT explosive motorboat. During the war he participated in the raid on Souda Bay and the raid on Grand Harbour. In the latter operation, he was severely wounded and captured by British forces.

== Post-war activities ==
After spending 5 years as prisoner of war in England, Scotland, Missouri, and later Hawaii, Capriotti returned to Italy in March 1946. As a returning veteran, he joined the newly established Italian Social Movement becoming one of its leading members and running as a candidate in the 1948 Italian general election.

Capriotti joined the newly established Italian Navy in 1947 but left the service the following year. During this period, he was contacted by Agostino Colosi, a friend he had met in Shanghai, who had previously worked for the Servizio Informazioni Militare. Colosi invited him to travel to Israel to train and help establish a special unit of the Israeli navy in accordance with the agreement between Alcide de Gasperi and Ada Sereni.

In June 1948, Capriotti, Geo Calderoni and Nicola Conte covertly arrived in Haifa where they begun an intensive training for soldiers recruited from the kibbutzim in the area. The trainees were led by men such as Yohai Ben-Nun who would later become commander of the Israeli navy.

The training took place during the 1948 Arab–Israeli War and the first operation of the newly established unit took place in Gaza, on October 22, when the unit sank the Egyptian flagship El Amir Farouq and a minesweeper.

On October 27, Capriotti returned to Italy but continued to maintain close ties with Israel, overseeing the shipment of equipment from Lugano to the unit he trained in Israel.

In 1992, Capriotti visited Atlit, where Navy Admiral Ami Ayalon appointed him honorary commander of Shayetet 13.

Capriotti later became an entrepreneur and in 1996 he received a medal from the Israeli government for his alleged assistance in the exodus of Jews from La Spezia. Capriotti had actually played no part in it, but Ada Sereni decided to award him the medal nevertheless. In 1998, he was among the guests at a gala held in Rome to celebrate the 50th anniversary of the establishment of State of Israel.

Capriotti died at the age of 98 at a hospital in San Benedetto del Tronto on November 10, 2009.
