= Vittorio Moccagatta =

Italian soldier

- Born: 11 November 1903; Bologna, Italy
- Died: 26 July 1941 (aged 37); Malta
- Military career
- Allegiance: Kingdom of Italy
- Branch: Regia Marina
- Service years: 1922–1941
- Rank: Commander
- Commands: Ciro Menotti (submarine); Saetta (destroyer); Decima Flottiglia MAS
- Conflicts: Spanish Civil War; World War II; Raid on Souda Bay; Raid on La Valletta
- Awards: Gold Medal of Military Valor (posthumous); Silver Medal of Military Valor

Vittorio Moccagatta (11 November 1903 – 26 July 1941) was an Italian naval officer during World War II. He commanded the Decima Flottiglia MAS, the special operations unit of the Royal Italian Navy, from September 1940 until his death in action on 26 July 1941.

== Biography ==
After attending the Royal Naval Academy of Livorno, he graduated as ensign in 1922, being promoted to sub-lieutenant on the following year. Three years later, after serving on MAS boats, he was promoted to lieutenant and embarked on the destroyer Insidioso and later on the submarine Ciro Menotti, of which he assumed command. During the Spanish Civil War he carried out submarine patrols in support of the Francoist, sinking the Republican supply ship Delfin on January 31, 1937. For his activity during the Spanish Civil War he was awarded a Silver Medal of Military Valor; in April 1937 he was given command of the detachment of the San Marco Regiment stationed in the Italian concession of Tientsin. In 1938, after returning to Italy, he assumed command of the destroyer Saetta, before being assigned to the Ministry of the Navy; on 1 July 1939 he was promoted to Commander.

In September 1940 Moccagatta assumed command of the I Flottiglia MAS (the special assault unit of the Regia Marina), replacing Commander Mario Giorgini, who had been captured by the British following the sinking of the submarine Gondar during an attempt to launch a manned torpedo attack on Alexandria. On Moccagatta's proposal, on March 15, 1941 the unit was renamed X Flottiglia MAS, after Julius Caesar's favorite legion, the Legio X Gemina. Decima MAS was then divided into two departments, one tasked with operations with underwater assault craft (such as manned torpedoes) and the other tasked with operations with surface assault craft (such as the MT explosive motorboats); Lieutenant Commander Junio Valerio Borghese was given command of the former and Lieutenant Commander Giorgio Giobbe of the latter, with Moccagatta holding overall command.

In early 1941 Moccagatta organized the first successful operation of the Decima MAS, the raid on Souda Bay of 26 March 1941, in which heavy cruiser HMS York was sunk and tanker Pericles was heavily damaged by six MTM explosive motorboats.

Four months later, on 26 July 1941, Moccagatta launched another combined operation against La Valletta, involving both manned torpedoes and explosive motorboats; British coastal radars on Malta, however, detected the approaching Italian force, and after allowing it to close in on the harbour entrance, opened fire on them at point blank range, destroying the MTM boats and killing or capturing all raiders. The supporting MAS boats were forced to withdraw while being pursued by the Royal Air Force; Commander Moccagatta, who was aboard MAS 452, was killed when the MAS was strafed by a Hawker Hurricane fighter plane, along with several of his men, including Giobbe and Captain Bruno Falcomatà, the medical officer of Decima MAS. Moccagatta was posthumously awarded the Gold Medal of Military Valor; after his death, the X MAS Flotilla named its surface craft department after him.
