= Luigi Faggioni =

Italian officer (1909–1991)

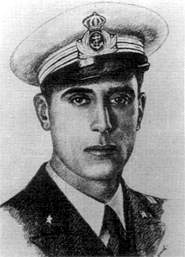
- Born: 9 November 1909; La Spezia, Liguria, Italy
- Died: 23 May 1991 (aged 81); Chiavari, Liguria, Italy
- Military career
- Allegiance: Kingdom of Italy
- Branch: Regia Marina; Italian Navy
- Service years: 1928–1970
- Unit: Decima Flottiglia MAS
- Conflicts: World War II; Raid on Souda Bay (POW)
- Awards: Gold Medal of Military Valor

Luigi Faggioni (9 November 1909 – 23 May 1991) was an Italian naval officer during World War II, and an admiral in the postwar Marina Militare.

== Biography ==
Faggioni was born in La Spezia in 1909. After graduating from the Nautical Institute of Camogli (Genoa), in August 1928 he began the course as a reserve officer in the Italian Navy, and in October 1929 he graduated as an ensign. He served for some time on torpedo boats and destroyers, and in 1931, after promotion to sub-lieutenant, he became a teacher in the C.R.E.M. (Corpo Regi Equipaggi Marittimi, Corps of Royal Naval Crews) schools. In 1935 he was mobilized due to the needs associated with the Second Italo-Ethiopian War, and was assigned on the destroyer Zeffiro. In 1937 he became lieutenant and was given command of MAS boats; in June 1939, after becoming aide to Prince Eugenio of Savoy, he organized an expedition in the East African lowland, earning a commendation for his organizational capacity.

In June 1940, with Italy's entry into World War II, Faggioni became a member of the 1st MAS Flotilla in La Spezia, where he was given command of a special section of MT explosive motorboats. He was later tasked with organizing and training a group of eight (later reduced to six) MTM explosive motorboats that would attack British shipping in Souda Bay, Crete, under his command. The action, known as the Raid on Souda Bay, was carried in the night of 26 March 1941. Carried by the destroyers Francesco Crispi and Quintino Sella till near Souda, the six MTM boats were led by Faggioni inside the bay, where they attacked different objectives. One MTM, operated by Sub-Lieutenant Angelo Cabrini, hit the heavy cruiser HMS York, partially sinking it in shallow water, and another one, operated by Sergeant Emilio Barberi, damaged the 8,324 GRT oil tanker Pericles, that would sink a few days later during the tow towards Alexandria. Faggioni's MTM missed its target and hit a pier, while the other three operators missed or were forced to scuttle their boats following mechanical breakdowns (one of them may have also hit Pericles, in addition to Barberi's one). Faggioni and his comrades were taken prisoner; all six were awarded the Gold Medal of Military Valor for the action in Souda Bay.

Faggioni, promoted to lieutenant commander in January 1944 (while still in Allied captivity), was repatriated in January 1945 during Italy's co-belligerence with the Allies and participated in the last stages of the Italian campaign as deputy commander of Mariassalto, the successor of the Tenth MAS Flotilla in Italy's co-belligerent forces. After the war he was given command of 6th Dredging Group and then of the 4th Dredging Group; after promotion to commander, he received command of the 1st Destroyer Squadron. Promoted to captain in 1956, he commanded the Divers and Raiders Center in Varignano, La Spezia and then the 5th Naval Group. In 1960 became a member of the High Council of the Armed Forces, and in January 1963 he was promoted to rear admiral and given command of the La Spezia Naval Base. He was then promoted to vice admiral and appointed commander of the Autonomous Naval Command Sardinia; after promotion to admiral in 1969, he was placed in auxiliary in January 1970. He died in Chiavari (Genoa) in 1991.
