= Gino Birindelli =

Italian politician

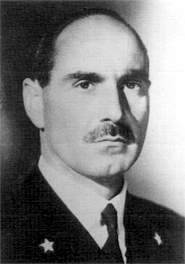
- Born: 19 January 1911; Pescia
- Died: 2 August 2008 (aged 97) Rome
- Allegiance: Kingdom of Italy Italy
- Branch: Regia Marina; Italian Navy
- Service years: 1930 - 1972
- Rank: Admiral

Gino Birindelli (20 January 1911, in Pescia – 2 August 2008, in Rome) was an Italian admiral and chief of the fleet of the Italian Navy. After his retirement from the Navy, he was elected as a member of the lower house of Parliament for the neo-fascist Italian Social Movement.

== Early life ==
In 1925, he was admitted to the Italian Naval Academy and in 1930, he became sub-lieutenant of the Regia Marina. Assigned to submarines, he commanded Dessie and, after, Rubino. After the degree in civil engineering from University of Pisa in 1937, in 1939, he was a trainer for frogmen commandos and human torpedoes and was sent to the V Flottiglia MAS.

== World War II ==
On 21 October 1940, the submarine Sciré departed La Spezia and sailed to Gibraltar carrying three manned torpedoes and four crews. The Decima MAS frogmen, commanded by Birindelli, entered the harbour but were unable to attack any ships due to technical problems with the torpedoes and breathing equipment. Only one human torpedo managed to get close to a target, the battleship HMS Barham. The charge exploded but did not cause significant damage. The two crewmen, Birindelli and Damos Paccagnini, were captured by the British. The other four (including Teseo Tesei) managed to reach Spain and returned to Italy. Valuable experience was gained in this operation by the Decima. Gino Birindelli received the Medaglia d'Oro al Valor Militare (MOVM), his second, Damos Paccagnini received the Medaglia d'Argento al Valore Militare (MAVM). He remained a prisoner of the Allies until he was repatriated in 1944. After his release, he fought with the Italian Co-belligerent Navy against the Germans.

== After the war ==
After the war, Birindelli was made Commander of Italian marines Comando Raggruppamento Subacquei e Incursori Teseo Tesei in 1952. In 1956 he was the commander of the cruiser Raimondo Montecuccoli. He was promoted to rear admiral in 1959, admiral in 1962 and fleet admiral in 1966. In 1969, he became chief of fleet, overseeing all operational units of the Italian Navy. In 1970 he became chief of Mediterranean Command of the NATO Fleet in Malta (he would be dismissed the following year by Dom Mintoff's Labour Party government, which declared him persona non grata within a day from the new cabinet's swearing-in) and commander in chief NATO naval forces in southern Europe.

In 1972 Giorgio Almirante, the leader of the Italian Social Movement, added establishment figures such as admiral Birindelli as members. Birindelli was president of the party from 1972-1973. He served in the Italian Parliament between 1972 and 1976, with MSI-DN. Birindelli was a member of the clandestine masonic lodge Propaganda Due, although he later claimed he did not think highly of the organization.

== Honour ==
- Italy: Knight Grand Cross of the Order of Merit of the Italian Republic (8 July 1977)
