= Italian aviso Diana =

Italian Navy ship, 1940–1942

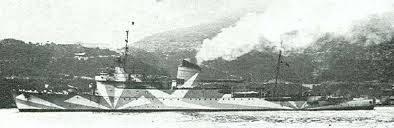

History

Kingdom of Italy
- Name: Diana
- Builder: Cantieri Navali del Quarnaro, Fiume
- Laid down: 31 May 1939
- Launched: 20 May 1940
- Completed: 12 November 1940
- Fate: Sunk, 29 June 1942

General characteristics
- Type: Fast aviso
- Displacement: 1,764 t (1,736 long tons) standard; 2,591 t (2,550 long tons) full load
- Length: 113.9 m (373 ft 8 in) o.a.; 108.75 m (356 ft 9 in) p.p.
- Beam: 11.70 m (38 ft 5 in)
- Draught: 3.50 m (11 ft 6 in)
- Installed power: 4 × three-drum boilers, 2 × geared turbines; 30,000 shaft horsepower (22,000 kW)
- Propulsion: 2 shafts
- Speed: 32 knots (37 mph; 59 km/h)
- Armament: 2 × Cannon 102/35 Model 1914 guns; 6 × Breda 20/65 mod. 35 AA guns

Diana was a fast aviso (Italian: avviso veloce) or sloop of the Italian Regia Marina which served during the Second World War. Originally designed as a yacht and despatch vessel for the Italian Head of Government, she was converted for military use.

== Construction ==
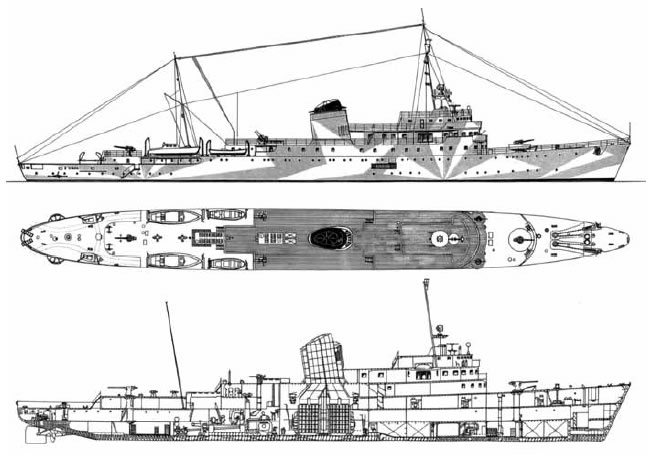
Plans of the Italian sloop Diana

Diana was laid down on 31 May 1939 at the Cantieri Navali del Quarnaro in Fiume, launched on 20 May 1940 and completed on 12 November 1940. The planned main armament consisted of two 90/50 guns, modern anti-aircraft weapons used on the latest Italian battleships but eventually a pair of old 102/35 4-inch guns was fitted in their place. Six 20 mm Breda 20/65 mod. 35 guns completed the anti-aircraft defence. During the war Diana was used as fast transport for valuable cargo.

== Second World War ==
The ship left Messina, Italy on 28 June 1942 to bring material and personnel to Tobruk, a city recently reconquered by the Axis forces. In what he described as his "most satisfactory patrol" in the Mediterranean, in June 1942, Sir Hugh Mackenzie, Commander of the British submarine HMS Thrasher, reported that on their way back to Alexandria, north of Tobruk, they received a signal about an Axis ship which was due in the area at 12 o'clock on the following day and that it was vitally important to sink it (presumed to be Diana). The ship wasn't sighted the following day, but during the night, they received another signal about the same ship going to be in a certain position at 12 o'clock on the following day, and that it was vitally important to sink the ship. The ship was carrying petrol for an Axis offensive.

== 29 June 1942 ==
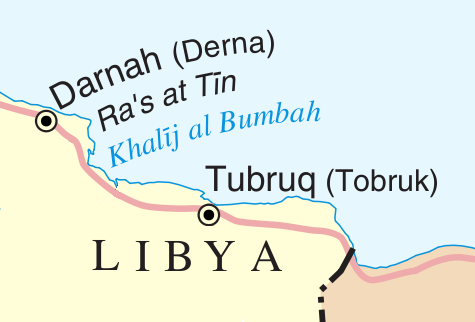
Gulf of Bomba

On 29 June 1942, about 75 nmi (139 km; 86 mi) north of the Gulf of Bomba, 100 nmi (190 km; 120 mi) north-west of Tobruk, Diana detected the launch of four torpedoes. Thrasher had fired the torpedoes, two of which were avoided with a quick turn but the other two exploded aft causing Diana to sink in less than 15 minutes at 33° 30'N and 23° 30' E. Some of the escort boats, after having failed to sink Thrasher, rescued survivors. Later, between 29 and 30 June, the hospital ship Arno arrived, which took care, albeit in rough seas, of the recovery of the 119 survivors; 336 members of the crew had been killed.

== Bibliography ==
- Brown, David (1995) [1990]. Warship Losses of World War Two (2nd rev. ed.). London: Arms and Armour Press. ISBN 978-1-85409-278-6.
- Cernuschi, Enrico; Brescia, Maurizio; Bagnasco, Erminio (2010). Le navi ospedale italiane 1935–1945 [Italian Hospital Ships 1935–1945]. Parma: Albertelli. ISBN 978-8-88-737286-1.
- Chesneau, Roger, ed. (1992) [1980]. Conway's All the World's Fighting Ships 1922–1946 (3rd ed.). Conway Maritime Press. ISBN 0-85177-146-7.
- Fraccaroli, Aldo (1968). Italian warships of World War 2. London: Ian Allan. OCLC 464456943.
- Rohwer, Jürgen (2005) [1972]. Chronology of the War at Sea, 1939–1945: The Naval History of World War Two (3rd rev. ed.). London: Chatham Publishing. ISBN 1-86176-257-7.
