= Italian submarine Gondar =

Italian submarine

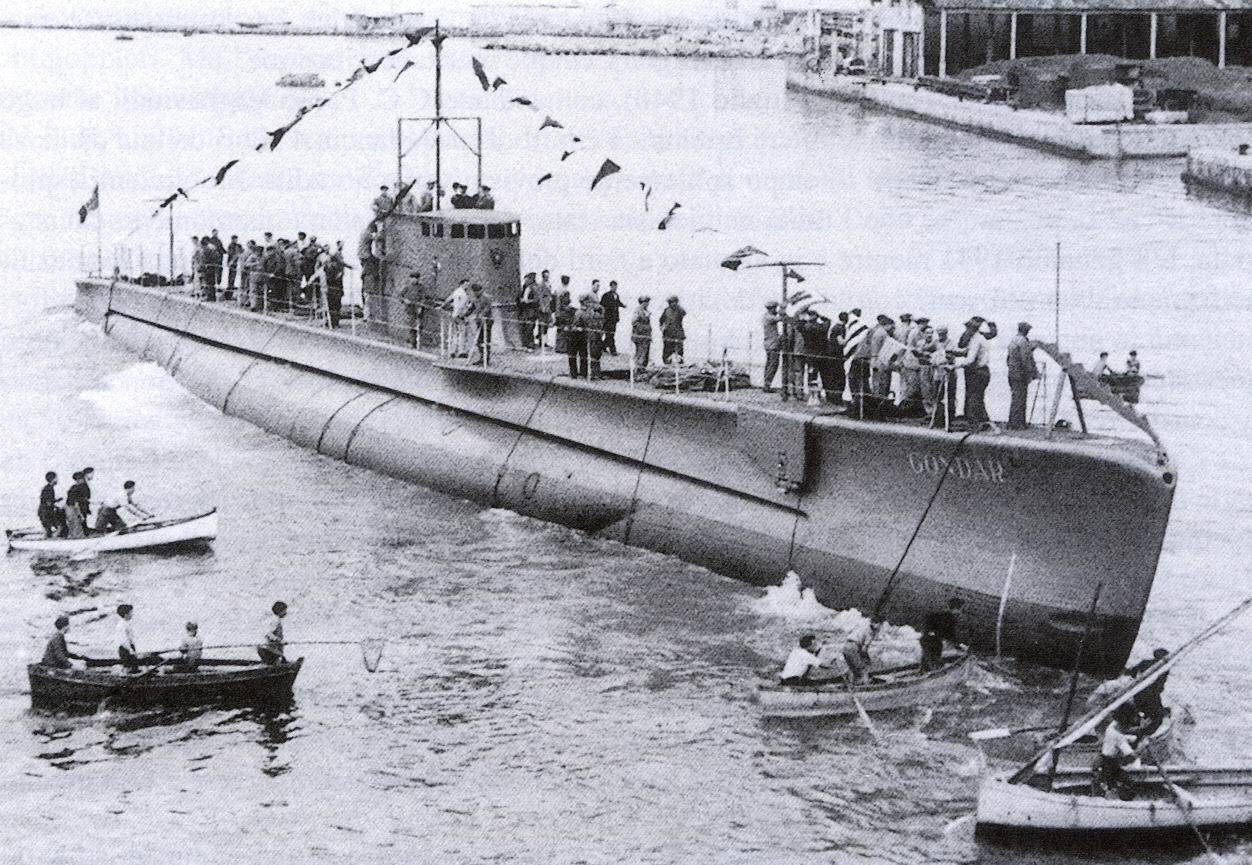
- Launch of RIN Gondar in Muggiano

History

Kingdom of Italy
- Name: Gondar
- Namesake: Gondar
- Builder: OTO, Muggiano
- Laid down: 15 January 1937
- Launched: 3 October 1937
- Commissioned: 28 February 1938
- Fate: Scuttled, 30 September 1940

General characteristics
- Class & type: 600-Serie Adua-class submarine
- Displacement: 680 long tons (691 t) surfaced; 844 long tons (858 t) submerged
- Length: 60.28 m (197 ft 9 in)
- Beam: 6.45 m (21 ft 2 in)
- Draught: 4.64 m (15 ft 3 in)
- Installed power: 1,400 hp (1,000 kW) (diesels); 800 hp (600 kW) (electric motors)
- Propulsion: Diesel-electric; 2 × FIAT diesel engines; 2 × Marelli electric motors
- Speed: 14 knots (26 km/h; 16 mph) surfaced; 7.5 knots (13.9 km/h; 8.6 mph) submerged
- Range: 3,180 nmi (5,890 km; 3,660 mi) at 10.5 kn (19.4 km/h; 12.1 mph) surfaced; 74 nmi (137 km; 85 mi) at 4 knots (7.4 km/h; 4.6 mph) submerged
- Test depth: 80 m (260 ft)
- Complement: 44 (4 officers + 40 non-officers and sailors)
- Armament: 1 × 100 mm (4 in) / 47 caliber deck gun; 2 x 1 – 13.2 mm (0.52 in) anti-aircraft guns; 6 × 533 mm (21 in) torpedo tubes (4 forward, 2 aft); 12 × torpedoes; (deck gun was removed in 1940 and 3 Human torpedo launchers were installed instead)

Italian submarine Gondar was an Adua-class submarine built for the Royal Italian Navy (Regia Marina) during the 1930s. It was named after the city of Gondar in northern Ethiopia.

== Design and description ==
The Adua-class submarines were essentially repeats of the preceding Perla class. They displaced 680 long tons (690 t) surfaced and 844 long tons (858 t) submerged. The submarines were 60.18 meters (197 ft 5 in) long, had a beam of 6.45 meters (21 ft 2 in) and a draft of 4.7 meters (15 ft 5 in).

For surface running, the boats were powered by two 600-brake-horsepower (447 kW) diesel engines, each driving one propeller shaft. When submerged each propeller was driven by a 400-horsepower (298 kW) electric motor. They could reach 14 knots (26 km/h; 16 mph) on the surface and 7.5 knots (13.9 km/h; 8.6 mph) underwater. On the surface, the Adua class had a range of 3,180 nautical miles (5,890 km; 3,660 mi) at 10.5 knots (19.4 km/h; 12.1 mph), submerged, they had a range of 74 nmi (137 km; 85 mi) at 4 knots (7.4 km/h; 4.6 mph).

The boats were armed with six internal 53.3 cm (21.0 in) torpedo tubes, four in the bow and two in the stern. One reload torpedo was carried for each tube, for a total of twelve. They were also armed with one 100 mm (4 in) deck gun for combat on the surface. The light anti-aircraft armament consisted of one or two pairs of 13.2 mm (0.52 in) machine guns.

== Construction and career ==
Gondar was launched on 3 October 1937 in OTO's shipyard in La Spezia and commissioned on 28 September 1938. Initially, she was assigned to 14th Squadron based at La Spezia. After intensive training and exercises, in August of 1938 Gondar was reassigned to the III Submarine Group based at Leros. During 1939, Gondar made a long endurance training in the Dodecanese, and in February of 1940 the submarine was temporarily assigned to Messina, and finally in May 1940 she became a part of 15th Squadron (I Submarine group) based at La Spezia.

At the outbreak of hostilities she was immediately sent on a mission to patrol an area along the French coast and Gulf of Genoa. She returned to the base on 14 June 1940 without encountering any enemy traffic.

After completing two more missions, one 20 miles east of Cape Antibes from 18 to 25 June 1940, and the other off the Strait of Gibraltar from 5 to 16 August 1940, Gondar was moved into Arsenal at La Spezia to convert her into SLC carrying submarine. Three SLC (Siluro a Lunga Corsa which means long running torpedo) units were fitted onto the boat on her deck, two placed side by side in the aft, and one on her bow, the submarine's deck gun was also removed to accommodate SLC units. With a weight of 2.8 tons, these SLC cylinders were able to withstand depths up to 90 meters, triple the depth the first system that was installed on Iride.

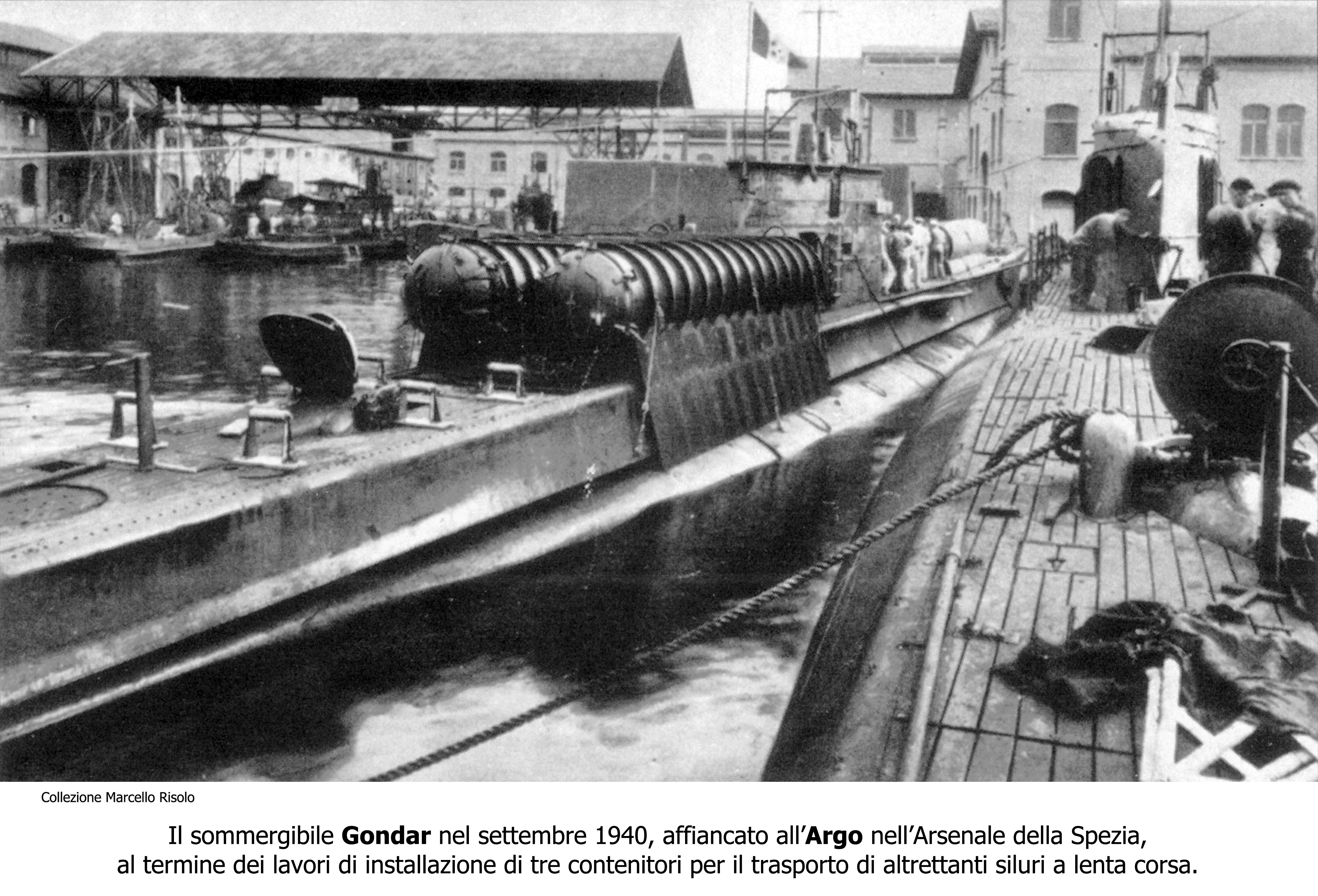
Submarines Gondar (left) and Argo in La Spezia (September 1940).

On 21 September 1940 Gondar, under command of captain Francesco Brunetti, sailed from La Spezia to raid the naval base of Alexandria, after the first attempt by Iride had failed. In the evening of September 23, 1940 Gondar arrived in Messina, where she embarked on an SLC unit of six officers, one NCO and 3 sailors. On 25 September 1940 she secretly left for Alexandria. On 29 September Gondar was ordered to head to Tobruk, as the British naval force had sortied from Alexandria. While on her way to Tobruk, at 20:30 on the same day, Gondar spotted an enemy ship, about 1,500 meters away. The submarine tried to disengage by diving to 80 meters, however, she was almost immediately detected by ASDIC of destroyer HMAS Stuart who immediately attacked the submarine with depth charges. In two hours, at 22:30 two more ships joined the hunt, an armed trawler Sindonis, and HMS Diamond, with additional units coming to help as the hunt went on, including Sunderland flying boats. The ongoing depth charge attacks caused serious damage to the submarine and especially to the SLC units which were beginning to flood. At 8:30 on September 30, 1940, Gondar had to surface, due to sustained damage and almost completely exhausted reserves of oxygen. Upon surfacing, the crew scuttled the boat with explosive charges. Except for electrician Luigi Longobardi, who was killed by one of the bombs dropped by a Sunderland flying boat, the entire crew was rescued and imprisoned by the British.

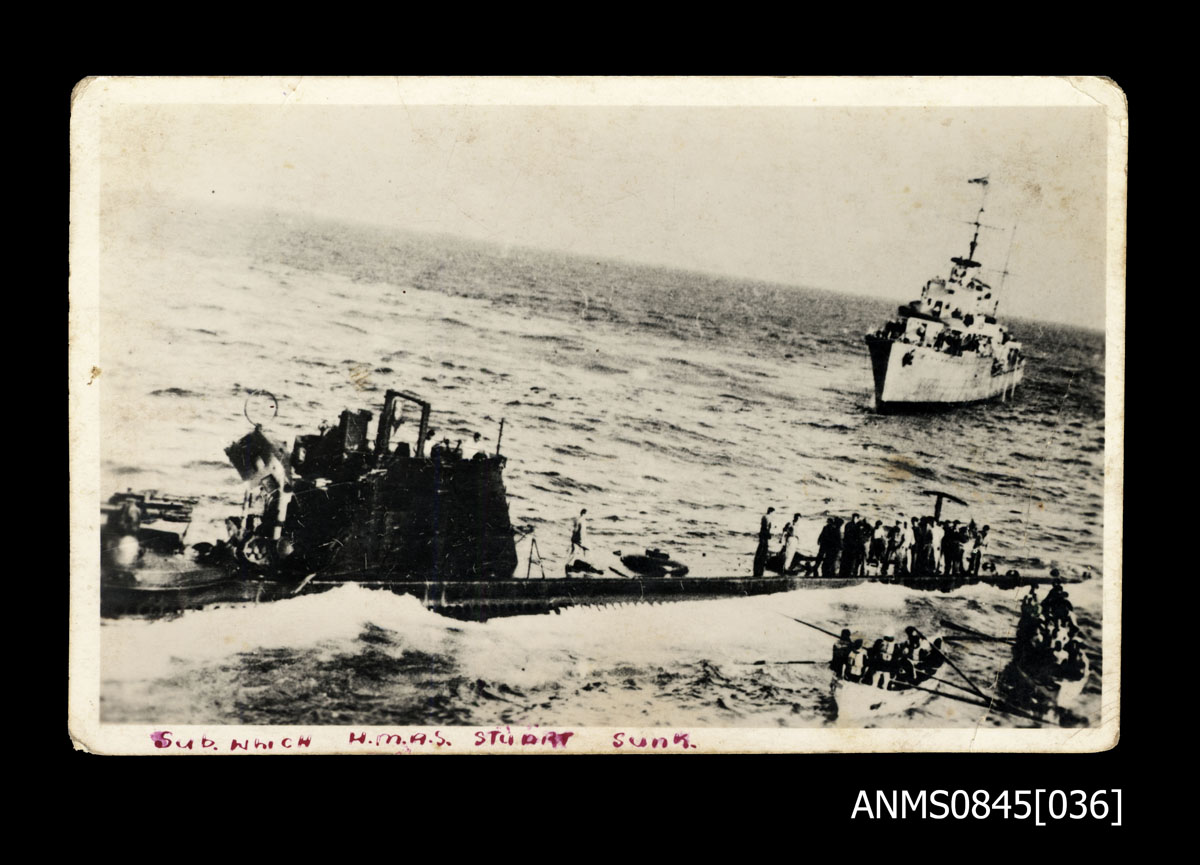
Evacuation of the Gondar

With sinking of Gondar, the British intelligence noted the three cylinders on the deck of the submarine, and a presence of numerous divers among the crew. That raised questions about existence of special units in Regia Marina responsible for penetration into enemy ports.
