= Teseo Tesei =

Italian naval officer and pioneering military diver

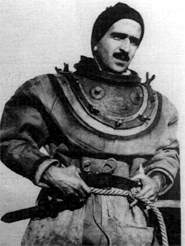
- Born: 3 January 1909; Elba, Italy
- Died: 26 July 1941 (aged 32); Malta
- Military career
- Allegiance: Italy
- Branch: Regia Marina (Italian Royal Navy)
- Service years: 1929–1941
- Rank: Major
- Unit: Decima Flottiglia MAS
- Conflicts: World War II: Siege of Malta
- Awards: Gold Medal for Military Honor (posthumous)

Teseo Tesei (3 January 1909 – 26 July 1941) was an Italian naval officer, who invented the human torpedo (called Maiale, Italian for "pig") used by the Regia Marina during World War II.

== Early life and education ==
Teseo Tesei was born in Marina di Campo Elba in 1909, the son of Ulisse Tesei and Rosa Carassale. After attending the Collegio degli Scolopi in Florence, he entered the Livorno Naval Academy in 1931, where he distinguished himself for perseverance and inventiveness. He was commissioned as a lieutenant and graduated from the Naval Engineering School in Naples in 1933.

== Career ==
Tesei had several posts on both surface ships and submarines. He was a volunteer in the Spanish Civil War with the rank of captain.

In 1929, Tesei had the idea for the manned torpedo, from the Italian device used to sink the Austrian battleship SMS Viribus Unitis during World War I. In 1931 he entered the Naval Academy of Livorno, where he showed his inventive capabilities. Together with Elios Toschi, he designed a human torpedo called Siluro a lenta corsa (SLC) ("Slow-Run Torpedo"), later nicknamed the Maiale, Italian for "pig", because it proved to be difficult to steer. The SLC was extensively used in World War II by the Italian Navy and was used in the sinking of two British battleships in Alexandria. The British later developed their own manned torpedo model, called "Chariot", from one of his captured "Maiali". In 1936, with Angelo Belloni he designed the high-performance closed-circuit self-contained breathing apparatus that was used by the Italian underwater raiders during their WWII operations, and that heavily influenced the following German and British wartime rebreathers design. In 1938 he was one of the officers who organized the Decima Flottiglia MAS underwater raiders unit of the Italian Navy. On 21 August 1940, Tesei was the only survivor when the Italian submarine Iride was sunk.

== Killed in action ==
On 26 July 1941, Tesei died in action during a manned torpedo attack on Malta (see Decima Flottiglia MAS#1941), for which he was posthumously awarded the Italian Gold Medal of Military Valour.

== Legacy ==
The modern Italian commando frogmen group Comando Raggruppamento Subacquei ed Incursori Teseo Tesei (COMSUBIN) is named after him.

== See also ==
- Decima Flottiglia MAS
- Battle of the Mediterranean

== Bibliography ==
- Greene, Jack The Black Prince and the Sea Devils: The Story of Valerio Borghese and the Elite Units of the Decima Mas. Da Capo Press. Cambridge/Mass., 2004 ISBN 0-306-81311-4
- Schofield, William. Frogmen First Battles. New York, 2000 ISBN 0-8283-2088-8
