= Italian submarine Scirè =

Scirè was the name of at least two ships of the Italian Navy and may refer to:

- Italian submarine Scirè (1938), an Adua-class submarine, launched in 1938 and sunk in 1942.
- Italian submarine Scirè (S 527), a Todaro-class submarine launched in 2004.
