= List of Istrians =

Coat of arms of Istria

This is a list of notable Istrians. People of Istrian descent born outside the geographical region of Istria have their place of birth credited. The nationality and ethnicity of people included in this list are not mentioned. (Note: except for people of Istrian descent born outside Europe)

== Academic sciences ==
=== Historians ===
- Josip Bratulić, philologist, historian, and the 22nd President of Matica hrvatska
- Gian Rinaldo Carli, historian, economist, antiquarian, professor of astronomy and navigation
- Petar Stanković (1771–1852), historian, archeologist, inventor and writer

=== Philosophers ===
- Franciscus Patricius (Frane Petrić), philosopher and scientist; a known defender of Platonism and an opponent of Aristotelianism
- Anton Mahnič, Roman Catholic bishop, theologian and philosopher, founder and the main leader of the Croatian Catholic movement
- Hermannus Sclavus, 12th-century philosopher, astronomer, astrologer, mathematician, translator and author
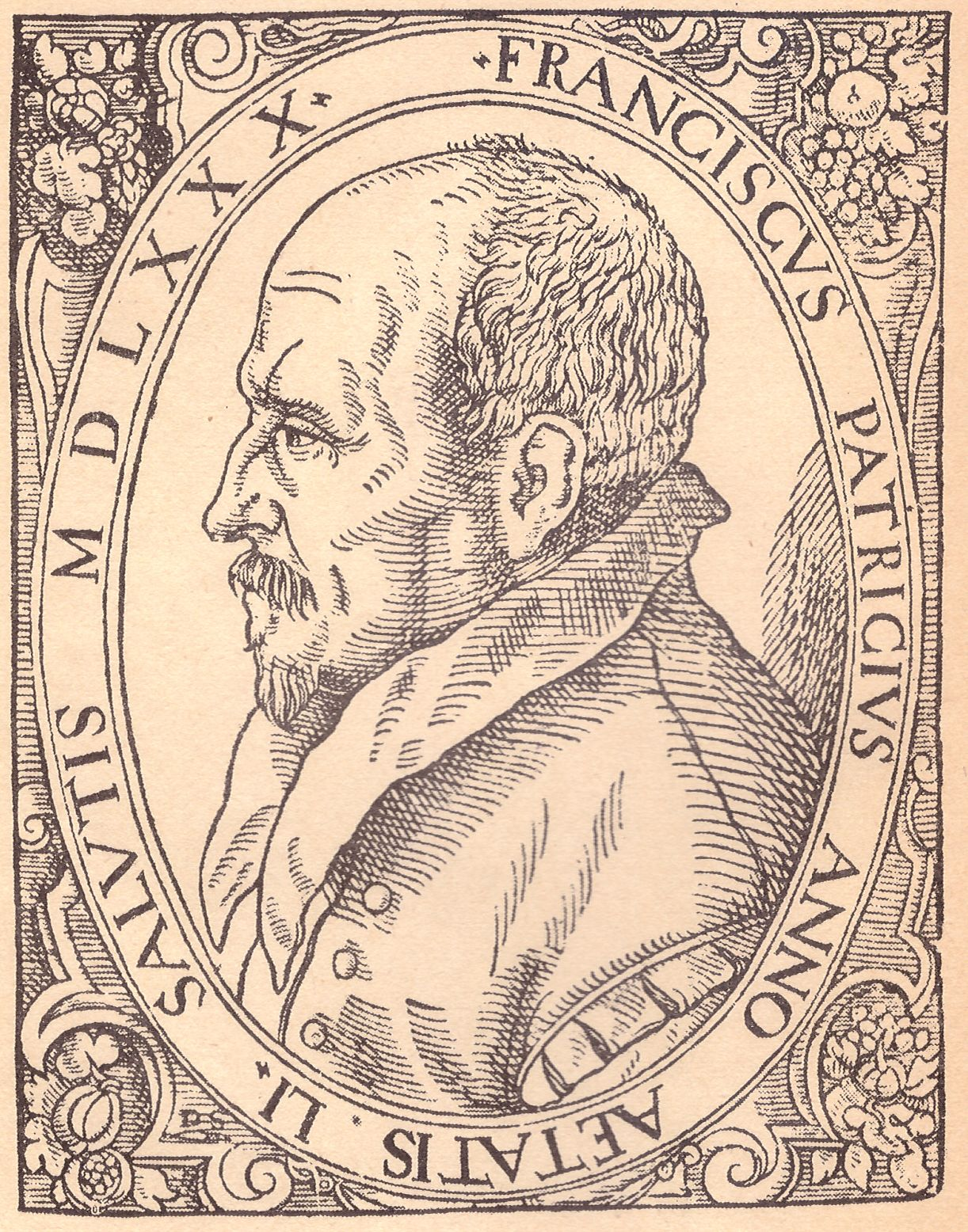
Patricius

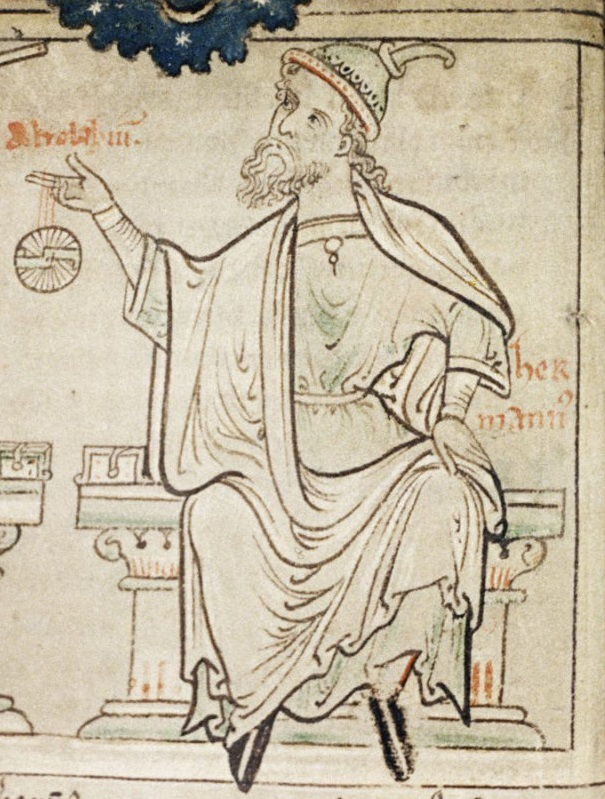
Sclavus

=== Scientists ===
- Josip Belušić, professor of physics and mathematics, inventor; invented the speedometer
- Paolo Budinich, theoretical physicist
- Lucija Čok, linguist and politician, former minister of education of Slovenia
- Antonio Grossich, surgeon, introduced tincture of iodine as a way of sterilization in 1908
- Andrija Mohorovičić, meteorologist and geophysicist, known for the eponymous Mohorovičić discontinuity and considered one of the founders of modern seismology
- Stjepan Mohorovičić, physicist, geophysicist and meteorologist called "the father of positronium," whose existence he predicted
- Fran Novljan, Croatian educator and andragogue
- Herman Potočnik, rocket engineer, pioneer of astronautics; He is remembered for his work addressing the long-term human habitation of space, and for conceiving the first space station
- Santorio Santorio, physiologist and physician who is considered the father of modern quantitative experimentation in medicine; his studies of basal metabolism introduced quantitative experimental procedure into medical research
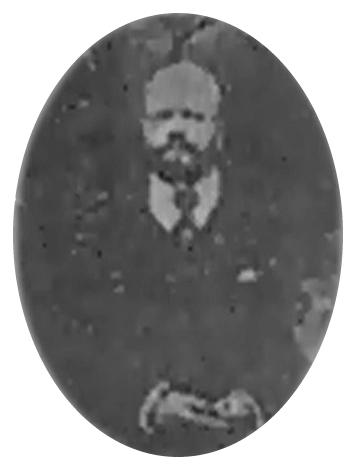
Belušić

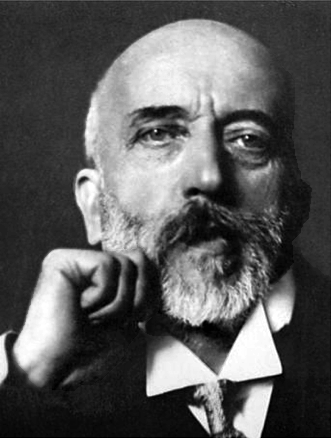
Mohorovičić

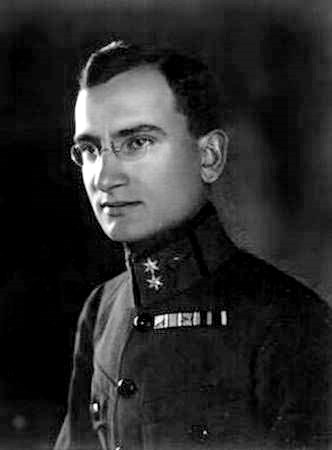
Potočnik

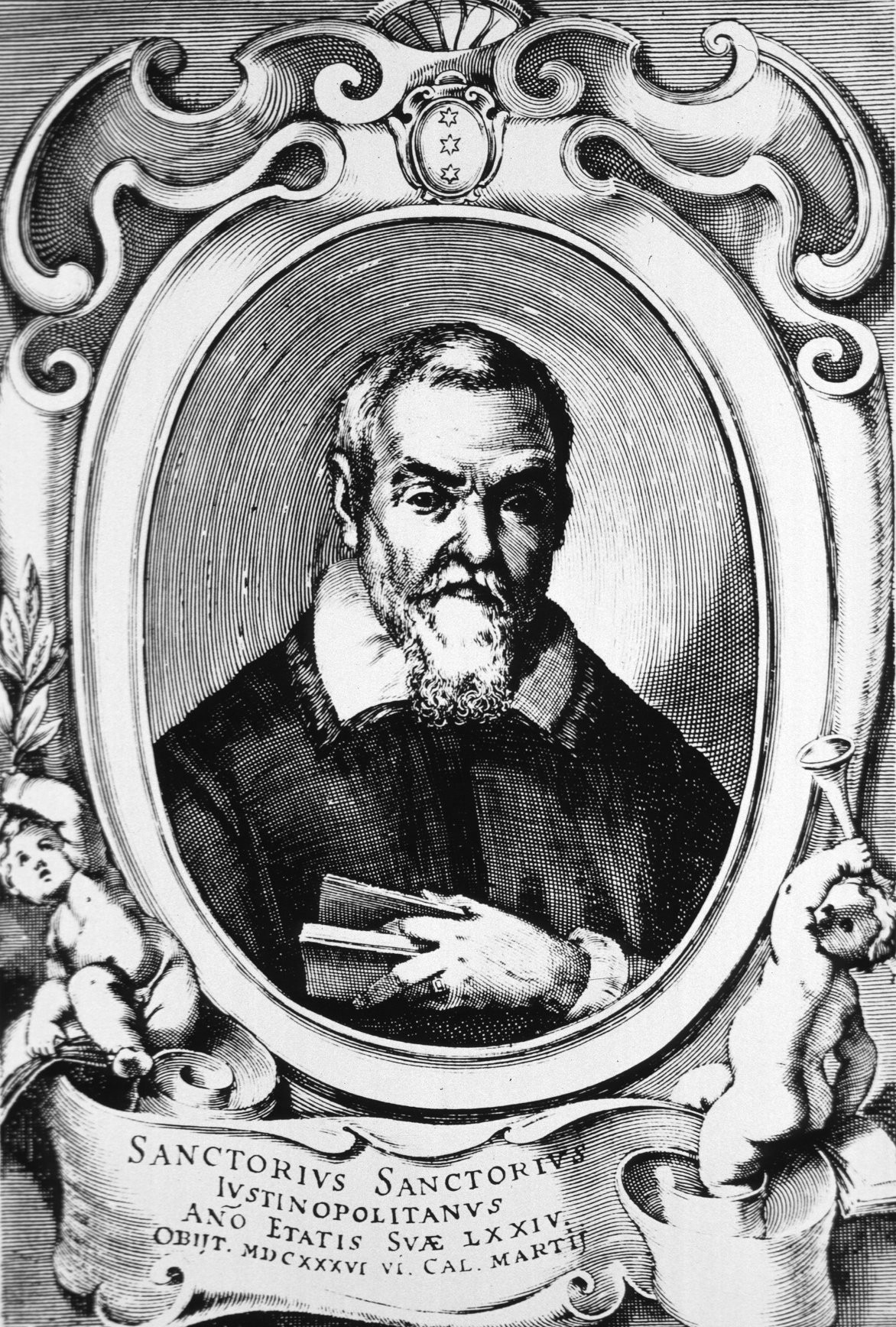
Santorio

== Arts ==
- Laura Antonelli (Antonaz), film actress, appeared in 45 films between 1964 and 1991
- Joe Bastianich, American restaurateur, author, showman, television personality born in Queens, N.Y. to Istrian parents of Italian nationality but largely East European descent (Note: Regarding her identity, Joe's mother Lidia has stated: "I feel very Italian, but I do have some Slavic in me, and I relate to that as well; so that forms the mixture that is Lidia.")
- Lidia Bastianich, celebrity chef, television host, author, and restaurateur
- Karlo Bilić (Charles Billich), contemporary artist based in Sydney, Australia
- Josip Crnobori, 20th-century painter
- Jadranka Đokić, film, television and stage actress
- Bruno Juričić, architect
- Luka Juričić, stage, television and film actor
- Orlando Mohorović, modernist artist
- Antun Motika, 20th-century modernist painter
- Bernardo Parentino, painter of the Renaissance
- Renato Percan, modernist painter
- Jakov Puljanin, architect
- Rick Rossovich, American actor, born in Palo Alto, California, U.S. to a father of distant Istrian Croatian origins (his paternal great-great grandfather was from Mošćenička Draga)
- Tim Rossovich, American actor, former NFL linebacker and 1969 Pro Bowl; brother of actor Rick Rossovich
- Teresa Scanlan, American beauty pageant who was named Miss Nebraska 2010; won Miss America 2011 at age 17 and became the youngest Miss America since Bette Cooper in 1937; grandparents are from Ilovik, Cres-Lošinj archipelago
- Sebastiano Schiavone da Rovigno, woodcarver and marquetry artist
- Angelo and Francesco Trevisani, painters of the late-Baroque, active mainly in Venice
- Alida Valli, actress who appeared in over 100 movies, including a number of American films

== Literature ==
- Mate Balota, poet, novelist and economist
- Boris Domagoj Biletić, writer, literary critic and vice-president of the Croatian Writers' Association
- Viktor Car Emin (1870–1963), writer, publicist, and revivalist of Croatian nationalism
- Zvane Črnja, poet, prose writer, essayist, culturologist, screenwriter, playwright and filmologist, journalist, publicist, polemicist and publisher
- Andreas Divus Justinopolitanus, Renaissance scholar who translated the Iliad and the Odyssey into Latin, and was the author of their first published version
- Drago Gervais, poet, writer and playwright in the Chakavian dialect of Croatian
- Simon Greblo, priest, Glagolitic writer and scribe; with Žakan Juri, one of the most important connoisseurs of the Glagolitic alphabet at the end of the 15th century
- Antun Kalac, poet, writer, playwright, translator and revivalist of Croatian nationalism
- Eugen Kumičić, writer and politician; one of the most prolific Croatian novelists of the realism era and a pioneer of naturalism in Croatian literature; with Ante Starčević, significantly contributed to the birth of Croatian nationalism
- Giuseppina Martinuzzi, educator, journalist, socialist, and feminist
- Božo Milanović, priest, historian, writer, antifascist
- Daniel Načinović, poet, prose writer, essayist, journalist, and translator
- Pier Antonio Quarantotti Gambini, writer and journalist, author of novels, poetry, and essays
- Tone Peruško, writer and pedagogue
- Fulvio Tomizza, writer
- Žakan Juri, priest, Glagolitic writer and herald of the first Croatian printed book
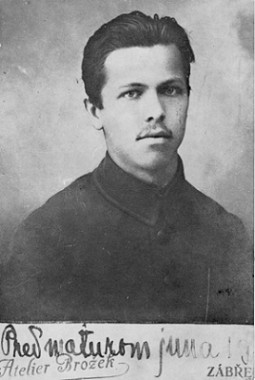
Balota

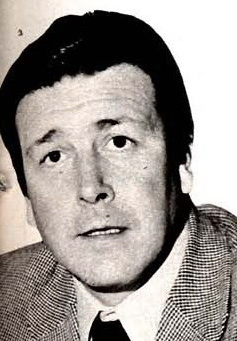
Tomizza

== Music ==
- Andrea Antico, music printer, editor, publisher and composer of the Renaissance, who is regarded as the first significant music printer
- Franka Batelić, singer and songwriter, who won the first edition of Showtime and represented Croatia at the Eurovision Song Contest 2018
- Michael Bublé, Canadian singer, songwriter, and record producer; grandparents were Istrians, Italian and possibly Slavic (Note: Bublé has stated in his memoir: "[On the side of the family native of modern-day Croatia] some say we're Yugoslavian, others that we're Italian.")
- Tony Cetinski, pop singer, one of the most popular musicians in Croatia and countries of former Yugoslavia
- Luigi Dallapiccola, composer known for his lyrical twelve-tone compositions
- Sergio Endrigo, singer-songwriter, won the Sanremo Music Festival in 1968, and represented Italy at the Eurovision Song Contest 1968
- Gustafi, Porin Award-winning folk rock ban
- Tamara Obrovac, ethno jazz singer, flutist, songwriter and composer, won a total of four Porins; singer with second most Porins for best female vocal performance, after Josipa Lisac
- Lidija Percan, singer, famous for her songs in the Italian Istroveneto dialect
- Lea Sirk, singer who represented Slovenia at the 2018 Eurovision Song Contest
- Antonio Smareglia, opera composer born to an Istrian Italian father and a Croatian mother, Julija Štiglić
- Luka Šulić, cellist born in Maribor to an Istrian Slovenian mother from Izola He is a member of 2CELLOS, along with Stjepan Hauser, who was born in Pula
- Giuseppe Tartini, Baroque composer and violinist
- Francesco Usper, composer and organist
- Alen Vitasović, Croatian pop singer and songwriter, famous for singing and writing songs about Istria in the Chakavian dialect
- Massimo Savić, pop singer
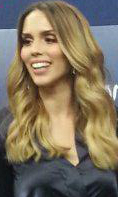
Batelić

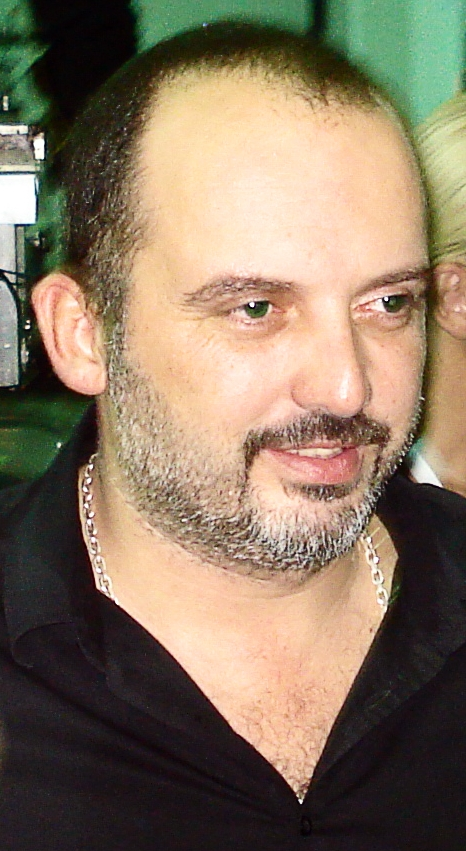
Cetinski

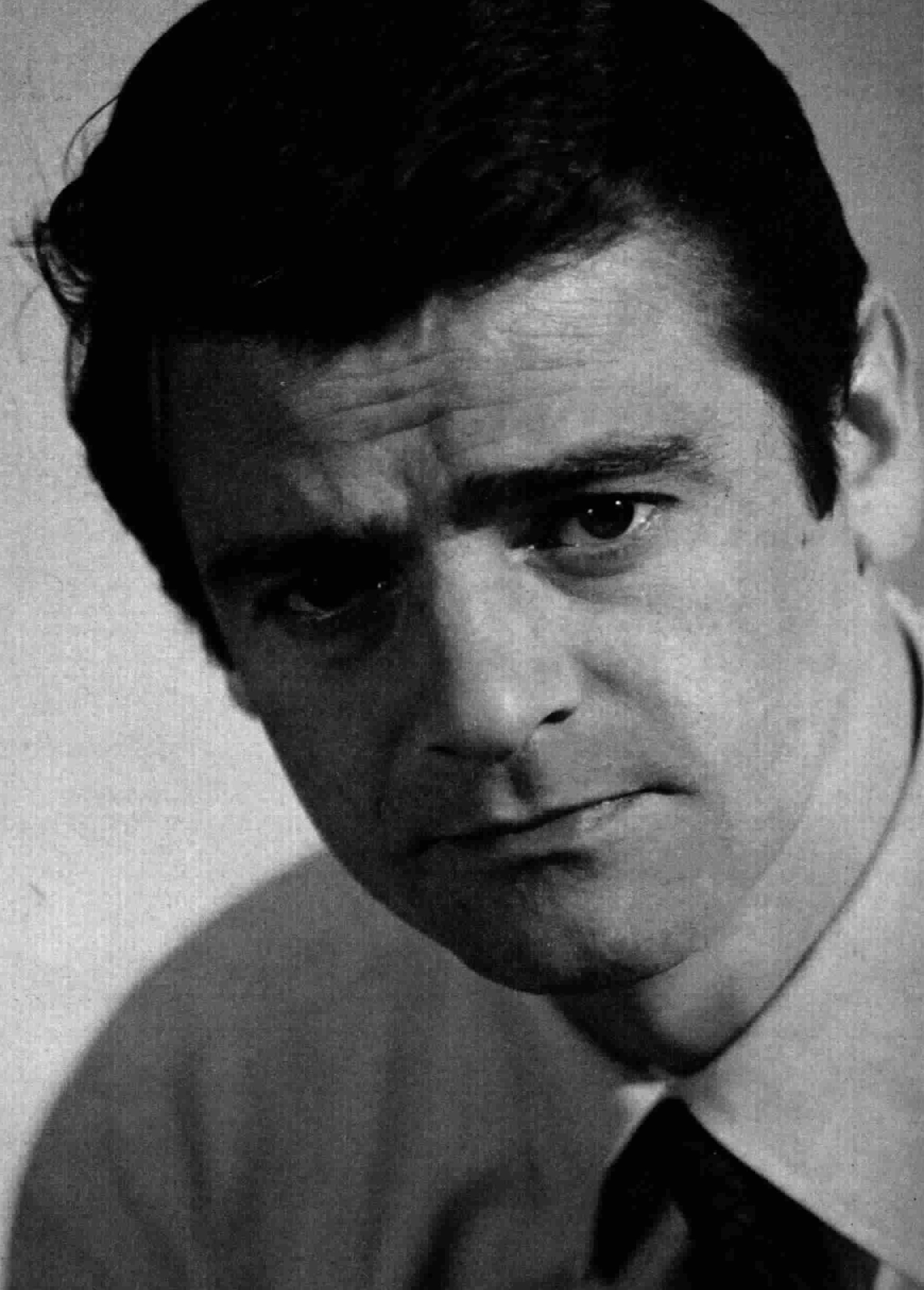
Endrigo

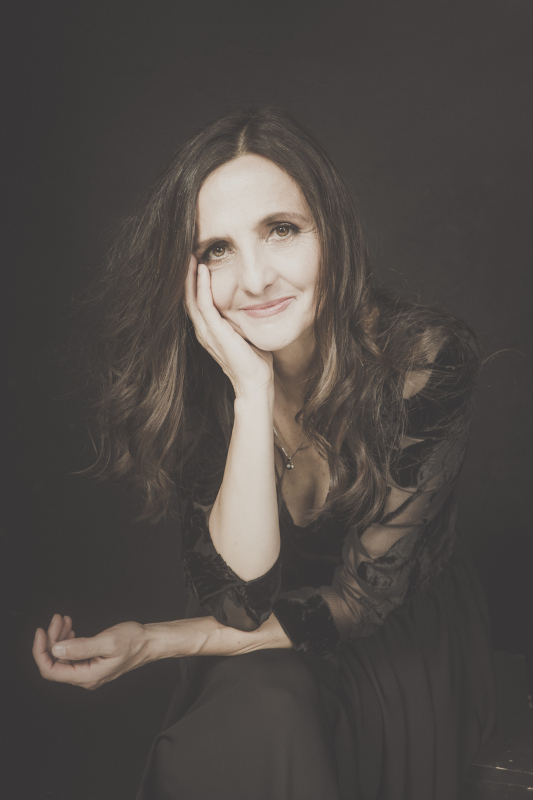
Obrovac

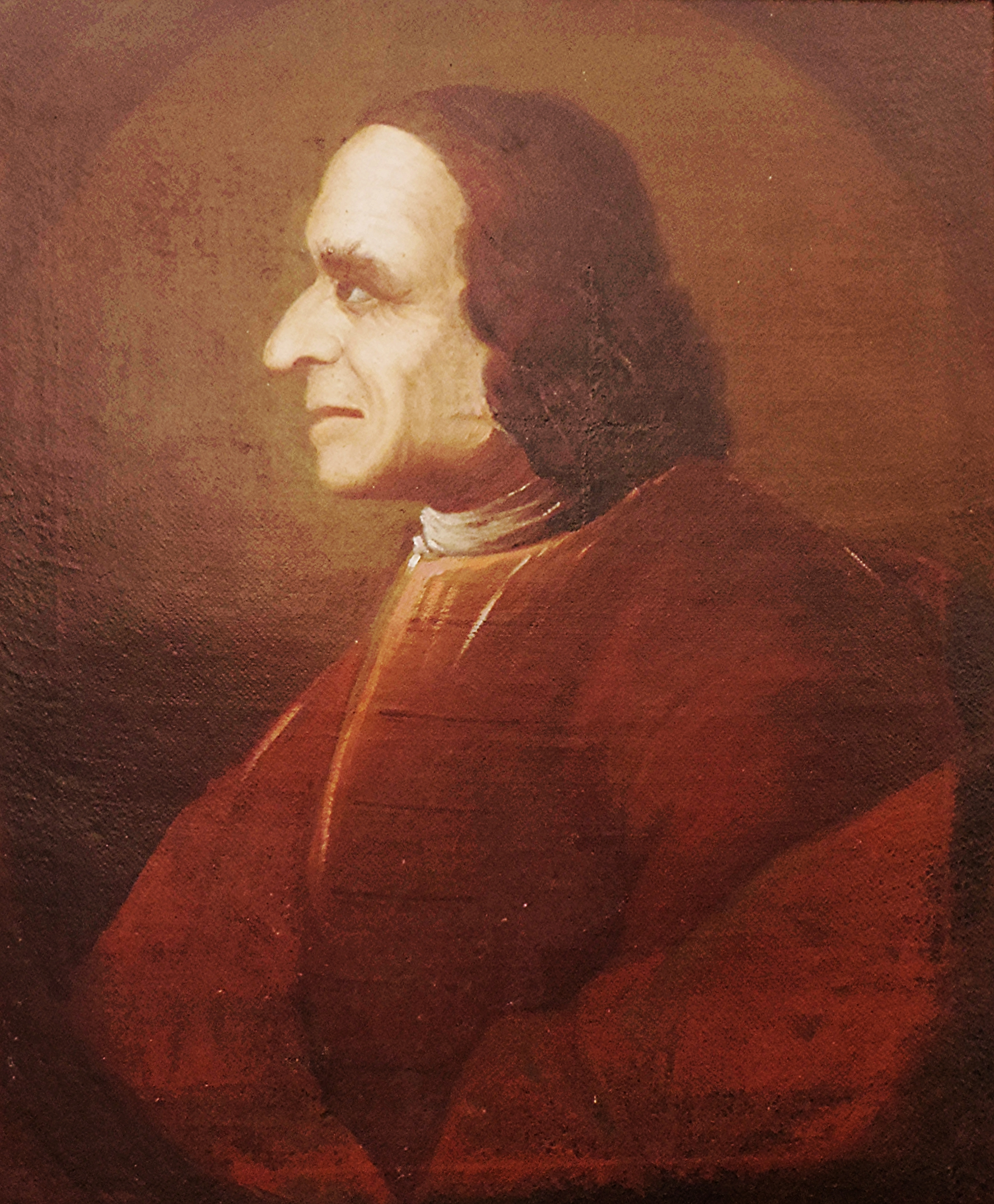
Tartini

== Military leaders ==
- Mate Blažina, anti-fascist, Order of Bravery and Order of the National Hero
- Gulfaris, Lombard duke of Istria
- Wilhelm Ehm, WW2 Wehrmacht veteran and East German Admiral who was Deputy Minister of National Defense of the German Democratic Republic and head of the People's Navy (Volksmarine)
- Epulon, king of the Histri
- Joakim Rakovac, guerrilla, activist, anti-fascist; he was killed in an ambush by the Nazis in WW2
- Licio Visintini, Italian naval officer during World War II; Silver Medal of Military Valor (twice) and Gold Medal of Military Valour
- Mario Visintini, MOVM, Italian naval officer during World War II, Gold Medal of Military Valour, nicknamed cacciatore scientifico (scientific fighter pilot)
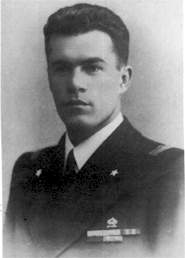
Licio Visintini

Mario Visintini

== Politics ==
- Luciano Delbianco, Mayor of Pula; successfully negotiated the peaceful removal of Yugoslav troops in the 1990s, saving the city from destruction
- Juraj Dobrila, Catholic bishop, printer and benefactor from Istria who advocated for greater national rights for Croats and also Slovenes in Istria under Austrian rule
- Valter Drandić, politician, member of the European Committee of the Regions, former Mayor of Pula and long-time member of the Croatian Parliament; Officer of the Order of the Star of Italy
- Fabio Filzi, Italian irredentist and patriot; Medal of Military Valor and War Merit Cross
- Andrei Glavina, writer, professor and politician
- Peđa Grbin, president of the Social Democratic Party of Croatia since 2020
- Silvano Hrelja, leader of the Croatian Pensioners' Party since 2008
- Ernest Jelušić, priest, revivalist of Croatian nationalism and politician
- Veli Jože, Istrian giant native of Motovun in the local folklore, and the protagonist of Vladimir Nazor's novel of the same name
- Radovan Juričić, Head of State Administration Office of Istria County, successfully negotiated the peaceful removal of Yugoslav troops from Pula in the 1990s
- Ioannis Kapodistrias, 1st Governor of Hellenic State, whose ancestry can be traced back to Koper (Capodistria), hence Kapodistrias
- Luka Kirac, priest, revivalist of Croatian nationalism and politician
- Šime Kurelić, politician and revivalist of Croatian nationalism
- Boris Miletić, Mayor of Pula and president of the Istrian Democratic Assembly (IDS) since 2014
- Francesco Neffat (Franjo Nefat), politician, anti-fascist, partisan, and Mayor of Pula
- Rossana Rossanda, journalist, politician and feminist, who co-founded Il manifesto
- Francesco Salata, Italian senator, Ambassador of Italy to Austria, journalist and author
- Nazario Sauro, sailor and Italian irredentis
- Vjekoslav Spinčić, author and politician, member of the Party of Rights and Croatian nationalist of the late 19th century
- Igor Štoković, Mayor of Pula, who successfully negotiated the peaceful removal of Yugoslav troops from Pula in the 1990s
- Vittorio Vidali, antifascist, senator of the Italian Republic
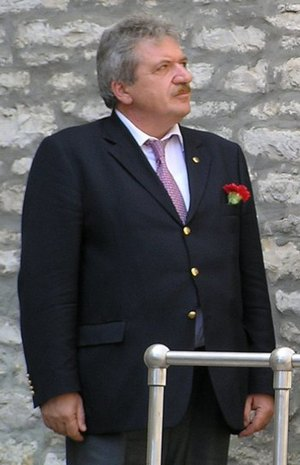
Delbianco

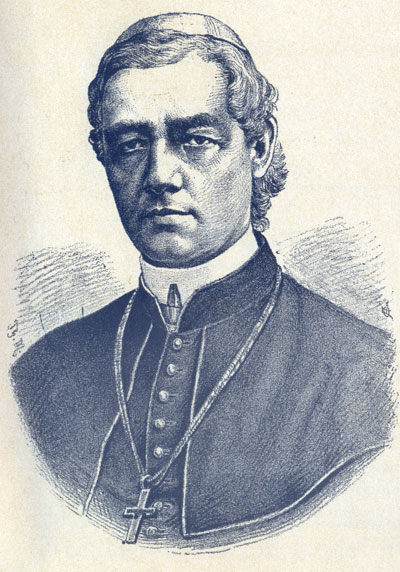
Dobrila

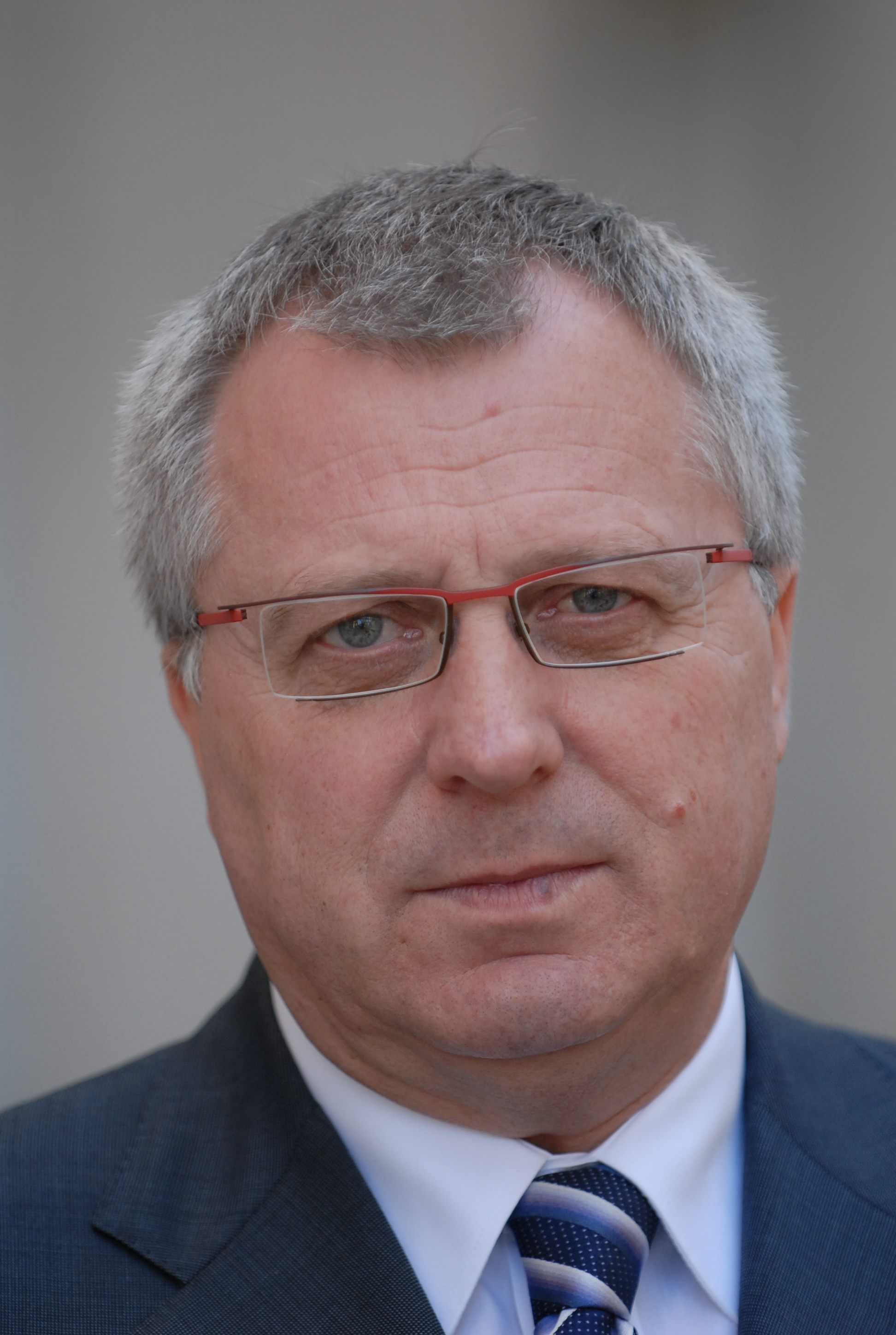
Drandić

Grbin

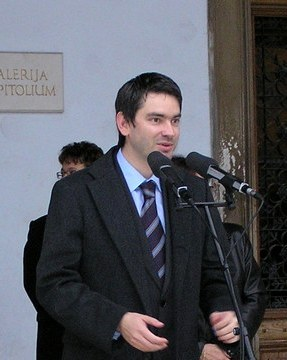
Miletić

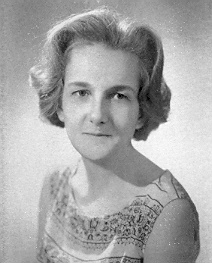
Rossanda

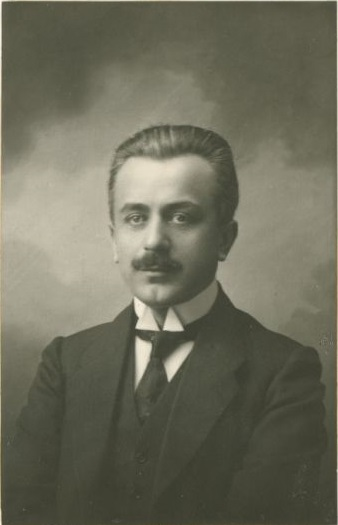
Salata

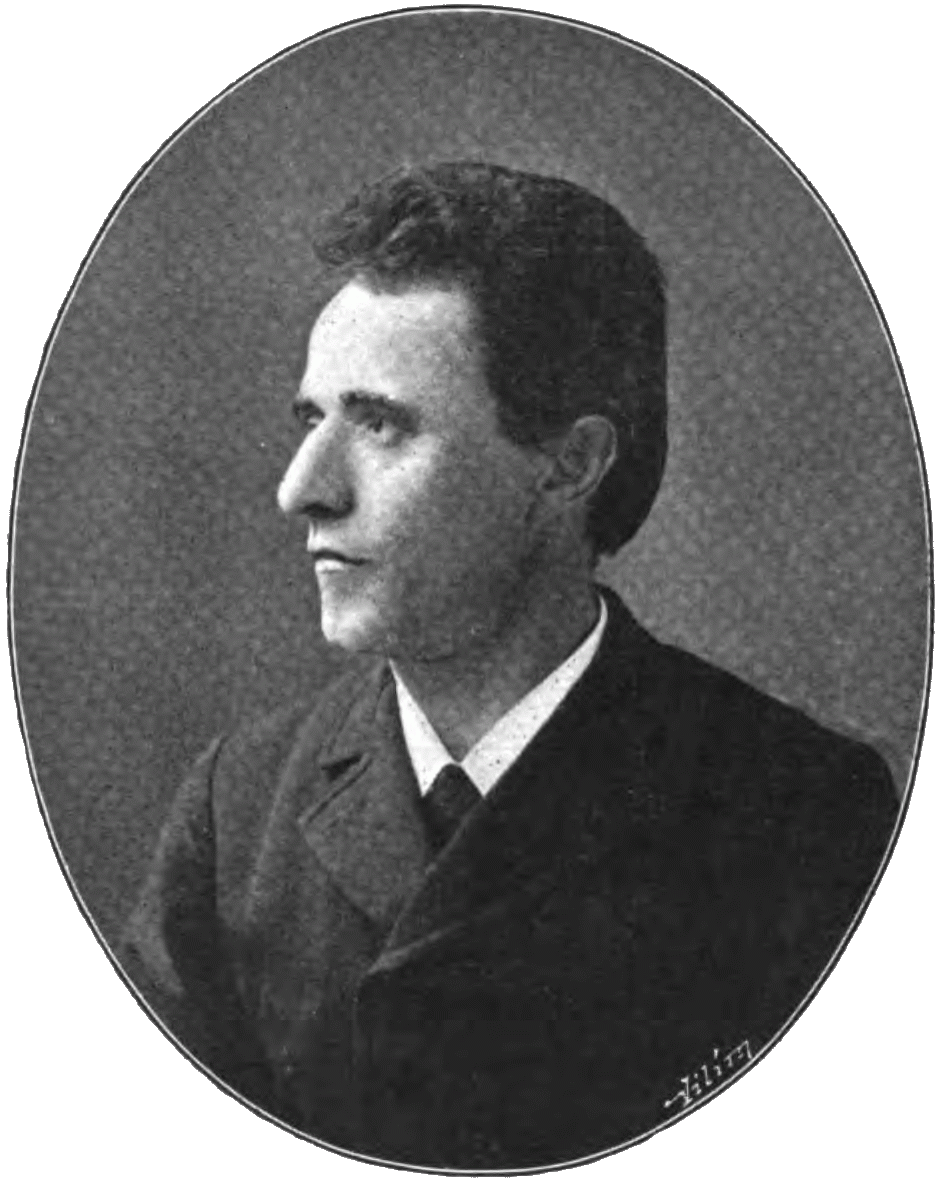
Spinčić

== Religion ==
=== Saints, Beati and Venerables in the Catholic Church ===
- Francesco Bonifacio, beato
- Miroslav Bulešić, one of Croatia's beati
- Egidio Bullesi (Bullessich), Venerable, the confirmation of his life of heroic virtue in 1997 allowed for Pope John Paul II to name him as Venerable
- Saint Gaudentius of Ossero, bishop of Ossero and patron of the town and the island
- Julian of Bale, one of Croatia's beati
- Oton of Pula, one of Croatia's beati
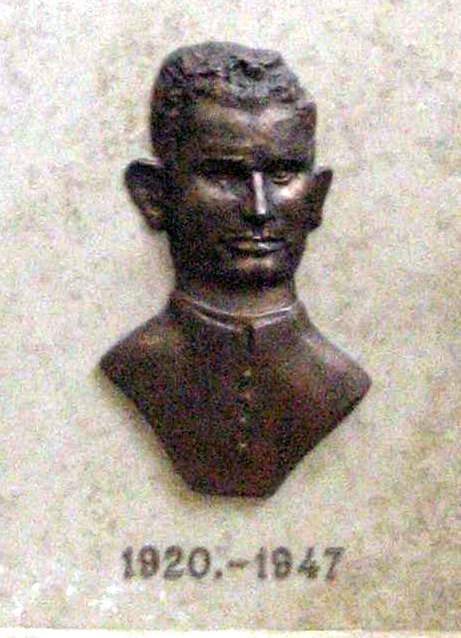
Blessed Bulešić

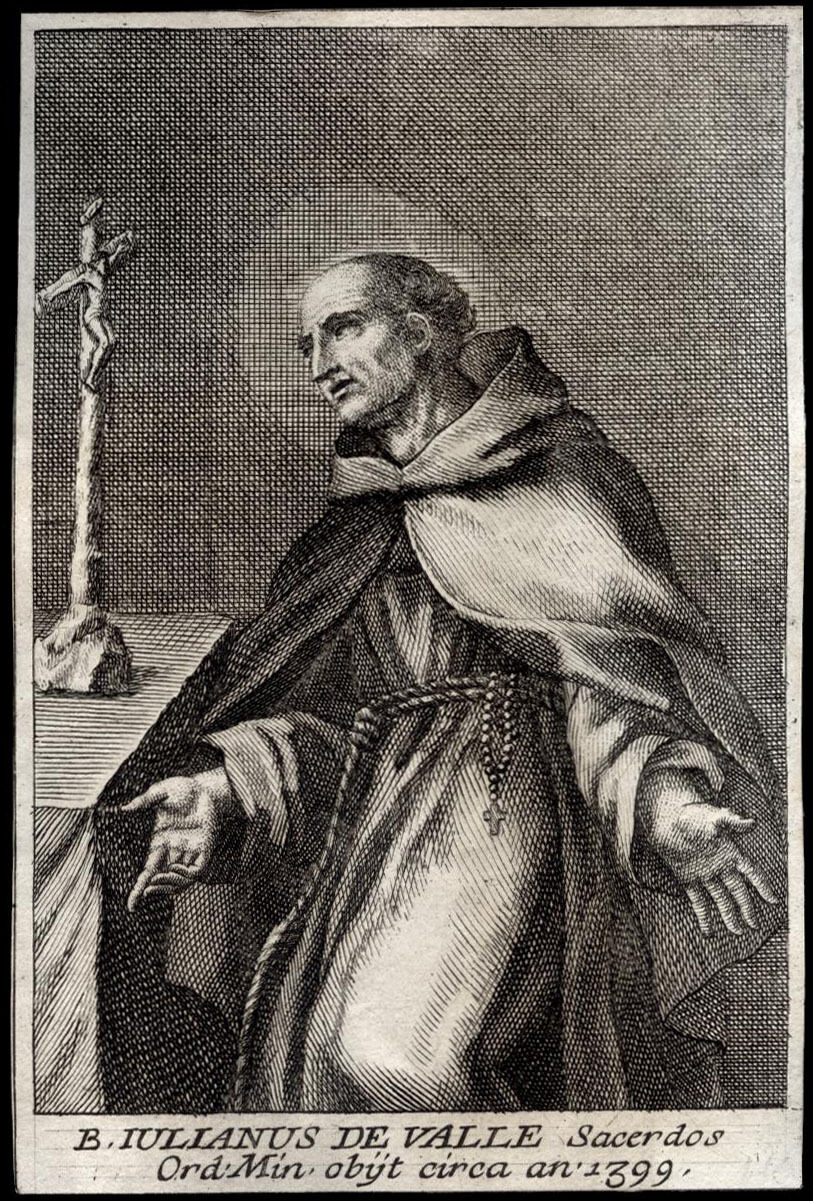
Julian of Bale

=== Roman Catholic bishops ===
- Maximianus, Bishop of Ravenna
- Josip Pavlišić, Bishop of Rijeka
- Isidoro Sain, the first Bishop of Rijeka
- Antonio Santin, Archbishop of Trieste, and the second Bishop of Rijeka
- Josip Ujčić, the second Archbishop of Belgrade

=== Reformers ===
- Juraj Cvečić, Protestant reformer, translator and editor
- Flacius (Matija Vlačić-Franković Ilirik), Lutheran reformer, pioneer in church historical studies, and "theological controversialist who created a lasting rift within Lutheranism"
- Matija Grbić (Garbitius), humanist, classical philologist, translator and protégé of Luther and Melanchthon, dean of the University of Tübingen 1545–1557; helped and promoted Flacius in Tübingen
- Stjepan Konzul Istranin, translator and reformer who translated the New Testament into Croatian and authored and translated religious books into Čakavian dialect.
- Sebastian Krelj, Protestant reformer, writer, pastor, linguist and preacher born in Vipava, modern day Slovenia
- Baldo Lupetina (Lupetino), reformer from Labin, who preached both in Chakavian dialect and Italian; was the uncle-in-law and mentor of Flacius; executed for heresy in Venice
- Pier Paolo Vergerio (Vergerij), protestant reformer
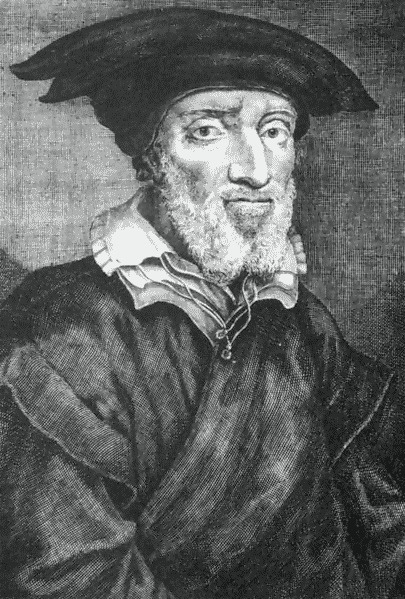
Flacius

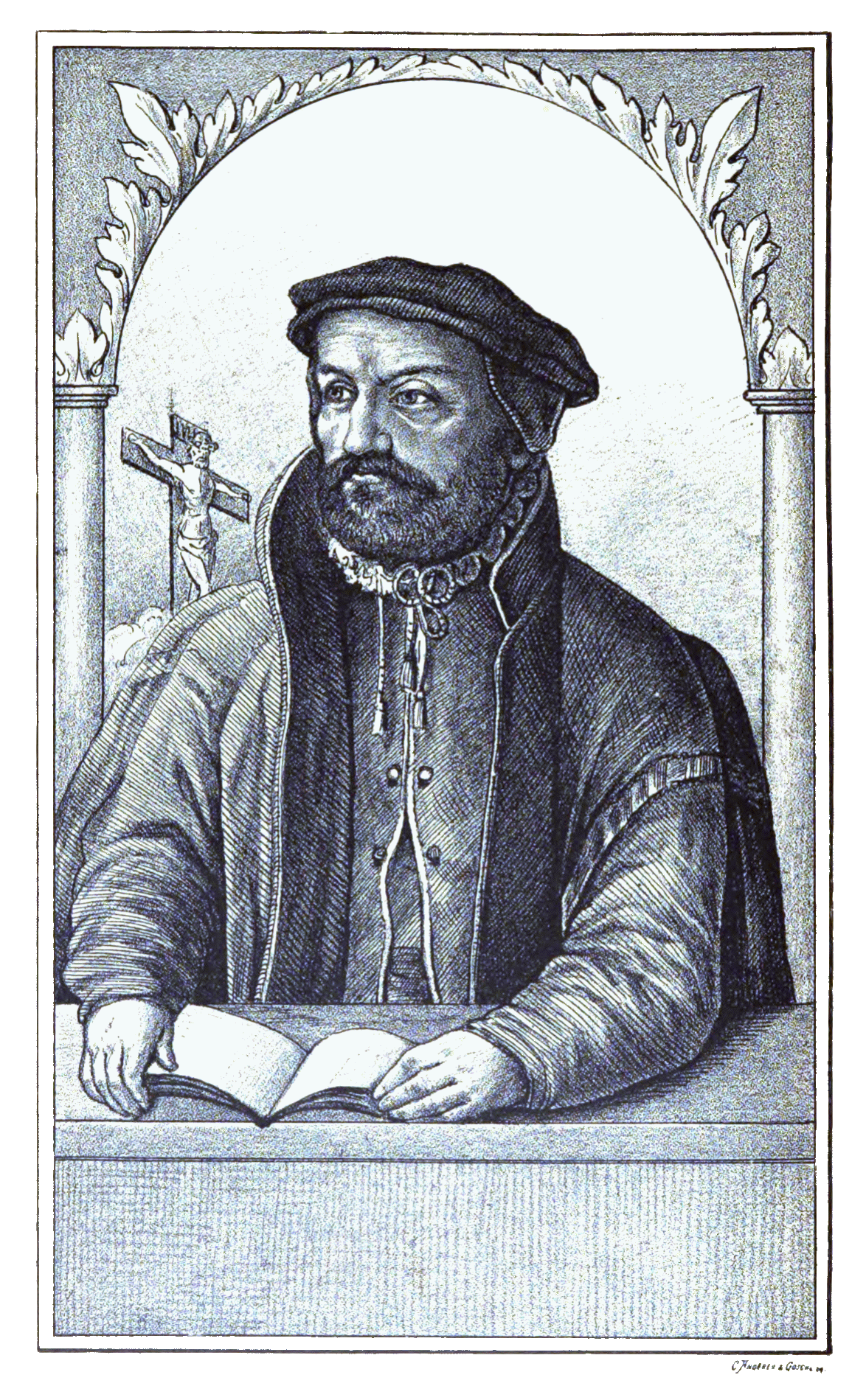
Konzul Istranin

=== Other ===
- Asher Lämmlein, 16th-century self-proclaimed forerunner of the Jewish messiah

== Sports ==
- Silvano Abbà, modern pentathlete who won a bronze medal at the 1936 Summer Olympics
- Jasmin Agić, former football player who played for Dinamo Zagreb and Croatia's national football team, son-in-law of Srećko Juričić
- Danijel Aleksić, footballer currently playing for İstanbul Başakşehir F.K. and Serbia national football team; individually he won a UEFA European Under-17 Championship Golden Player Award in 2008; with clubs he won the 2019–20 Süper Lig
- Mario Andretti, former racing driver; won the Formula One Championship in 1978
- Andretti family, John, Jeff, Michael and his son Marco all competed in major racing championships and sports races. Most notably, Michael won a CART championship, and a 3rd place at the 1993 Italian F1 Grand Prix. They all descend from Istrian-Italian immigrant to the U.S. Mario Andretti.
- Nino Benvenuti, boxer, won gold at the 1960 Summer Olympics and two European Amateur Championships, and as a professional the EBU Middleweight Title and the WBA and WBC super welterweight and middleweight titles
- Lorena Beučić, former handball player, played for the Yugoslav national team; won the 1977 Junior World Championship with Yugoslavia
- Mark Bresciano, former professional footballer and one of the most capped players for Australia, born to a Croatian Istrian mother in Melbourne
- Mario Brnjac, footballer, one of the key defenders for Rijeka during much of the 1960s and the early 1970s
- Damir Burić, water polo player, won the gold with Croatia at the 2012 Summer Olympics, and the silver at the 2016 Summer Olympics
- Giovanni Cernogoraz, sports shooter, won the gold at the 2012 Summer Olympics in Men's trap
- Lino Červar, former handball coach; in 2003 guided Croatia men's national handball team to a gold at the 2003 World Championship; won the gold at the 2004 Olympics; won two silvers at the World Cup, three silvers and two bronzes at the Europeans, one gold and two bronzes at the Mediterranean Games
- Giovanni Delise, rower who won a gold medal at the 1928 Summer Olympics together with Giliante D'Este, Renato Petronio and Nicolò Vittori. They were all from Isola (Izola), and won also several European Championships.
- Giliante D'Este, won gold medal in 1928 with the Isola team; won bronze medal at the 1932 Summer Olympics (coxless four)
- Luigi De Manincor, sailor, won a gold medal at the 1936 Summer Olympics
- Samanta Fabris, volleyball player, won an Italian League with Imoco Volley, the 2018 Mediterranean Games with Croatia, as well as a bronze at the 2013 Mediterranean Games and silver at the 2019 European League
- Evelina Galo, former handball player, played for Yugoslavia's national handball team
- Suzana Golja, former handball player, played for the Croatian national team
- Dario Hübner, former football player, became the oldest Serie A Capocannoniere in the 2001–02 Serie A
- Valner Franković, former handball player;won two Croatian Premier Leagues and two Cups with RK Zagreb, with which he reached the 1995 final of the Champions League
- Matea Ikić, volleyball player, currently playing for Kuzeyboru Spor Kulübü and the Croatian national team
- Vinko Jelovac, Yugoslav basketball player; with Yugoslavia he won the 1970 World Cup, as well as the 1973, 1975, and 1977 EuroBasket; won the 1971 Mediterranean Games, and a silver at the 1976 Summer Olympics
- Željko Jerkov, former basketball player; represented Yugoslavia at the 1976 and 1980 Summer Olympics, winning a silver and a gold, respectively; won the 1978 FIBA World Championship in the Philippines, as well as three EuroBaskets
- Gordana Jurcan, former volleyball player, won the 1993 Mediterranean Games with Croatia, as well as a silver at the 1995 European Championship; with Rijeka she won two Croatian Leagues and two Cups
- Igor Jurković, The Istrian Warrior, heavyweight kickboxer, six times Croatian national champion, winner of K-1 Le Grand Tournoi in Paris and FFC Light Heavyweight World Champion, once ranked #8 in the world
- Srećko Juričić, former football player, won two Yugoslav Cups with HNK Rijeka, considered one of Rijeka's greatest players of all time; currently the sporting director of HNK Rijeka
- Karmen Kokot, former handball player, played for Yugoslavia women's national handball team
- Igor Marenić, professional sailor, won the gold at the 2016 Summer Olympics; the 2009 World Championships, and three European Championships (2009, 2011, 2012)
- Matjaž Markič, swimmer who won several medals at the European Championships, and a bronze at the 2005 Mediterranean Games
- Fran Mileta, handball player playing for Nexe and Croatia's national team
- Anđelo Milevoj, former football player widely regarded as HNK Rijeka's best defender of all time
- Diego Modrušan, former handball player for the Croatian national team; won the gold at the 2001 Mediterranean Games with Croatia
- Tereza Mrdeža, tennis player
- Alvaro Načinović, former handball player born in Rijeka, (Note: Načinović is a surname that originates from Labin, Istria. Today, the surname is still most prevalent in Istria.) who represented both Croatia and Yugoslavia; won a bronze at the 1988 Summer Olympics; representing Croatia he won the gold at the 1996 Summer Olympics, a silver at the 1995 World Cup and a bronze at the 1994 Euro Cup
- Sandro Nicević, basketball player, won a silver with Croatia at the FIBA U18 European Championship; played at EuroBasket 1997, EuroBasket 2003, EuroBasket 2009, and represented Croatia at the 2008 Olympics
- Ornela Paliska, former handball player, won the 1977 Women's Junior World Handball Championship with Yugoslavia
- Abdon Pamich, race walker born in Rijeka (Fiume) (Note: Although Pamich was born in Fiume and competed for Italy, Pamić is a surname typical of Istria, originating from Pazin. Other notable Istrians with this surname include international footballer Igor Pamić, his son Zvonko, his late son Alen, and his nephew Manuel) who won the gold medal at the 1964 Summer Olympics competing for Italy
- Igor Pamić, former football player, played for the Croatian national football team
- Mate Parlov, boxer, European Amateur Champion in 1971 and 1973; World Amateur Champion in 1974, and gold medalist at the 1912 Summer Olympicsl as a professional, he won the EBU Light Heavyweight title in 1976, and the WBC Light Heavyweight Title in 1978; born in Split, but raised in Pula, where he moved in his childhood
- Toni Perković, basketball player playing for Split and Croatia's national football team
- Adriana Prosenjak, former handball player, played for both Yugoslavia and the Croatian national team; first captain of Croatia, winning the 1993 Mediterranean Games; named best player of Croatia in 1993, and also won the Croatian and Italian club championships and the 1991 EHF Cup
- Andrej Prskalo, football player playing for HNK Rijeka and Croatia's national football team
- Mladen Prskalo, former handball player, played for the Croatian national team
- Rene Sain, volleyball player, currently playing for RC Cannes and the Croatian national team; won the 2018 Mediterranean Games with Croatia, and a silver at the 2019 European League
- Ingrid Siscovich, former volleyball player, won a silver at the 1997 Junior European Championship and a silver at the 1999 European Championship representing Croatia
- Damir Skomina, UEFA Elite category football referee, officiated at the 2017 UEFA Europa League Final and the 2019 UEFA Champions League Final
- Simon Sluga, professional footballer currently playing for Luton and the Croatian national team
- Giovanni Steffè, rower, won silver medal at the 1948 Summer Olympics in coxed pair
- Agostino Straulino, sailor; together with Nicolò Rode, won a gold and a silver medal at the Summer Olympics
- Roberto Sošić, former handball player, played for the Yugoslav national team
- Luka Stepančić, handball player, competed for Croatia in the 2013, 2015, 2017 and 2019 World Championships, as well as the 2018 and 2020 European Championships, winning the silver in 2020; represented Croatia at the 2016 Summer Olympics, won the Croatian and French championships, and reached the final of the Champions League with PSG
- Vanja Udovičić, Serbian water polo player, Ministry of Youth and Sports of Serbia, who won several medals at the summer Olympics, several European Championships, and two World Championships; father was from Istria, both of Slavic and Italian descent
- Sven Ušić, Yugoslav basketball player; represented Yugoslavia at EuroBasket 1985, playing eight games
- Gašper Vinčec, sailor who won a bronze at the 2007 World Championships
- Antonio Vojak, professional footballer who played for Juventus FC and Naples; won the 1925–26 Serie A with Juventus, and with 102 goals with Naples is the club's top goalscorer of all time
- Vasilij Žbogar, sailor born in Koper; won two silvers and a bronze at the Olympic Games
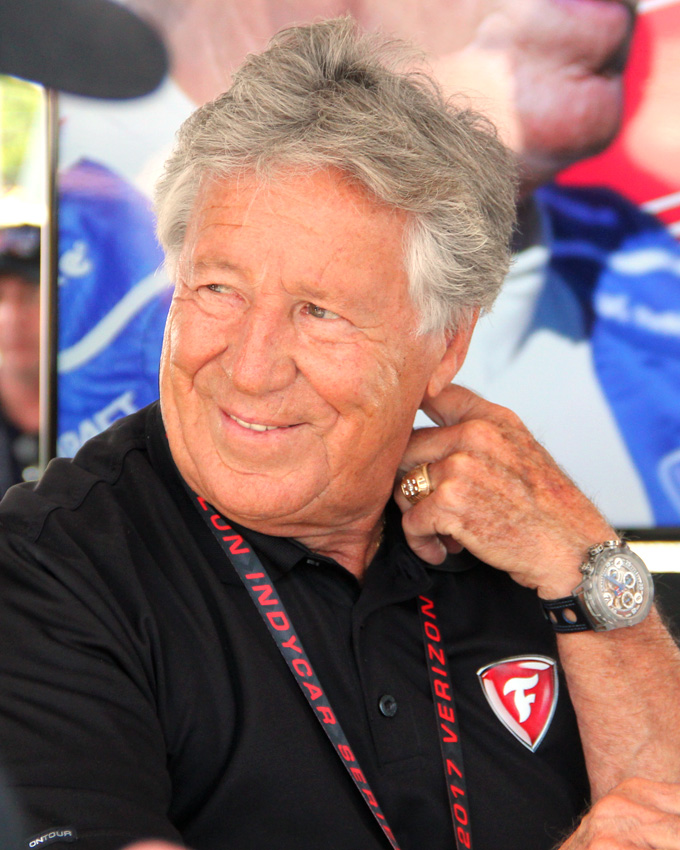
Andretti

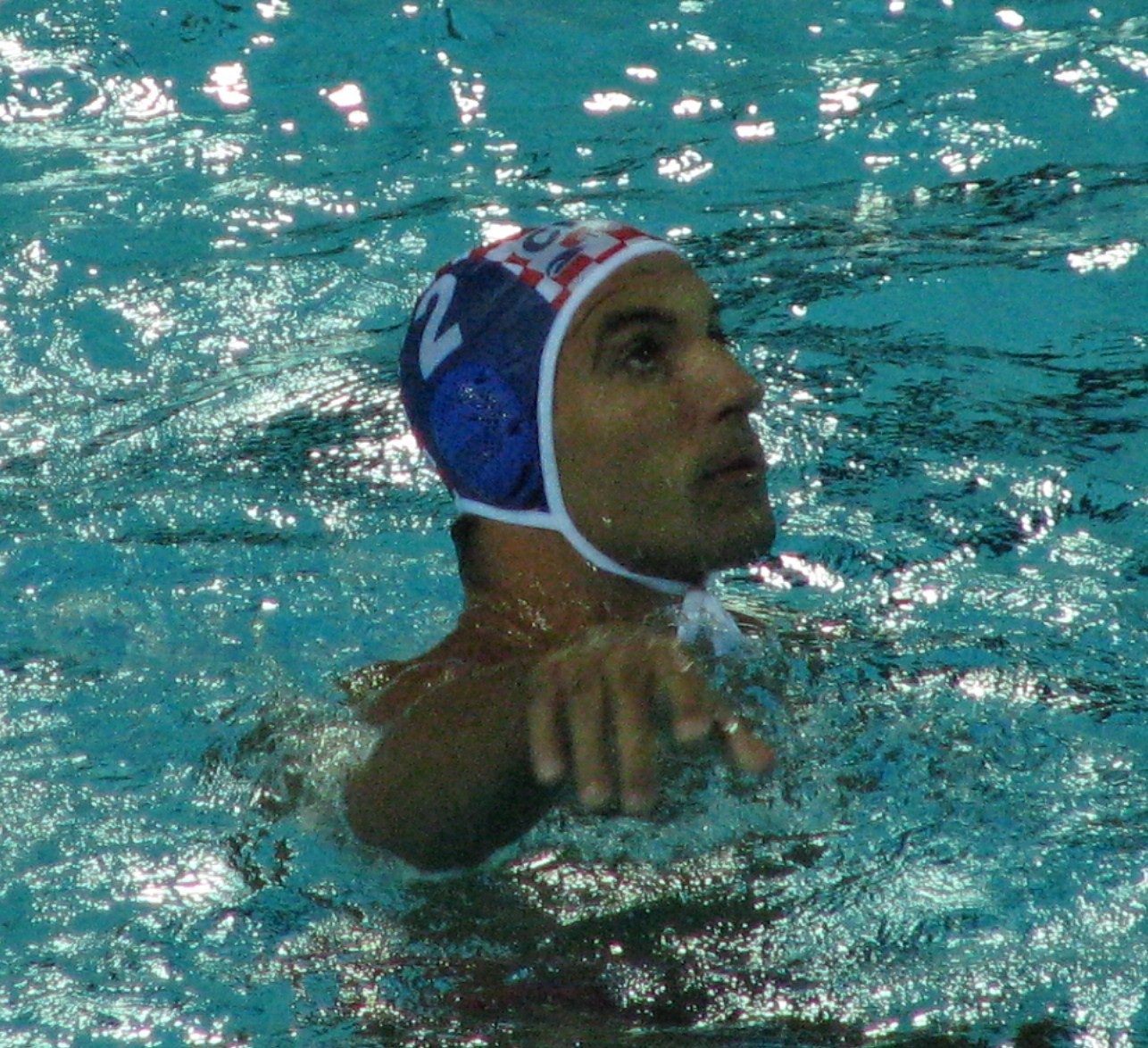
Burić

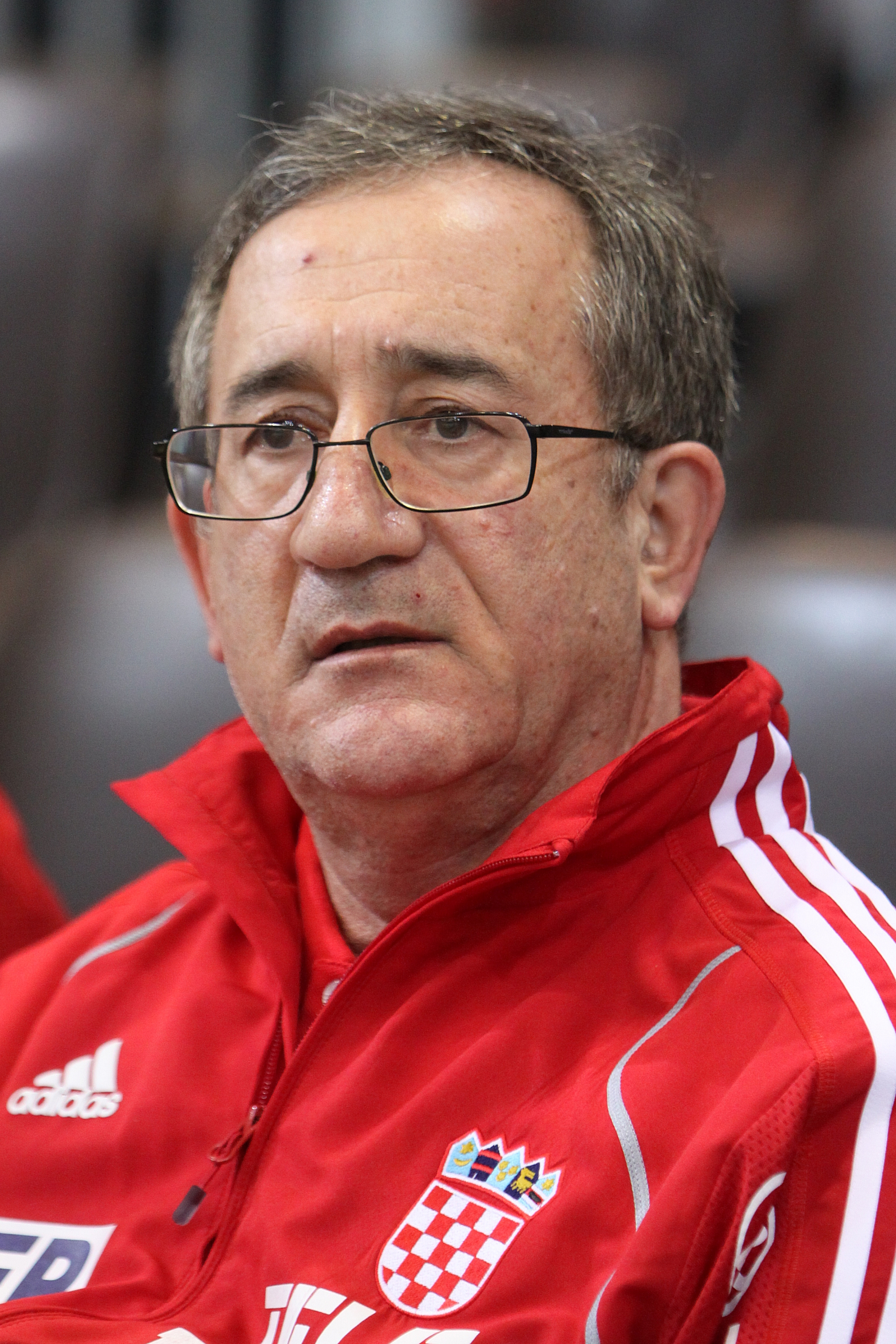
Červar

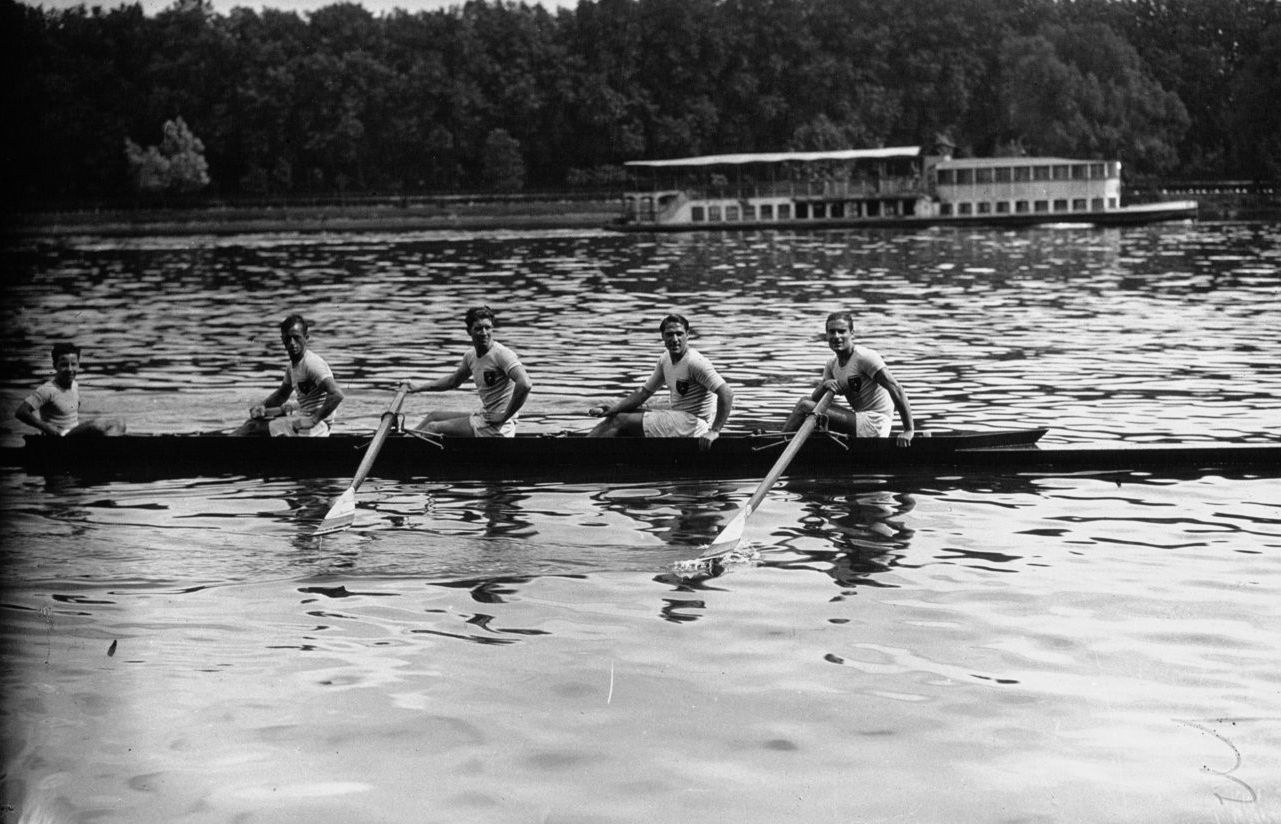
D'Este

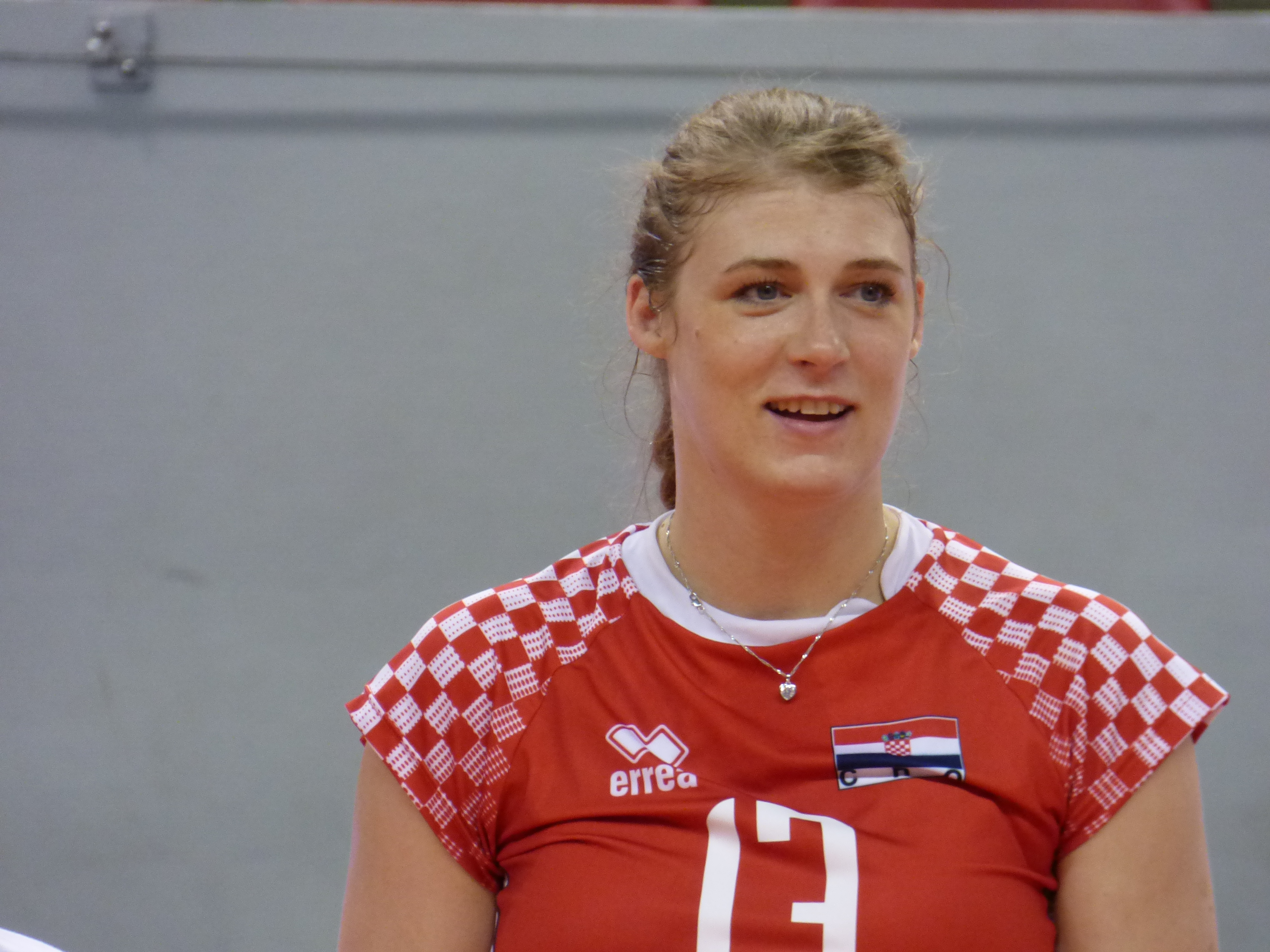
Fabris

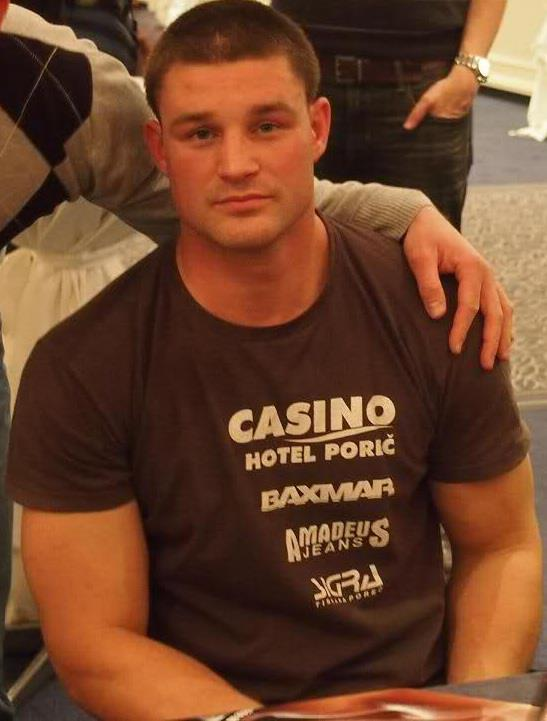
Jurković

Nicević

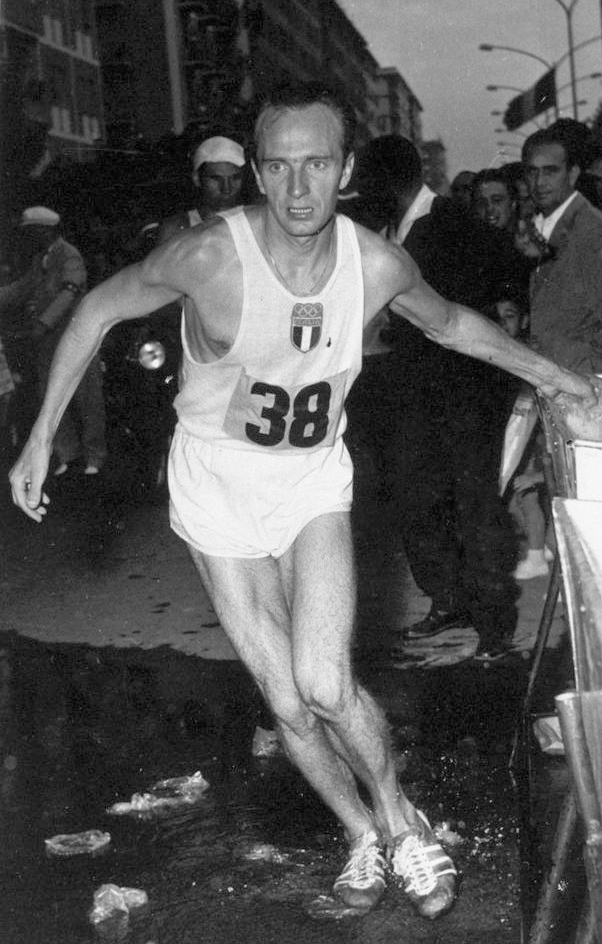
Pamich

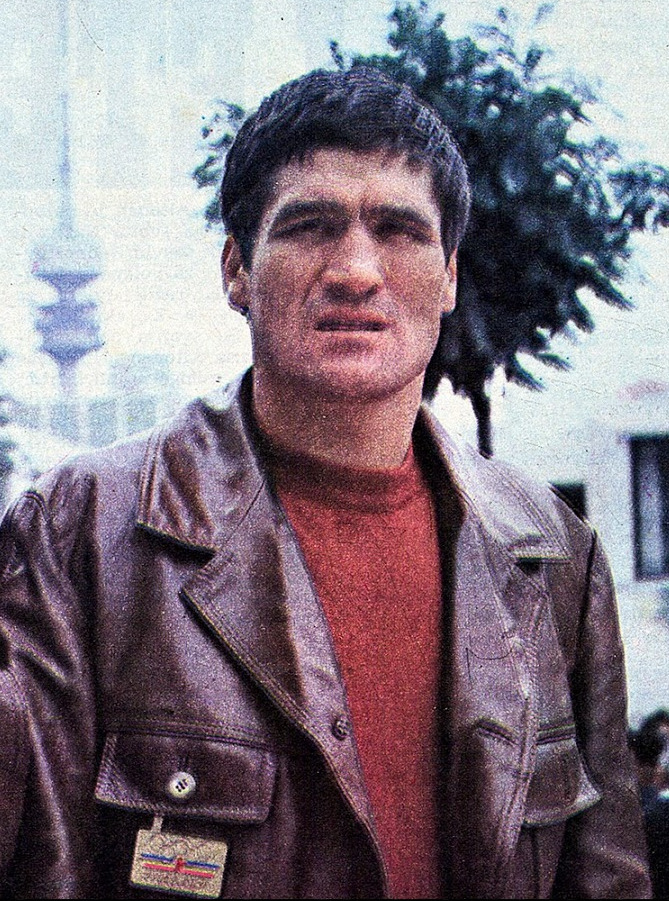
Parlov

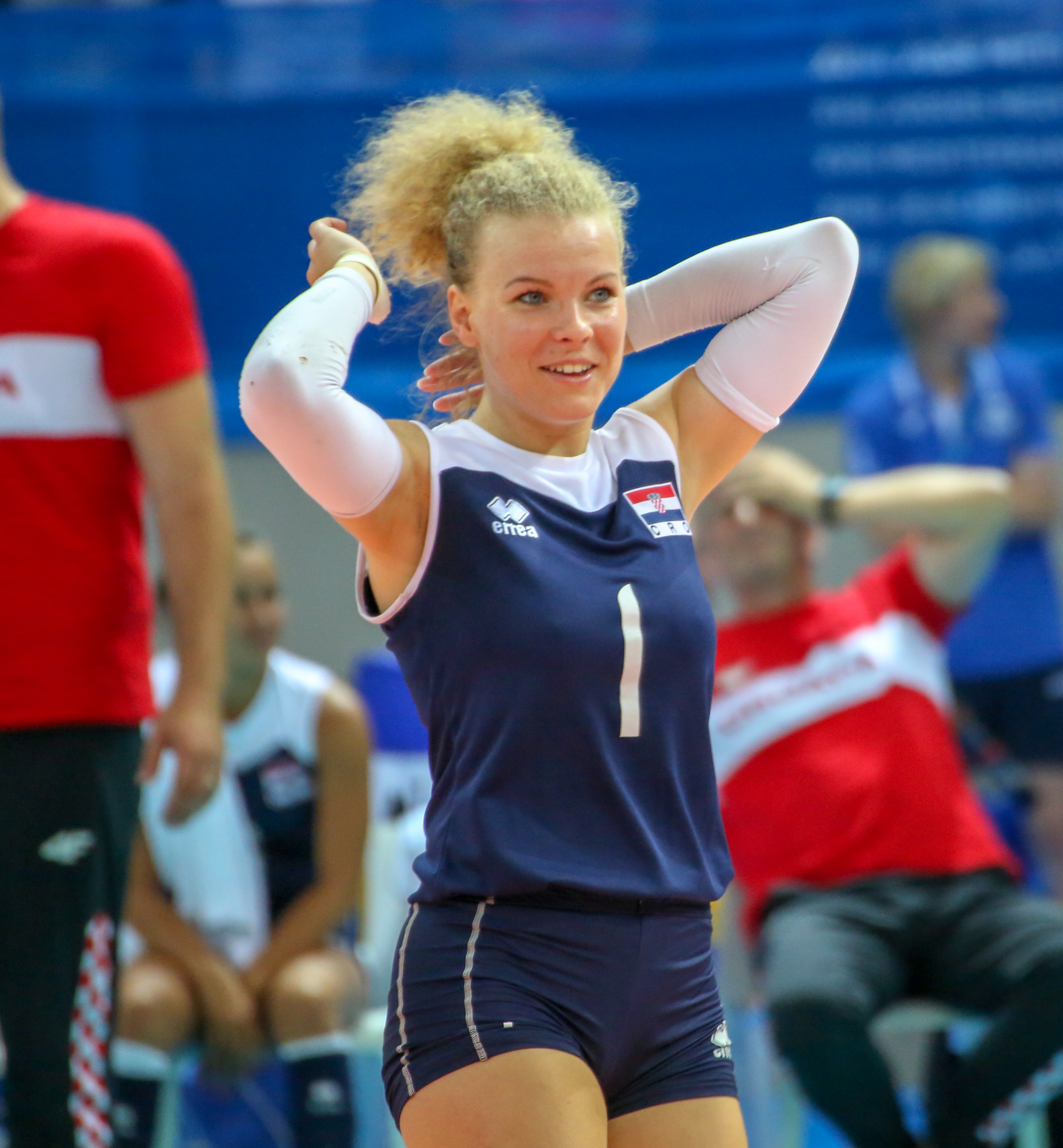
Sain

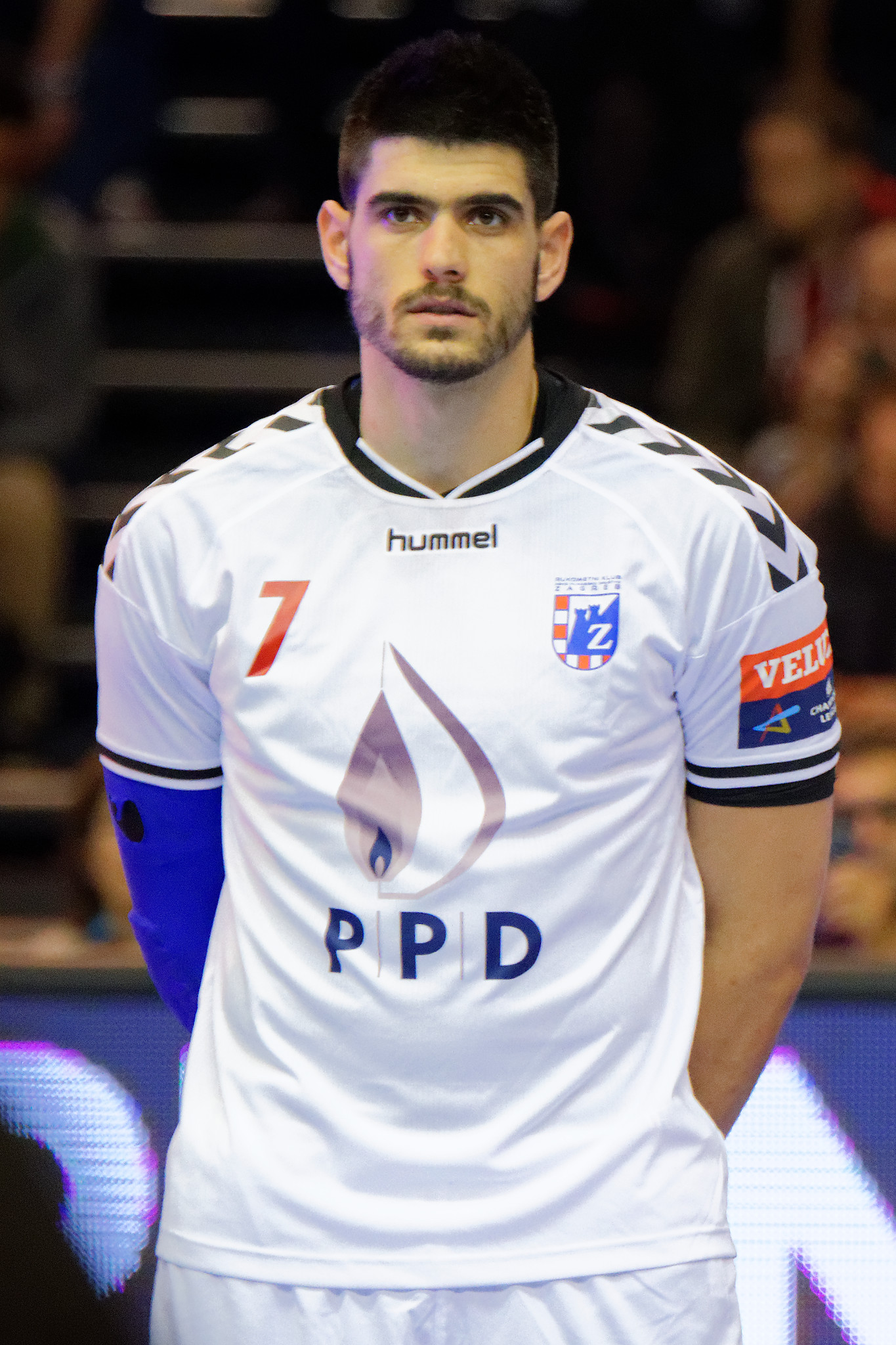
Stepančić
