= List of prefects of Istria County =

This is a list of prefects of Istria County.

== Prefects of Istria County (1993–present) ==
Istrian Democratic Forum (IDF)
Istrian Democratic Assembly (IDS)

No.	Portrait	Name (Born–Died)	Term of Office		Party
1		Luciano Delbianco (1954–2014)	4 May 1993	23 January 1997	IDF
2		Stevo Žufić (1951–)	23 January 1997	24 July 2001	IDS
3		Ivan Jakovčić (1957–)	24 July 2001	7 June 2013	IDS
4		Valter Flego (1972–)	7 June 2013	6 July 2019	IDS
5		Fabrizio Radin (1959–)	6 July 2019	11 June 2021	IDS
6		Boris Miletić (1975–)	11 June 2021	Incumbent	IDS
6		Boris Miletić (1975–)	11 June 2021	Incumbent	Ind.

== See also ==
- Istria County
