= Jelušić =

Jelušić is a South Slavic surname.

Notable people with the name include:

- Ana Jelušić (born 1986), Croatian skier
- Ernest Jelušić (1863–1910), Croatian priest and politician
- Tatjana Aparac-Jelušić (born 1948), Croatian librarian
- Veselin Jelušić, Serbian football manager

== See also ==
- Jelusić
