= Chief Executive of Pula =

List of officials of Pula, Croatia

- Coat of arms

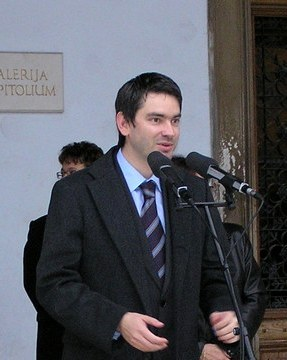
- Incumbent; Boris Miletić
- Residence: Communal Palace
- Appointer: Serenissima Signoria; Habsburg Monarch; French Republic; Austrian Empire; Kingdom of Italy; Yugoslavia; Croatia
- Formation: 1186
- First holder: Andrea

The following is a list of all 422 of the Chief Executives of Pula ordered by the dates of their mayoral terms which are put in parentheses.

Pula has a complex history, as the city was governed by different countries with different forms of government in different epochs.

In classical antiquity, Pula was inhabited by the Histri, a Venetic or Illyrian tribe. It was conquered by the Romans in 177 BC, whereafter followed a period of Romanization. The town was elevated to colonial rank between 46 and 45 BC as the tenth region of the Roman Republic, under Julius Caesar. In the 5th century it was conquered and occupied by the Visigoths and then Ostrogoths. In the second half of the 6th century the Slavs started their occupation of the Istrian peninsula. From 788 Pula was ruled by the Franks, who introduced the feudal system.

In 1150 Pula swore allegiance to the Republic of Venice. In the following centuries, Pula was devastated by war and epidemics. As a result of its decimated population and ruined economy, the city fell into disrepute. However, the town was saved by organized Croatian and South-Slav settling. After a small period under the secular realm of the Patriarchate of Aquileia, the city was retaken by the Venetians, who held it from 1331 until 1797. With the collapse of the Venetian Republic in 1797 following Napoleon's Treaty of Campo Formio, Pula became part of the Habsburg monarchy. It was invaded again in 1805 after the French had defeated the Austrians. It was included in the French Empire of Napoleon as part of the Kingdom of Italy, then placed under the French Empire's Illyrian Provinces.

In 1813, Pula was regained by the Austrian Empire. Following the collapse of Austria-Hungary in 1918, Pula passed to Italy. For two years after World War 2, Pula was administered by the Allied Military Government for Occupied Territories (AMG). Pula formed an enclave within southern Istria that was occupied by Yugoslavia since 1945, with the help of Churchill. Istria was partitioned into occupation zones until the region became officially united with the Socialist Federal Republic of Yugoslavia on 15 September 1947, under terms of the Paris Peace Treaties. Since the collapse of Yugoslavia in 1991, Pula has been part of the Republic of Croatia.

The list starts with the podestà appointed by the Serenissima during the Venetian period. It includes all the podestà, provveditori, counts and mayors who have governed the city since 1186.

== 12th century ==
- Andrea (1186)
- Odolricus (1194)
- Ruggero Morosini, podestà (1199)

== 13th century ==
- Giovanni della Torre, podestà (1220)
- Giovanni de Rosa, podestà (1223)
- Reniero Zeno, podestà (1225)
- Marino Mauroceno, Count of Pula and podestà (1226)
- Nassinguerra Sergi, podestà (1233)
- Nassinverra Sergi, podestà (1242)
- Galvagnus Sergi, podestà (1251)
- Sergio Castropola, capitano del popolo (1265)
- Nicolaus Quirinus, podestà (1272)
- Nicolò da Pola, capitano del popolo (1289)
- Martino della Torre, podestà (1293 - 1294)
- Bartolomeo dei Vitrei, podestà (1296)
- Pagano della Torre, podestà (1297)
- Giovanni Soranzo, podestà (1299–1300)

== 14th century ==
- Monfiorito da Coderta, podestà (1304–1305)
- Pietro de Castropola, chief consul and captain general (1305)
- Sergio II Castropola, captain (1312)
- Sergio II Catropola e Nassinguerra IV Castropola, general and capitano perpetuo (1313)
- Sergio II Castropola e Nassinguerra IV Castropola, captain of the city (1318)
- Giovanni Querini, podestà (1319)
- G. Morosini, podestà (1326–1327)
- Giorgio Baseggio, podestà (1328)
- Orso Giustiniani, podestà (1330)
- Pietro Viti and Biaggio Dettacomandi, capitani del popolo (1331)
- Tomaso Contarini, consul (1331)
- Bertuccio Michiel, Count of Pula (1331–1332)
- Pietro Civran, Count of Pula (1332–1333)
- Giovanni Caroso, Count of Pula (1333–1334)
- Giovanni Valaresso, Count of Pula (1334)
- Paolo Diedo, Count of Pula (1335)
- Pietro Bragadin, Count of Pula (1336)
- Giovanni Bragadin, Count of Pula (1336)
- Damiano Natale, Count of Pula (1338–1339)
- Marco Mercuzio Duodo, Count of Pula (1339–1340)
- Ordelaffo Falier, Count of Pula (1340–1341)
- Michele Giustinian, Count of Pula (1341–1342)
- Tomaso Gradenigo, Count of Pula (1342–1343)
- Filippo da Molin, Count of Pula (1341–1344)
- Marco Morosini, Count of Pula (1344–1345)
- Andrea Morosini, Count of Pula (1347–1348)
- Marino Badoer, Count of Pula (1348–1349)
- Andreolo Badoer, Count of Pula (1349–1350)
- Giovanni Caroso, Count of Pula (1350–1351)
- Andrea Zane, Count of Pula (1351–1352)
- Nicolò Zeno, Count of Pula (1352–1353)
- Giovanni Zorzi, Count of Pula (1353–1354)
- Zuane Legoveli, Count of Pula (1356)
- Pietro Corner, Count of Pula (1361–1362)
- Andrea Loredan, Count of Pula (1362–1363)
- Ermolao Darmer (Dalmario), Count of Pula (1363–1364)
- Vittore Pisani, Count of Pula (1364)
- Dardo Polani, Count of Pula (1364)
- Andrea Loredan, Count of Pula (1364)
- Andrea Gradenigo, Count of Pula (1365)
- Bertuccio Corner, Count of Pula (1365)
- Marin Sanudo, Count of Pula (1366)
- Francesco Venier, Count of Pula (1367)
- Francesco Zane, Count of Pula (1372)
- Marco Corner, Count of Pula (1373)
- Francesco Venier, Count of Pula (1376)
- Domenico Bon, Count of Pula (1377)
- Giovanni Diedo, Count of Pula (1378)
- Maffeo Contarini, Count of Pula (1380)
- Artico da Udine, governor and captain (1381)
- Angelo Bragadin, captain and rector (1381)
- Andrea Loredan, Count of Pula (1381–1382)
- Pietro Venier, Count of Pula (1383–1384)
- Andrea Paradiso, Count of Pula (1384–1385)
- Nicolò Foscarini, Count of Pula (1385–1386)
- Domenico Bon, Count of Pula (1386–1388)
- Giovanni Moro, Count of Pula (1391–1394)
- Jacopo Valaresso, Count of Pula (1396)
- Giovanni Moro, Count of Pula (1398)

== 15th century ==
- Giacomo Zorzi, Count of Pula (1400)
- Ranieri Venier, Count of Pula (1401–1402)
- Marco Badoer, Count of Pula (1402–1403)
- Bernardo Pisani, Count of Pula (1404)
- Pietro Miani, Count of Pula (1408)
- Mosè Grimani, Count of Pula (1412–1413)
- Nicolò Barbo, Count of Pula (1413–1414)
- Cristofaro Marcello, Count of Pula (1414–1415)
- Andrea Loredan, Count of Pula (1415–1416)
- Andrea Loredan, Count of Pula (1418)
- Leone Moro, Count of Pula (1418)
- Biagio Venier, Count of Pula (1418–1419)
- Bernardo Sagredo, Count of Pula (1420–1421)
- Matteo Barbaro, Count of Pula (1422–1423)
- Bartolomeo Vetturi, Count of Pula (1423–1424)
- Giacomo Priuli, Count of Pula (1424–1425)
- Giovanni Balbi, Count of Pula (1425–1426)
- Bertuccio Gabriel, Count of Pula (1426–1427)
- Pietro Morosini, Count of Pula (1427–1428)
- Nicolò Arimondo, Count of Pula (1428–1429)
- Matteo Manolesso, Count of Pula (1429)
- Nicolò Raimondo (Arimondo), Count of Pula (1429)
- Giusto Venier, Count of Pula (1431)
- Marco Navagier, Count of Pula (1432)
- Benedetto Barbaro, Count of Pula (1433)
- Benedetto Barozzi, Count of Pula (1433–1434)
- Giovanni Dolfin, Count of Pula (1435)
- Matteo Gradenigo, Count of Pula (1437)
- Benedetto da Mula, Count of Pula (1439)
- Giacomo Priuli, Count of Pula (1439)
- Nicolò Arimondo, Count of Pula (1439–1440)
- Leone Viaro, Count of Pula (1441)
- Antonio Condulmer, Count of Pula (1442–1443)
- Michele Leon, Count of Pula (1443)
- Giacomo Priuli, Count of Pula (1444–1445)
- Michel Caotorta, Count of Pula (1445–1446)
- Trojano Bon, Count of Pula (1446–1447)
- Marco Barbaro, Count of Pula (1447–1448)
- Lorenzo Gradenigo, Count of Pula (1448–1449)
- Benedetto Soranzo, Count of Pula (1450–1452)
- Lodovico Alvise Venier, Count of Pula (1452–1453)
- Alvise Morosini, Count of Pula (1453–1454)
- Pietro Zen, Count of Pula (1455–1456)
- Marin Balbi, Count of Pula (1456–1458)
- Marco Barbaro, Count of Pula (1458)
- Paolo da Riva, Count of Pula (1459)
- Giovanni Zulian, Count of Pula (1461)
- Pietro Gabriel, Count of Pula (1462)
- Bertuccio Gabriel, Count of Pula (1462–1463)
- Francesco Leon, Count of Pula (1463–1464)
- Federico Valaresso, Count of Pula (1465)
- Francesco Barbo, Count of Pula (1466)
- Giacomo Zorzi, Count of Pula (1468)
- Troilo Malipiero, Count of Pula (1469–1471)
- Leonardo de Ca' da Pesaro, Count of Pula (1471)
- Priamo Contarini, Count of Pula (1472)
- Massimo Valier, Count of Pula (1474)
- Francesco Bondumier, Count of Pula (1475)
- Michele Emo, Count of Pula (1477)
- Pietro Gritti, Count of Pula(1478)
- Pietro Corner, Count of Pula (1479)
- Marino Boldù, Count of Pula (1481)
- Fantin Valaresso, Count of Pula (1482–1483)
- Giovanni Battista Calbo, Count of Pula (1484)
- Marin Corner, Count of Pula (1486)
- Pietro Guoro, Count of Pula (1487)
- Stefano Priuli, Count of Pula (1488)
- Andrea Malipiero, Count of Pula (1489)
- Giovan Francesco Marcello, Count of Pula (1493)
- Alvise Zorzi, Count of Pula (1494)
- Andrea Diedo, Count of Pula (1494)
- Marco Tron, Count of Pula (1496)
- Bortolo Calbo, Count of Pula (1497)
- Marco Navager, Count of Pula (1499–1500)

== 16th century ==
- Lorenzo Gisi, Count of Pula (1500)
- Fantin Pesaro, Count of Pula (1501–1502)
- Francesco da Canal, Count of Pula (1503–1504)
- Giovan Francesco Badoer, Count of Pula (1504–1506)
- Antonio Venier, Count of Pula (1506–1507)
- Vincenzo Salamon, Count of Pula (1507)
- Francesco Zane, Count of Pula (1508–1510)
- Giovanni Zorzi, Count of Pula (1510)
- Giovanni Bolani (1512)
- Giovanni Bragadin, Count of Pula (1513)
- Antonio Badoer, Count of Pula (1515)
- Nicolò Dolfin, Count of Pula (1516)
- Giacomo Zen, Count of Pula (1518)
- Alvise Salamon, Count of Pula (1519)
- Carlo Bembo, Count of Pula (1521)
- Leonardo Loredan, Count of Pula (1522–1524)
- Pietro Contarini, Count of Pula (1527)
- Pietro Salamon, Count of Pula (1528)
- Giovan Francesco Balbi, Count of Pula (1529)
- Cristofaro Civran, Count of Pula (1530)
- Michel Quirini, Count of Pula (1532)
- Marc'Antonio Zorzi, Count of Pula (1533)
- Alvise Morosini, Count of Pula (1534)
- Bernardo Morosini, Count of Pula (1535–1536)
- Benedetto Balbi, Count of Pula (1536–1537)
- Marin Bragadin, Count of Pula (1537–1538)
- Gabriel Zorzi, Count of Pula (1539)
- Alvise Morosini, Count of Pula (1540)
- Daniel Quirino, Count of Pula (1541)
- Carlo Zen, Count of Pula (1543–1544)
- Leonardo Pisani, Count of Pula (1544–1545)
- Marc'Antonio Emiliani, Count of Pula (1545)
- Marc'Antonio Paruta, Count of Pula (1547)
- Gerolamo Calbo, Count of Pula (1548–1549)
- Gerolamo Michiel, Count of Pula (1549)
- Matteo Mocenigo, Count of Pula (1551)
- Nicolò Venier, Count of Pula (1552)
- Nicolò Michiel, Count of Pula (1553–1554)
- Pietro Mocenigo, Count of Pula (1555)
- Gerolamo Zorzi, Count of Pula (1556)
- Giovanni Manolesso, Count of Pula (1558)
- Giovanni Dona', Count of Pula (1559)
- Luca de Mezzo, Count of Pula (1560–1561)
- Sebastian Trevisan, Count of Pula (1562)
- Francesco Capello, Count of Pula (1563–1564)
- Lorenzo Raimondo, Count of Pula (1565)
- Francesco Bembo, Count of Pula (1566)
- Benedetto Malipiero, Count of Pula (1567)
- Giustiniano Badoer, Count of Pula (1568)
- Paolo Zane, Count of Pula (1569)
- Alvise Zancaruol, Count of Pula (1569–1571)
- Troilo Malipiero, Count of Pula (1571)
- Cesare Michiel, Count of Pula (1572)
- Nicolò Duodo, Count of Pula (1573)
- Girolamo Malipiero, Count of Pula (1575)
- Nicolò Michiel, Count of Pula(1577)
- Albano Michiel, Count of Pula (1578)
- Giovan Battista Calbo, Count of Pula (1580)
- Marino Malipiero, provveditore (1581) and Count of Pula (1582–1583)
- Sante Tron, Count of Pula (1584)
- Orsato Memo, Count of Pula (1585)
- Filippo Diedo, Count of Pula (1588)
- Paolo Pisani, Count of Pula (1590)
- Domenico Diedo, Count of Pula (1591)
- Ferrigo Malatesta, Count of Pula (1592)
- Alessandro Pasqualigo, Count of Pula (1594)
- Giacomo Malipiero, Count of Pula (1595)
- Stefano Bollani, Count of Pula (1596)
- Andrea Bembo, Count of Pula (1597)
- Vettor Morosini, Count of Pula (1598)
- Francesco Duodo, Count of Pula (1599)

== 17th century ==
- Zaccaria Giustinian, Count of Pula (1600–1603)
- Pietro Donado, Count of Pula (1605–1606)
- Lorenzo Ghisi, Count of Pula (1606–1607)
- Giacomo Grimani, Count of Pula (1607)
- Lunardo Malipiero, Count of Pula (1612)
- Pietro Boldù, Count of Pula (1614)
- Antonio Longo, Count of Pula (1615)
- Girolamo Pollani, Count of Pula (1616)
- Vido Avogaro, Count of Pula (1616)
- Luca Pollani, Count of Pula (1618)
- Sebastian Querini, Count of Pula (1620)
- Francesco Bragadin, Count of Pula (1621)
- Cristoforo Duodo, Count of Pula (1623)
- Alvise Dolfin, Count of Pula (1624)
- Angelo da Mosto, Captain of Raspo (1625)
- Girolamo Pollani, Count of Pula (1625)
- Bartolomeo Magno, Count of Pula (1626)
- Vlatico Cossazza, Count of Pula(1628)
- Giovanni Pietro Barozzi, Count of Pula (1633)
- Luca Polani, Count of Pula (1634–1635)
- Angelo Donà, Count of Pula (1635)
- Filippo Salomon, Count of Pula (1636)
- Giovan Battista Marin, Count of Pula (1637)
- Paolo Minio, Count of Pula and provveditore (1638)
- Vincenzo Bragadin, Count of Pula and provveditore (1638)
- Francesco Querini, Count of Pula and provveditore (1640)
- Pietro Basadonna, Count of Pula and provveditore (1640–1641)
- Antonio Bragadin, Count of Pula and provveditore (1641–1642)
- Giovanni Contarini, Count of Pula and provveditore (1643)
- Gerolamo Zusto, Count of Pula and provveditore (1644–1646)
- Domenico Orio, Count of Pula and provveditore(1646–1647)
- Daniele Trevisan, Count of Pula and provveditore (1648–1649)
- Andrea Gritti, Count of Pula and provveditore (1649)
- Vincenzo Malipiero, Count of Pula and provveditore (1651)
- Lorenzo Malipiero, Count of Pula and provveditore (1652)
- Ottavian Zorzi, Count of Pula and provveditore (1653)
- Filippo Balbi, Count of Pula and provveditore (1654–1655)
- Nicolò Foscarini, Count of Pula and provveditore(1655–1656)
- Benedetto Contarini, Count of Pula and provveditore (1657)
- Almorò Barbaro, Count of Pula and provveditore (1658)
- Antonio da Mosto, Count of Pula and provveditore (1659)
- Baldissera Dolfin, Count of Pula and provveditore (1661)
- Nicolò Bragadin, Count of Pula and provveditore (1662)
- Angelo Bembo, Count of Pula and provveditore (1663–1664)
- Carlo Corner, Count of Pula and provveditore (1665)
- Giovanni Soranzo, Count of Pula and provveditore (1666–1667)
- Marchio' Coppo, Count of Pula and provveditore (1667)
- Giacomo Foscarini, Count of Pula and provveditore(1667–1668)
- Matteo Soranzo, Count of Pula and provveditore (1669)
- Lucio Balbi, Count of Pula and provveditore (1670)
- Marco Loredan, Count of Pula and provveditore (1672)
- Marin Riva, Count of Pula and provveditore (1673)
- Bernardo Gritti, Count of Pula and provveditore (1674)
- Camillo Zane, Count of Pula and provveditore (1676)
- Paolo Pasqualigo, Count of Pula and provveditore (1677–1678)
- Giovan Andrea Trevisan, Count of Pula and provveditore (1678–1679)
- Alessandro Priuli, Count of Pula and provveditore (1680–1681)
- Benetto Trevisan, Count of Pula and provveditore (1681–1682)
- Giacomo Morosini, Count of Pula and provveditore (1682–1683)
- Alessandro Priuli, Count of Pula and provveditore (1684–1685)
- Marco Balbi, Count of Pula and provveditore (1685–1686)
- Fernando Priuli, Count of Pula and provveditore (1686–1687)
- Angelo Corner, Count of Pula and provveditore (1688–1689)
- Gerolamo Marcello, Count of Pula and provveditore (1689–1690)
- Giacomo Vitturi, Count of Pula and provveditore (1690–1691)
- Pellegrin Baseggio, Count of Pula and provveditore (1692–1693)
- Lodovico Balbi, Count of Pula and provveditore (1693–1695)
- Stae Duodo, Count of Pula and provveditore (1695)
- Alessandro Dona', Count of Pula and provveditore (1695–1696)
- Francesco Trevisan, Count of Pula and provveditore (1696–1697)
- Giovanni Barbaro, Count of Pula and provveditore (1697)
- Gerolamo Barbaro, Count of Pula and provveditore (1697–1699)
- Marco Bragadin, Count of Pula and provveditore (1699)

== 18th century ==
- Marco Priuli, interim captain (1700)
- Tomaso Morosini, Count of Pula and provveditore (1700]–1701)
- Giulio Pasqualigo, Count of Pula and provveditore (1701–1702)
- Daniele Balbi, Count of Pula and provveditore (1703–1704)
- Giacomo Barbaro, Count of Pula and provveditore (1704–1705)
- Andrea Baseggio, Count of Pula and provveditore (1706–1707)
- Domenico Semitecolo, Count of Pula and provveditore (1708–1709)
- Pietro Loredan, Count of Pula and provveditore (1709–1710)
- Bernardo Balbi, Count of Pula and provveditore (1710–1711)
- Marin Badoer, Count of Pula and provveditore (1712–1713)
- Nicolò Giustinian, Count of Pula and provveditore (1713–1714)
- Domenico Trevisan, Count of Pula and provveditore (1714–1715)
- Marc'Antonio Semitecolo, Count of Pula and provveditore (1716–1717)
- Giustin Donà, Count of Pula and provveditore (1717–1718)
- Dandolo Giustino, Count of Pula and provveditore (1718)
- Nicolò Venier, Count of Pula and provveditore (1718–1719)
- Giovanni Vitturi, Count of Pula and provveditore (1720)
- Gio Batta Baseggio, Count of Pula and provveditore (1720–1722)
- Giacomo Pasqualigo, Count of Pula and provveditore (1722–1723)
- Angelo Donà, Count of Pula and provveditore (1724)
- Giovanni Baseggio, Count of Pula and provveditore (1725–1726)
- Giovanni Falier, Count of Pula and provveditore (1728)
- Andrea Trevisan, Count of Pula and provveditore (1729–1731)
- Michel Angelo Semenzi, Count of Pula and provveditore (1732)
- Iseppo Priuli, Count of Pula and provveditore (1732)
- Almorò Tiepolo, Count of Pula and provveditore (1732–1733)
- Benedetto Marcello, Count of Pula and provveditore (1733–1735)
- Girolamo Soranzo, Count of Pula and provveditore (1735–1737)
- Francesco Antonio Pasqualigo, Count of Pula and provveditore (1737–1738)
- Giovan Battista Malipiero, Count of Pula and provveditore (1738–1739)
- Pasqual Cicogna, Count of Pula and provveditore (1739–1741)
- Giovan Francesco Sagredo, Count of Pula and provveditore (1741–1742)
- Alvise Bragadin, Count of Pula and provveditore (1747–1749)
- Pietro Antonio Bembo, Count of Pula and provveditore (1749–1750)
- Giovan Francesco Moro, Count of Pula and provveditore (1750–1752)
- Domenico Soranzo, Count of Pula and provveditore (1752–1753)
- Francesco Donà, Count of Pula and provveditore (1753–1754)
- Antonio Cicogna, Count of Pula and provveditore (1754–1756)
- Bembo Valier, Count of Pula and provveditore (1756–1757)
- Antonio Longo, Count of Pula and provveditore (1757–1759)
- Lunardo Balbi, Count of Pula and provveditore (1760)
- Giovan Domenico Loredan, Count of Pula and provveditore (1760–1761)
- Simon Marin, Count of Pula and provveditore (1761–1763)
- Giovanni Querini, Count of Pula and provveditore (1763–1764)
- Girolamo Marcello, Count of Pula and provveditore (1764–1766)
- Gaetano Minotto, Count of Pula and provveditore (1766–1767)
- Mario Contarini, Count of Pula and provveditore (1767–1768)
- Giovanni Balbi, Count of Pula and provveditore (1768–1770)
- Girolamo Zorzi, Count of Pula and provveditore (1770–1771)
- Antonio Corner, Count of Pula and provveditore (1771–1773)
- Pietro Porta, Count of Pula and provveditore (1773–1774)
- Pietro Alessandro Manolesso, Count of Pula and provveditore (1775–1776)
- Pasquale Cicogna, Count of Pula and provveditore (1776–1778)
- Nicolò Pisani, Count of Pula and provveditore (1778–1779)
- Vincenzo Donà, Count of Pula and provveditore (1779–1780)
- Giovanni Cicogna, Count of Pula and provveditore (1781–1782)
- Francesco Bembo, Count of Pula and provveditore (1782–1783)
- Antonio Morosini, Count of Pula and provveditore (1784–1785)
- Alessandro Bon, Count of Pula and provveditore (1785–1786)
- Marchio' Balbi, Count of Pula and provveditore (1786–1787)
- Angelo Maria Orio, Count of Pula and provveditore (1788–1789)
- Antonio Barbaro, Count of Pula and provveditore (1789–1790)
- Almorò Gabriele Ranieri, Count of Pula and provveditore (1790–1791)
- Francesco Balbi, Count of Pula and provveditore (1792–1793)
- Andrea Dolfin, Count of Pula and provveditore (1793–1794)
- Zuan Alvise da Mosto, Count of Pula and provveditore (1794–1795)
- Antonio Cicogna, Count of Pula and provveditore (1796–1797)

Pula annexed by the Holy Roman Empire

- Antonio Cicogna, political director (1797–1805)

== 19th century ==
Pula annexed by the French Republic

- Giuseppe Lombardo, delegate (1807)
- Pietro Crescevani, podestà (1808)
- Domenico Bradamante, podestà (1809)
- Giuseppe Muazzo Cinei, Mayor of Pula (1811–1813)

Pula passes to the Austrian Empire

- Domenico Bradamante, first counselor and chief representative (1814)
- Tiziano Vareton, podestà (1814–1816)
- Andrea Razzo, podestà (1816–1822)
- Francesco Crescevani, podestà (1822–1830)
- Andrea Razzo, podestà (1831–1840)
- Guglielmo Lombardo, podestà (1840–1845)
- Giovanni Lombardo, podestà (1846–1861)
- Francesco Marinoni, podestà (1861–1864)
- Nicolò Rizzi, podestà (1864–1869)
- Angelo Demartini, podestà (1869–1876)
- Antonio Barsan, podestà (1876–1879)
- Vladimiro Czermak, commissioner (1879–1884)
- Giovanni Augusto Wassermann, podestà (1884–1887)
- Antonio Barsan, podestà (1887–1889)
- Lodovico Rizzi, podestà (1889–1904)

== 20th century ==
- Domenico Stanich, president of the board of directors (1904–1905)
- Domenico Stanich, podestà (1905–1906)
- Domenico Stanich, president of the administrative council (1906–1909)
- Giuseppe Bregato, president of the council (1909)
- Guglielmo Vareton, president of the council (1909–1910)
- Guglielmo Vareton, podestà (1910–1912)
- Rodolfo Gorizzutti, administrator of the municipality (1912–1916)
- Gualtiero Pfeifer, administrator of the municipality (1916–1917)
- Walter Pfeifer, administrator of the municipality (1917–1918)

Pula annexed by the Kingdom of Italy

- Domenico Stanich, municipal director (1918)
- Luigi Amelotti, county commissioner (1919–1922)
- Giuseppe Carvin, Mayor of Pula (1922–1923)
- Lodovico Rizzi, prefectural commissioner (1923–1926)
- G. Antonio Merizzi, prefectural commissioner (1926–1928)
- Luigi Bilucaglia, podestà (1928–1934)
- Giovanni D'Alessandro, prefectural commissioner (1934–1935)
- Luigi Draghicchio, podestà (1935–1942)
- Egidio Iaci, prefectural commissioner (1942–1943)
- Antonio De Berti, prefectural commissioner (1943)

Pula annexed to the OZAK

- Augusto De Manerini, prefectural commissioner (1944–1945)

Pula occupied by the Yugoslav People's Army

- Francesco Neffat, President of the Narodno-Oslobodilačkih Odbor (1945)

Pula occupied by the Allies

- Giorgio Dagri, governor of the county (1945–1947)

Pula passes to Yugoslavia

- Francesco Neffat, President of the Narodnog odbora of Pula (1947–1954)
- Mirko Perković, President of the Narodnog odbora of Pula (1954–1958)
- Anton Bubić, President of the Narodnog odbora of Pula (1958–1962)
- Ivan Brljafa, President of the Narodnog odbora of Pula (1963)
- Anton Vidulić, President of the Narodnog odbora of Pula (1963–1965)
- Anton Pavlinić, President of the Narodnog odbora of Pula (1965–1969)
- Josip Lazarić, President of the Narodnog odbora of Pula (1969–1974)
- Josip Kolić, President of the Narodnog odbora of Pula (1974–1982)
- Stanko Kuftić, President of the Narodnog odbora of Pula (1982–1983)
- Šime Vidulin, President of the Narodnog odbora of Pula (1983–1984)
- Anton Šuran, President of the Narodnog odbora of Pula (1984–1985)
- Vinko Jurcan, President of the Narodnog odbora of Pula (1985–1986)
- Ivica Percan, President of the Narodnog odbora of Pula (1986–1990)

Pula passes to Croatia

- Luciano Delbianco, Mayor of Pula (1990–1993)
- Igor Štoković, Mayor of Pula (1993–1996)
- Giancarlo Župić, Mayor of Pula (1997–2001)

== 21st century ==
- Luciano Delbianco, Mayor of Pula (2001–2005)
- Valter Drandić, Mayor of Pula (2005–2006)
- Boris Miletić, Mayor of Pula (2006–)
