= List of mayors of Pula =

Mayor of the City of Pula
- Gradonačelnik Pule
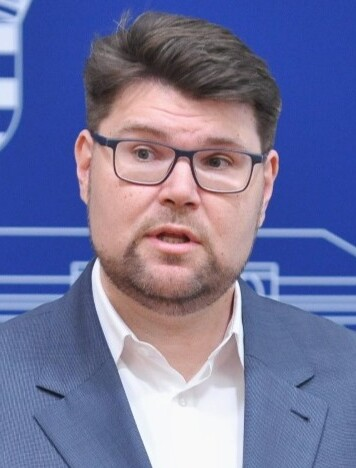
- Incumbent; Peđa Grbin since 5 June 2025
- Appointer: Direct elections
- Term length: 4 years unlimited number of renewals
- Inaugural holder: Luciano Delbianco
- Formation: 1991
- Website: pula.hr

This article contains a list of people who have served as mayor of Pula, the largest city in Istria County, and the sixth largest city in Croatia, since the establishment of the Republic of Croatia. For a complete list of all chief magistrates of Pula, see Chief Executive of Pula.

No.	Picture	Name	Term of office		Elected	Political party
1		Luciano Delbianco	1990	1993		Istrian Democratic Assembly
2		Igor Štoković	1993	1996	1993	Istrian Democratic Assembly
3		Giancarlo Župić	1997	2001	1997	Istrian Democratic Assembly
4		Luciano Delbianco	2001	2005	2001	Istrian Democratic Assembly
5		Valter Drandić	2005	2006	2005	Istrian Democratic Assembly
6		Boris Miletić	2006	4 June 2021	2009 2013 2017	Istrian Democratic Assembly
7		Filip Zoričić	4 June 2021	5 June 2025	2021	Independent
8		Peđa Grbin	5 June 2025	Incumbent	2025	Social Democratic party of Croatia

== See also ==
- Chief Executive of Pula
- List of mayors in Croatia

== Sources ==
- "Upravljali su Pulom od 1186. godine" Grad Pula (in Croatian)
- "Svi pulski gradonačelnici od 1947 do danas" Glas Istre (in Croatian)
