= Igor Štoković =

Croatian economist, musician and politician

Mayor of Pula
- In office 1993–1996

Personal details
- Born: December 16, 1959 Pula, SR Croatia, SFR Yugoslavia
- Died: April 9, 2015 (aged 55) Pula, Croatia
- Party: Istrian Democratic Assembly
- Education: University of Rijeka

Igor Štoković (December 16, 1959 – April 9, 2015) was a Croatian economist, musician and politician.

Štoković was born in Pula, on December 16, 1959. He graduated from the Faculty of Economics at the University of Rijeka, and obtained his doctorate in 1990 at the same faculty.

During the Croatian War of Independence, he contributed to the maintenance of peace and order in Pula when the latter was occupied by the JNA, preventing the destruction of the city, which the JNA threatened on a daily basis. He was, with Radovan Juričić, part of the team led by Luciano Delbianco that conducted the uneasy negotiations with the JNA commanders, which led to the relatively peaceful retreat of the Yugoslav Army from Pula on December 16, 1991.

He was Mayor of Pula from 1993 to 1996.

Štoković had been president of the supervisory board of Arenaturist since its inception, and in 1998 became its chairman. A year later, he was appointed CEO of Arenaturist, a position he held until his death.

Together with Luciano Delbianco and Denis Mikolić, he formed the trio Kravate, a popular folk band from istria in which he was a vocalist and played the keyboards.

He was a professor of economics at the Faculty of Economics and Tourism »Dr. Mijo Mirković « in Pula, where he taught microeconomics.

He died on April 9, 2015, in Pula.

Preceded by Luciano Delbianco	Mayor of Pula; 1993–1996	Succeeded by Giancarlo Župić
