= Francesco Neffat =

Croatian politician

Mayor of Pula
- In office 1947–1949

Personal details
- Born: Francesco Neffat; 24 June 1908; Pula, Austria-Hungary
- Died: 25 January 1990 (aged 83); Pula, Yugoslavia
- Political party: League of Communists of Yugoslavia

Francesco Neffat (Franjo Nefat), was an antifascist, politician and blacksmith from Pula, Croatia who contributed to the liberation of Pula during World War 2, and to the annexation of Istria to Croatia. He was the first president of the People's Committee of Pula (Chief Executive of Pula) from 1947 to 1954.

== Biography ==
In 1924 Neffat entered the Italian Communist Youth Federation, the youth organization of the Communist Party of Italy, and in 1926 he entered the Communist Party of Italy. Later that year, on May 1, he distributed leaflets and waved the red flag in the civic high school, now the Humanities Department of the University of Pula.

After spending two years in the Italian navy in La Spezia (1928–1930), he returned to Pula. He then refused to enroll in a fascist union, and thereafter had to change jobs frequently, even though he was a respected blacksmith.

From 1936 to 1938 he worked for the organization of a party in a cement factory in Pula, but was arrested when the police discovered the organization and the members of the KPI, who on May 28, 1938, distributed printed leaflets against solidarity with fascist Spain. Nefat was sentenced to 4 years in prison.

By profession a laborer, he entered the Yugoslav resistance after the fall of fascism in 1943. On September 13, 1943, he was among the signatories of the Pazin Declaration, drawn up by Monsignor Božo Milanović, which asked for the annexation of Istria to Yugoslavia and was submitted to the Paris Peace Conference.

On May 5, 1945, the battle for Pula ended with the fall of Muzil, accelerated by two Pula citizens, the communist Romano Kumar and socialist Steno Califfi, who managed to find the pipes that supplied Muzil with water. Neffat entered the city together with the Yugoslav army and on May 5 he was appointed president of the CLN of Pula, holding the municipality for the first period of Yugoslav administration. Neffat later croatized his name to Franjo Nefat.

He maintained the administration for a month and a half, until June 20, when it came under Anglo-American control. On February 10, 1947, with the definitive transfer of Pula to Yugoslavia, he returned as the city's administrator and as President of the national council, a position he held until 1954.

In 2012, the city of Pula dedicated a street to him.
