= Julian of Bale =

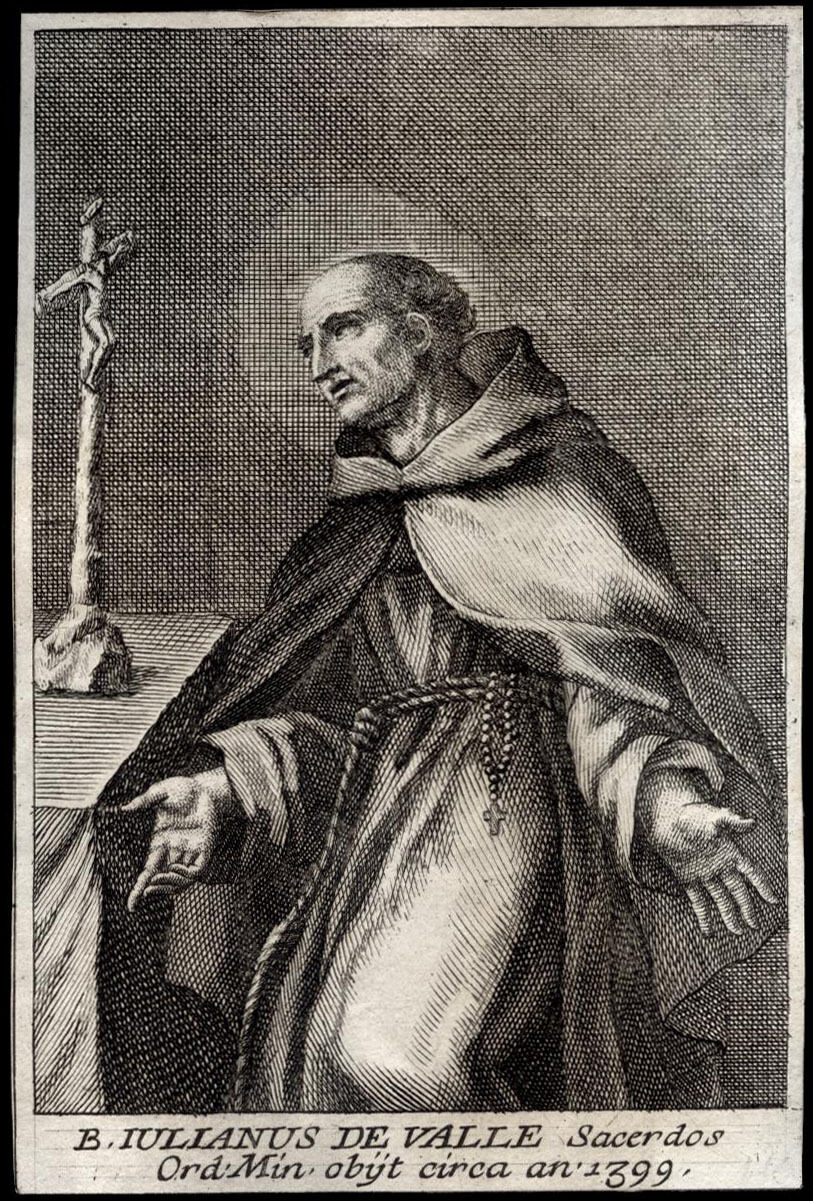
Julian of Bale, 1700 engraving

Julian of Bale (early 14th century – c. 1350), was a Franciscan friar, who was beatified by the Catholic Church in 1910.

The decree with which the church beatified him on February 23, 1910 provides only scant information about Julian. He was born in an unknown year, in Bale, Istria, possibly to a respectable local family; perhaps the local Cesarel (Cusaril or Cesarello). He lived in the local monastery of St. Mihovil, that was left by the Camaldolese in the 14th century, and thereafter occupied by the Franciscans. He distinguished himself as a virtuous and holy man. He visited the Istrian villages, bringing peace and setting quarrels. However, many people seeking advice also visited him in the Mihovil abbey.

The locals began to venerate him immediately after his death, and chose him as their patron. Statutes of the town of Bale from the 15th century confirm him as the city patron.

In the decree with which the Holy See confirmed his beatification it is stated that he was "virtuous in word and deed, and inflamed with divine love." In the decree is emphasized the zeal wherewith he visited the Istrian villages and towns, bringing peace among the quarrelsome.
