= Valter Drandić =

Croatian economist and politician

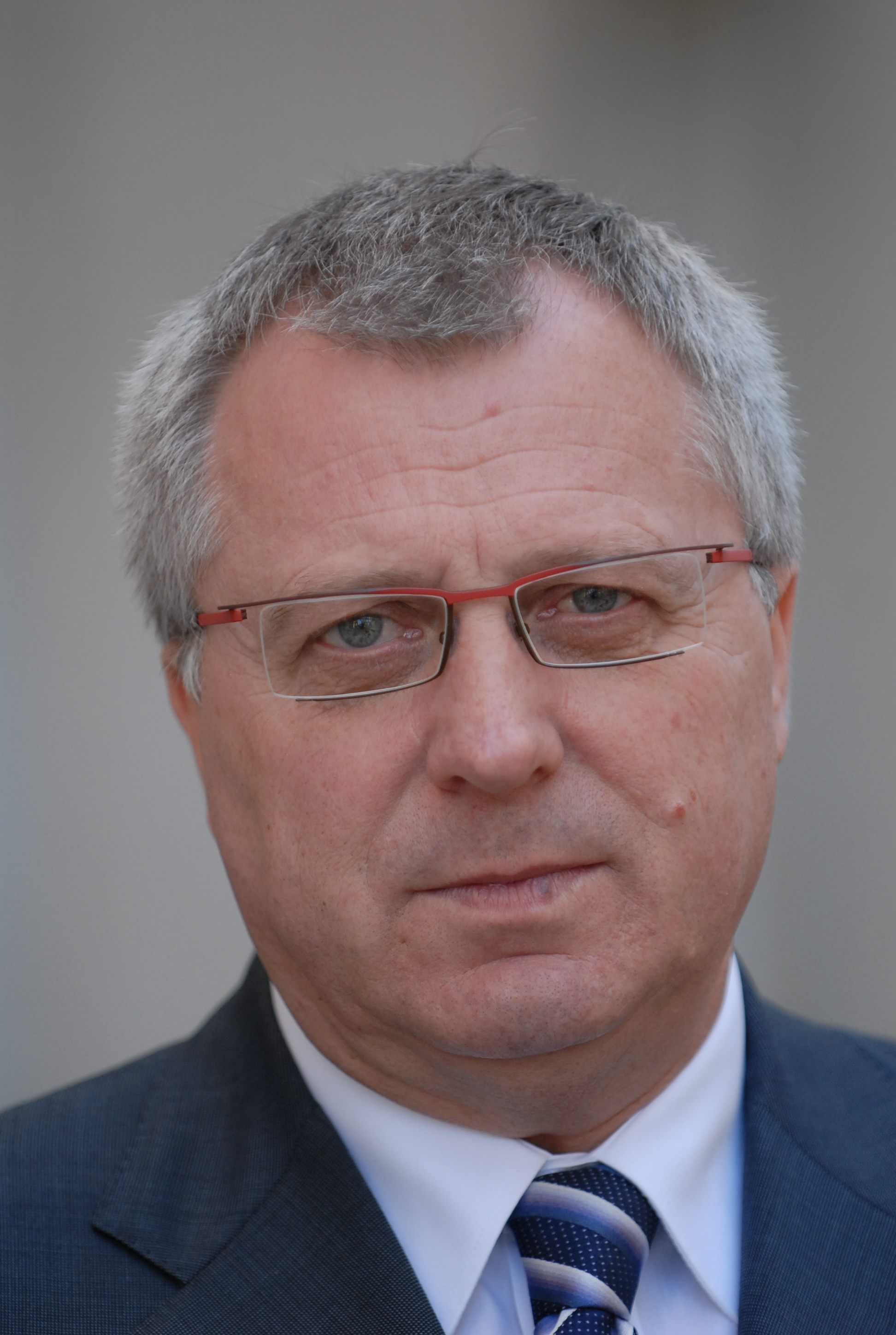
- Valter Drandić

Mayor of Pula
- In office 2005–2006

Member of the Croatian Parliament
- In office 2 February 2000 – 22 December 2003
- In office 22 December 2003 – 11 January 2008

Personal details
- Born: 7 August 1956 (age 70) Pula, SR Croatia, SFR Yugoslavia
- Party: Istrian Democratic Assembly
- Education: University of Rijeka
- Awards: Officer of the Order of the Star of Italy

Valter Drandić (born August 7, 1956) is a Croatian economist and politician, member of the Regional Assembly of Istria and a member of the European Committee of the Regions.

Graduated from technical school and studied economics and tourism at the University of Rijeka. Passed the professional exams for expert in informatics at the Republic Committee for Science, Technology and Informatics in Zagreb.

Highlights from professional career: Project manager at the Institute of Informatics, CEO of a Printing Company, Board member of a Speciality Hospital, manager of several development projects (Istrian Development Agency, Pula General Hospital, ...).

By decisions of the Croatian Government and the Council of the European Union, he was appointed a member of the European Committee of the Regions for the terms of office 2020-2025 and 2025-2030.

He was elected a member of the Istrian Regional Assembly seven times and in 2013 and 2017 he was elected President of the Assembly. From 1996 to 2000 he served as vice president of the Region of Istria.

In 1997 was elected a member of the County House of the Croatian National Parliament.

From 2000 to 2008 was elected to the Croatian Parliament for two terms, where he served as President of the Tourism Committee and President of the Executive Board of the National Group of the Croatian Parliament at the Inter-Parliamentary Union. He was also a member of the National Committee for Monitoring the Process of Croatia's accession to the European Union, the Croatian Parliament Delegation to the Croatian-EU Joint Parliamentary Committee, the Committee for European Integration and the Committee for Interparliamentary Cooperation and the President of the Croatian-Italian Friendship Group.

Mayor of the City of Pula-Pola from June 2005 to June 2006.

Member of the party Istarski demokratski sabor - Istrian Democratic Assembly (IDS-DDI), where he served as member of the Presidency, Vice President, Secretary General, President of the Council and President of the City Branch of Pula-Pola.

Volunteer firefighter, Honorary president of the Istrian Firefighters association, where served as President since 1997 to 2026.

He is holder of the decoration of the President of the Republic of Croatia Order of the Croatian Interlace and the Homeland War Memorial Medal, of the President of the Italian Republic "Ufficiale dell'Ordine della Stella d'Italia" (Officer of the Order of the Star of Italy), of the Firefighters Decoration for Special Merits and Lifetime Achievement Award from the Croatian Firefighters Association.

Drandić and his party showed friendliness towards the Italians of Istria, where today many municipalities are bilingual, and the Italian language is considered to be a co-official language.

| Preceded by Luciano Delbianco | Mayor of Pula; 2005–2006 | Succeeded by Boris Miletić |
