= Ernest Jelušić =

Croatian priest, revivalist and politician

Ernest Jelušić (October 24, 1863 – March 13, 1910) was a Croatian priest and politician who was known for his involvement in the Croatian national revival.

Born in Kastav, he was educated in Kastav, Rijeka and Koper, where he completed teacher'school. He worked in Lipa and Pazin. In Lipa, he was the lead teacher in the newly opened elementary school. He organized a reading room, a choir and a tamburitza orchestra in Pazin. He chaired the Pazin based Croatian-Slovenian Teachers' Association Narodni prosvjet and was the editor of the association's newspaper. He occasionally wrote songs dedicated to Istria and particular individuals. He published them in the Croatian revival media used by the Narodni prosvjet, Naša sloga, the only Croatian newspaper for Istrian Croatians and Slovenes at the time. After retirement, he was a superintendent in Pula at the Community School. Further, he was the principal of a school near Pula, in Šijana. He served therein from 1901 until his death in 1910.

He participated in the first Croatian Istrian camp in Rubeši. He was an active member of the Kastav Reading Room and the Brotherhood of Croatian People in Istria. He died in Zagreb.
