= Pula Communal Palace =

City hall of Pula, Croatia

Communal Palace
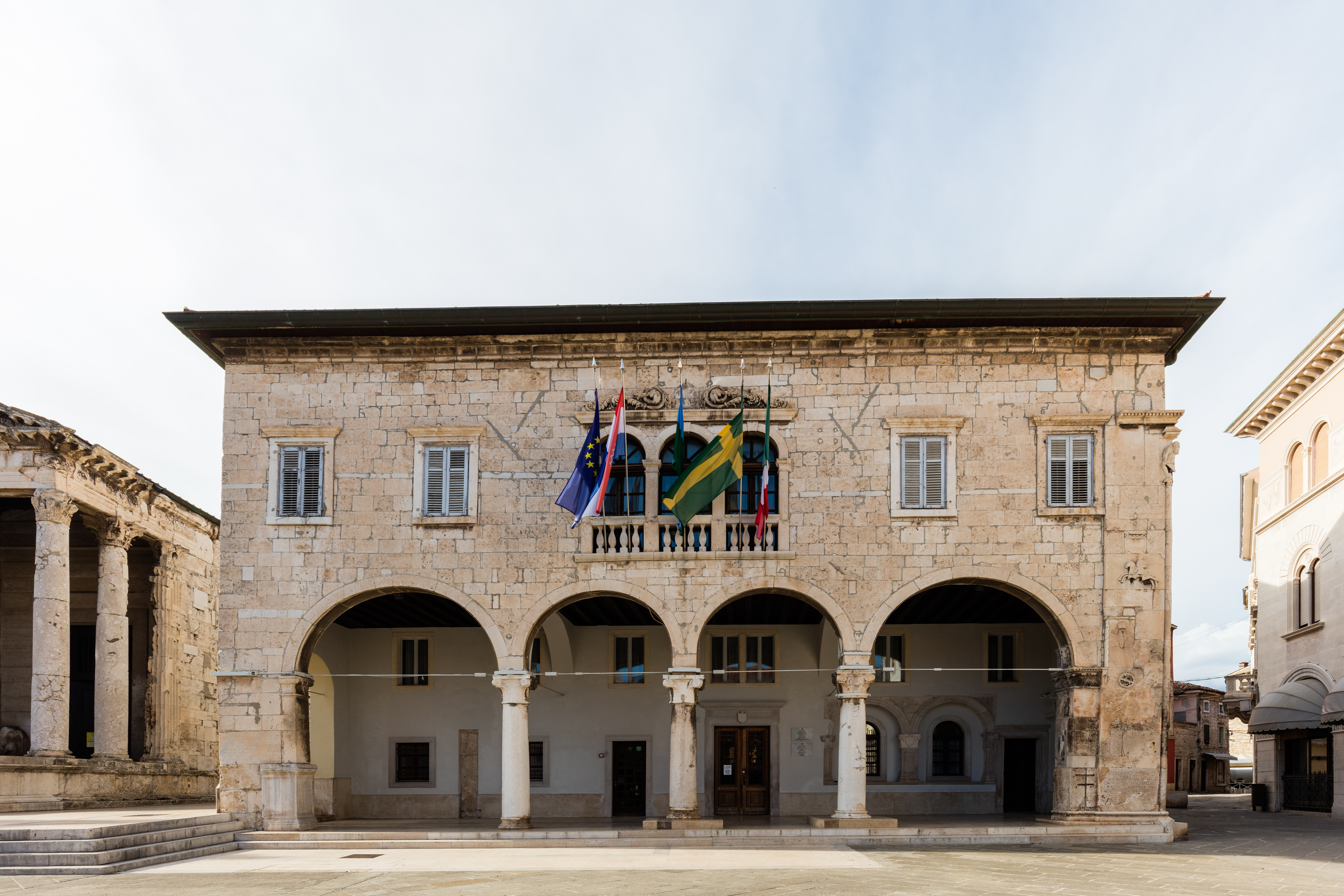
- The entrance to the Palace
- Interactive map of the Communal Palace area

General information
- Type: City hall
- Architectural style: different styles
- Location: Forum Square, Pula, Istria, Croatia
- Coordinates: 44°52′N 13°51′E
- Construction started: 13th century
- Completed: 1296

The local government of the City of Pula is seated in the Communal Palace (Croatian: Komunalna palača u Puli; Italian: Palazzo Comunale), located on the Forum Square, in the center of the city.

== History ==
The Communal Palace is situated at the northern end of the main square of the old part of the City of Pula, called the Forum Square. The spot occupied by the Palace has been used for the public buildings since Ancient Rome, when the place was used as a part of a triad of Roman temples, of which today only the Temple of Augustus remains. The eastern of these temples, called the Temple of Diana, was used as a rudimentary city hall from the 9th century.

As the city prospered, there was a need to construct a dedicated place which would serve as a city hall, so the construction of the new city hall at the site of the Temple of Diana began near the end of the 13th century, and the new city hall was finished in 1296.

The building was constructed in Gothic style using the material of the old Roman temples and other building on the site, retaining their walls when possible. Even today, the whole northern part of the Temple of Diana is clearly visible at the back side of the Communal Palace.

Since the construction, the Communal Palace has seen numerous reconstructions. At the end of the 15th century the building was reconstructed in Renaissance style and during the 17th century, the building was again reconstructed, now in Baroque style.

The present state of building is due to several reconstructions made during the 19th and 20th centuries, the last of which was finished in 1988.
