= Radovan Juričić =

Croatian politician (1951–2012)

Head of State Administration Office of Istria County
- In office 2004–2009
- President: Stjepan Mesić
- Prime Minister: Ivica Račan

Personal details
- Born: January 30, 1951 Pazin, SR Croatia, SFR Yugoslavia
- Died: February 14, 2012 (aged 61) Pula, Croatia
- Party: Istrian Democratic Assembly
- Education: University of Zagreb

Radovan Juričić (January 30, 1951 – February 14, 2012) was a Croatian politician.

== Early life ==
Juričić was born on January 30, 1951, in Pazin. After graduating from high school, he went to the Faculty of Law in Zagreb, which he successfully completed on time. In his high school days, he was a successful athlete, sailor and basketball player, and during his studies he was an active youth leader. Istrian students in Zagreb elected him president of the Istrian Students' Club Mate Balota, and after returning to his hometown, Radovan continued to work in youth organizations.

Shortly after completing his studies, he served as president of the youth organization of the Municipality of Pula, and after that as president of the youth community of the Municipality of Rijeka. Shortly thereafter, Juričić became the President of the Committee for Social Activities of the Municipality of Pula. After a career as an athlete, he rose to the position of president of the basketball club Istragrađevno - Puljanka.

== Croatian War of Independence ==
During the Croatian War of Independence, he found himself in the position of Secretary of the Municipal Assembly of Pula and Secretary of the soon established Crisis Staff of the municipality. He helped preserving peace and when it was necessary to prevent the possible destruction of the city, which was threatened by the JNA on a daily basis. Even during the war period, Juričić always found time to receive in his office anyone who needed help.

He was part of the team led by Luciano Delbianco that successfully negotiated the removal of the JNA from Pula, which, after two months of tensions, night shootings and blackouts, was achieved on December 16, 1991.

For his "selfless dedication during the war days", together with other members of the Crisis Staff, he earned the City of Pula Award in 1992, and as Chief of Staff of the Civil Protection the Knight's Charter (for volunteerism, selflessness, determination and courage). In addition, as a member of the Crisis Staff, he was awarded the Homeland War Memorial in 2004 in Zagreb.

== Post-war period ==
In the post-war years, Juričić served as the head of the Office of the President of the Municipal Assembly, and after the first elections for prefect, he was also elected head of the Prefect's Office. He welcomed the end of the 1990s as Assistant Head of the Istria County Economy Service, and in the following period was appointed Head of the State Administration Office in the Istria County. He held this position for a full seven years, and in May 2011 he received his retirement.
