= Boris Miletić =

Croatian economist and politician

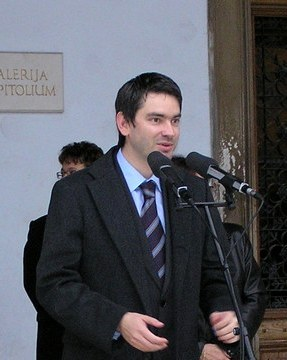
- Miletić in 2006

Prefect of the Istria County
- Incumbent
- Assumed office 11 June 2021
- Preceded by: Fabrizio Radin

Mayor of Pula
- In office June 2006 – 4 June 2021
- Preceded by: Valter Drandić
- Succeeded by: Filip Zoričić

Member of the Croatian Parliament for 8th electoral district
- In office 28 December 2015 – 7 December 2018
- Succeeded by: Emil Daus
- In office 11 January 2008 – 22 December 2011

President of the Istrian Democratic Assembly
- In office 1 January 2014 – 8 June 2021
- Preceded by: Ivan Jakovčić
- Succeeded by: Dalibor Paus

Personal details
- Born: 2 September 1975 (age 51) Pula, SR Croatia, SFR Yugoslavia
- Party: Independent (2022–present)
- Other political affiliations: Istrian Democratic Assembly (1996–2022)
- Spouse: Lara Miletić
- Children: 1
- Education: Juraj Dobrila University of Pula

Boris Miletić (pronounced [ˌbôːris ˈmîletit͡ɕ]; born 2 September 1975) is a Croatian economist and politician who has been prefect of Istria County since 2021 and president of the Istrian Democratic Assembly (IDS) from 2014 to 2021.

Miletić completed his undergraduate studies at the Pula Faculty of Economics and Tourism "Dr. Mijo Mirković" in 1999, and returned to earn a master's degree in 2002. He also pursued further education at Cleveland State University as well as at the Faculties of Economics in Split and Zagreb.

From 2000 to 2006, Miletić served in various civil service positions in Istria County, including an internship with the Department for the Economy (2000–2001) and with the Istrian Development Agency (2001–2006), where he eventually became CEO.

Miletić became the mayor of Pula in June 2006, and was re-elected in 2009, 2013 and 2017. He served in the Croatian Parliament from 2008 to 2011 as a member of the IDS.

In 2014, after the expulsion of Damir Kajin from the IDS, Miletić became the party's leader. In the 2015 parliamentary election, Miletić and party leaders decided to leave the Kukuriku coalition (afterwards known as the Croatia is Growing coalition) and have the party contest the election on its own. The party went on to win three seats.

After the local elections in 2021, Miletić resigned as party president after the heavy defeat of the IDS in municipal elections in Pula.

In 2022, the IDS presidency initiated disciplinary proceedings against Miletić, after which he left the party.

Preceded by Valter Drandić	Mayor of Pula; 2006–2021	Succeeded by Filip Zoričić

Preceded by Fabrizio Radin	Prefect of Istria County; 2021–present	Succeeded by Incumbent
