= Luciano Delbianco =

Croatian politician and economist

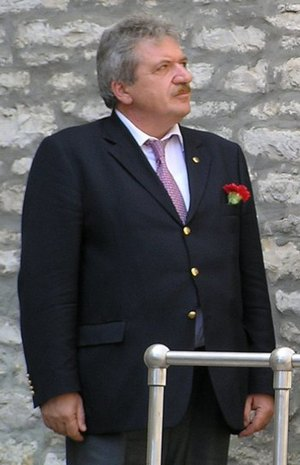

President of the Municipal Assembly of Pula
- In office 1990–1993
- Preceded by: Ivica Percan
- Succeeded by: Office abolished

Mayor of Pula
- In office 1993–1993
- Preceded by: Office created
- Succeeded by: Igor Štoković
- In office 2001–2005
- Preceded by: Giancarlo Župić
- Succeeded by: Valter Drandić

Member of the Croatian Parliament
- In office 1997–2000

Prefect of the Istria County
- In office 1993–1997
- Preceded by: Office created
- Succeeded by: Stevo Zufic

President of the Istrian Democratic Forum
- In office 14 December 1996 – 2005
- Preceded by: Office established
- Succeeded by: Frane Milat

Personal details
- Born: 10 June 1954 Pula, SR Croatia, FPR Yugoslavia
- Died: 29 September 2014 (aged 60) Zagreb, Croatia
- Party: League of Communists of Yugoslavia (1988-1990); Social Democratic Party of Croatia (1990–1993); Istrian Democratic Assembly (1993–1996); Istrian Democratic Forum (1996–2005)
- Spouse: Valnea Delbianco
- Children: 2
- Education: University of Zagreb

Luciano Delbianco (10 June 1954 – 29 September 2014) was a Croatian electrical engineer, musician and politician who served two nonconsecutive terms as Mayor of Pula.

== Biography ==
Luciano Delbianco was born on 10 June 1954, in Pula. He completed his primary education in 1969, and his secondary education at the Technical School in Pula in 1973. In the same year, he enrolled at the Faculty of Electrical Engineering, University of Zagreb. He obtained the academic title of electrical engineer in 1977, and two years later started his postgraduate studies at the same faculty. After completing his studies in 1983, he received the academic degree of Master of Technical Sciences in the scientific field of electrical engineering. He worked at the Uljanik dockyard from 1977 to 1979 and then at the technical department of Elektroistra in Pula (Association of Electric Power Organizations of Croatia), where he worked as an engineer for the development of distribution networks and as a technical manager.

He entered politics in 1988 as vice-president of the Pula Municipal Assembly. After the first multi-party elections in 1990, he became the president of the Pula Municipal Assembly on the SDP list.

In the early 1990s, due to the growing pressure of the recently erupted Croatian War of Independence, as the first man of the city and coordinator of the presidents of the municipal assemblies of Istria, he was one of the chief negotiators of the Pula city administration with the JNA together with Igor Štoković and Radovan Juričić. Since Pula was then one of the strongest JNA barracks on the Adriatic with 12,000 soldiers of all branches (KoV, JRZ and JRM) and a large number of military equipment, Delbianco negotiated with the commanders of the 5th Naval Sector, Admirals Pogačnik, Barović and Rakić, on the peaceful departure of the JNA from the city. Despite occasional incidents, attempts to provoke an armed conflict and attacks on the Municipal Crisis Staff based at the Communal Palace, he managed to have the JNA leave the city peacefully on 15 December 1991. In the negotiations, Delbianco achieved the takeover from the JNA of 78 military facilities on 154 hectares of land and all the weapons of the Territorial Defense. After the peaceful departure of the JNA from Pula, an assassination attempt was made on Delbianco.

He served as President of the Municipal Assembly of Pula until 1993, when he became the first Mayor of Pula due to legal changes in the administrative structure of the state. On the eve of the 1993 local elections, he joined the IDS with a group of SDP members. He won the election with almost 73 percent of the vote and thus became the first Istrian prefect. In the 1995 parliamentary elections, he was elected a member of the House of Representatives of the Croatian Parliament, but he continued to serve as prefect. In January 1996, there was a dismissal of three directors of the city's public companies in Pula (the "Pula case") and due to pressure in this regard, he announced in October 1996 that he would leave the IDS and join a new party. He founded a new party, the Istrian Democratic Forum, on 14 December 1996, at the helm of which he remained until 2005. In January 1997, at the Pazin County Assembly, IDS members voted no confidence in the prefect, so Delbianco did not reach the end of his term. He was replaced by Stevo Zufic. In 1997 he was elected a member of the House of Representatives of the Croatian National Parliament, where he remained until the end of his term in 2000.

At the end of 1998, he received his PhD from the Faculty of Electrical Engineering in Zagreb with the topic Contribution to the research of the influence of resistant grounding of star points on overvoltage heights and protective earthing system in distribution networks (Doprinos istraživanju utjecaja otpornog uzemljenja zvjezdišta na visine prenapona i na sistem zaštitnog uzemljenja u razdjelnim mrežama), obtaining the degree of Doctor of Technical Sciences.

After the local elections in 2001, he established the government in Pula in a coalition with the Social Democratic Party and the Independent List of Loredana Stock and became mayor of Pula for the second time. At the end of his term in 2005, he left politics and devoted himself entirely to scientific and teaching work.

He later became assistant professor at the Department of Electrical Engineering, Faculty of Engineering, University of Rijeka; assistant professor at the Polytechnic of Pula, and vice-dean in the latter institution.

Delbionco famously played the accordion and sang in the Pula trio Kravate. Their performance at the Pula Arena is especially remembered, when, on occasion of the 3000th anniversary of the city, they played and sang the Istrian hit "Only angels know" (Samo anđeli znaju).

He died on 29 September 2014, in a hospital in Zagreb, after a serious illness, at the age of 61.

Political offices
Preceded by Office created	Mayor of Pula; 1993	Succeeded by Igor Štoković
Preceded by Giancarlo Župić	Mayor of Pula; 2001–2005	Succeeded by Valter Drandić
