= Dragi Kamen =

Collection of poems by Mijo Mirković

- 1971 edition cover
- Author: Mijo Mirković (Mate Balota)
- Language: Čakavian
- Genre: Poetry
- Publication date: 1938
- Publication place: Yugoslavia
- Pages: 83
- OCLC: 637876642

Dragi Kamen ("Dear Rock," or "Precious stone") is a collection of poems by Croatian author Mijo Mirković, better known by his pen name Mate Balota. Mirković published this book under that pen name.

Mirković was an economist, who published several academic books on economy. He was a professor at the Faculty of Economics in Zagreb until his death, although at the time when he published this work he was employed at the Subotica Law School. Beside his work on economy, Mirković also wrote poetry, as well as one novel (Tijesna zemlja). Published for the first time in 1938 in Zagreb, the book owes its name to the 1931 poem.

The poems that compose this collection have been said to "bring to life events and feelings of the lives of [the Istrian people], their happy and (mostly) sad and tragic moments, their struggle for survival." The older reader relates to the poem because they describe life as it used be or their parents told them it was, with its happy notes and all the hardships and tragic moments. The poems, "with a native theme and a strong social tone and a nostalgic experience of Istria" became a cult book among Istrian Croats, with the book dubbed "the most Istrian of all books" at the time it was first published.

The poem My Mother (Moja mati) was included in the anthology Poeti croati moderni (Garzanti, 1942), edited by Luigi Salvini.

The conference honouring Balota Susreti na dragom kamenu (literally, "Encounters on a Precious Stone"), owes its name to this book.

The first edition had a problem in that the poems were not accentuated, although they sound natural if read in the Rakalj dialect, according to its accentual rules. Following editions were accentuated.
