= Susreti na dragom kamenu =

Scientific conference dedicated to Mijo Mirković

Susreti na dragom kamenu (lit. 'Encounters on a Precious Stone') is a Croatian scientific conference founded in 1968 in commemoration of Mijo Mirković or Mate Balota. Mirković's works are studied and discussed at these meetings.

== The conference ==
The meeting was held for the first time in 1968. It was held in the fall of every year (with the exception of years 1974–77).

In 1990 it started to be held every other year, and it was decided that the location would be changed for every meeting, which has been held in Pula, Labin, Umag, Motovun, Buzet, Rovinj, Brijuni, Rakalj, Mali Lošinj.

The organizers of the meeting were the faculties of economics of Zagreb and Rijeka, the Higher School of Economics of Pula, the Matica hrvatska branch from Pula and the Cultural and Educational Association of Pula.

The gatherings were once focused on the "versatility of Mirković as a writer" and the topics development of Istria, Matija Vlačić-Franković (Flacius), industry and tourism, etc. The focus then shifted on the problems dealt with and observed by Mirković in Istria, Croatia and then-Yugoslavia, treating such themes as "agriculture, domestic and foreign trade, maritime economy, small businesses, industrialization and environmental protection, tourism."

Part of the conference was always dedicated to Mirković as an author, but in 1988 (20th anniversary) the whole conference was "thematically dedicated to Mirković's book work." After 1990 the topics were updated to present-day problems and themes, such as restructuring and globalization, the problems issuing from the transition period, the European Union, etc.

The committee is presided by professors and academicians, and a paper of the proceedings of the meeting Zborniku radova znanstvenoga skupa Susreti na dragom kamenu ("Proceedings of the scientific conference Encounters on a Precious Stone") is released out of the meeting.

The meeting is named after Mirković's 1931 novel of the same name (Dragi kamen), and the known collection of poems of the same name, published for the first time in 1938 in Zagreb and then republished in several editions.

In 2018 the meeting celebrated its 50th anniversary.
