= International Poetry Festival "Days of Naim" =

The International Poetry Festival "Days of Naim" (Albanian: Festivali Ndërkombëtar i Poezisë "Ditët e Naimit") is a cultural event held in Tetovo, North Macedonia, gathering poets, writers, and artists from various parts of the world. This festival, held annually, is named in honor of Naim Frashëri, one of the greatest figures of Albanian literature and the Albanian National Renaissance.

"Days of Naim" began in 1996 and has since continued to grow and evolve, gaining international recognition. The festival is organized by the Association of Albanian Artists and Writers "Days of Naim" and is supported by various cultural and governmental institutions, as well as private sponsors.

== Laureates ==
- Abdellatif Laabi
- Basri Çapriqi
- Dražen Katunarić
- Ewa Lipska
- Fiona Sampson
- Kama Sywor Kamanda
- Krystyna Lenkowska
- Lidija Dimkovska
- Ndue Ukaj
- Nicole Cage-Florentiny
- Tua Forsström
