= Jakša Fiamengo =

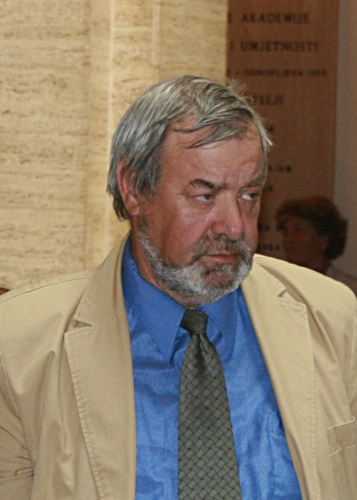
- Fiamengo in June 2008
- Born: 26 November 1946; Komiža, FPR Yugoslavia
- Died: 27 December 2018 (aged 72); Split, Croatia
- Occupations: Poet; translator; theatre critic

Jakša Fiamengo (26 November 1946 – 27 December 2018), was a prominent Croatian poet of Čakavian dialect, translator, theatre critic and member of Croatian Academy of Sciences and Arts. As an author and lyricist of many Dalmatian evergreens, sung by klapa and famous Oliver Dragojević and aesthetic Čakavian poet he is considered among greatest Croatian Čakavian and Mediterranean-oriented literati, together with Drago Gervais, Mate Balota and Vladimir Nazor.

Born in Komiža at the island of Vis, he graduated at Classical Gymnasium in Split, where he also edited poet magazine Vidik (Seesight). His main lyrical preoccupation is Adriatic Sea, together with its islands, harbours, straits and laridaes, as well as picturesque Dalmatian towns in which he describes simplicity and poverty (mižerija) of its inhabitants, from fishermen and workmen (težaci) to young lovers and old people, tradition-guardians.

Fiamengo published sixteen collections of poems, among which some of the gathered evergreen status being performed by Oliver Dragojević (for whom he wrote 60 songs), Meri Cetinić and other noted Dalmatian-music singers (esp. klapas): Piva klapa ispo' volta ("Klapa sings under the bridge"), Nadalina, Karoca gre, Nocturno, U prolazu ("Passingly"), Promenade ("The Walkways"). He promoted and conducted development of plenty amateur theatrical ensembles. Furthermore, his theatre critics weren't unnoticed. Fiamengo translated from Macedonian, mostly poetry of Konstantin Miladinov.

He died in Split in December 2018 at the age of 73. His death strongly echoed in Croatian public: Croatian Radiotelevision, The Town of Split and HAZU organised ceremonies honoring his memory.

Jakša Fiamengo received a Tin Ujević Award, poeta oliveatus of Croatia rediviva (1993) and Porin for lyrics.
