= Percan =

Percan is a surname. Notable people with the surname include:

- Diego Percan (born 2001), Spanish footballer
- Lidija Percan (born 1938), Istrian Croatian singer
- Renato Percan (1936–2013), Istrian Croatian painter
