= Tin Ujević Award =

The Tin Ujević Award (Croatian: Nagrada "Tin Ujević") is an award given for contributions to Croatian poetry. It is considered the most prestigious award in Croatia and is named after the poet Tin Ujević.

The award was founded in 1980 and is awarded by the Croatian Writers' Society.

== Recipients ==
- 1981: Nikica Petrak, for "Tiha knjiga"
- 1982: Slavko Mihalić, for "Pohvala praznom džepu"
- 1983: Irena Vrkljan, for "U koži moje sestre"
- 1984: Nikola Milićević, for "Nepovrat"
- 1985: Branimir Bošnjak, for "Semantička gladovanja"
- 1986: Igor Zidić, for "Strijela od stakla"
- 1987: Dragutin Tadijanović, for "Kruh svagdanji"
- 1988: Tonko Maroević, for "Trag roga ne bez vraga"
- 1989: Tonći Petrasov Marović, for "Moći ne govoriti"
- 1990: Luko Paljetak, for "Snižena vrata"
- 1991: Vlado Gotovac, for "Crna kazaljka"
- 1992: Zvonimir Golob, for "Rana"
- 1993: Mate Ganza, for "Knjiga bdjenja"
- 1994: Dražen Katunarić, for "Nebo/Zemlja"
- 1995: Vladimir Pavlović, for"Gral"
- 1996: Dubravko Horvatić, for "Ratnoa noć"
- 1997: Boris Domagoj Biletić, for "Radovi na nekropoli"
- 1998: Gordana Benić, for "Laterna magica"
- 1999: Andrijana Škunca, for "Novaljski svjetlopis"
- 2000: Mario Suško, for "Versus axsul"
- 2001: Ivan Slamnig, for "Ranjeni tenk" (posthumous)
- 2002: Petar Gudelj, for "Po zraku i po vodi"
- 2003: Vesna Parun, for "Suze putuju"
- 2004: Alojzije Majetić, for "Odmicanje paučine"
- 2005: Borben Vladović, for "Tijat"
- 2006: Željko Knežević, for "Kopito trajnoga konja"
- 2007: Ante Stamać, for "Vrijeme, vrijeme"
- 2008: Miroslav Slavko Mađer, for "Stihovi dugih naziva"
- 2009: Tomislav Marijan Bilosnić, for "Molitve"
- 2010: Jakša Fiamengo, for "Jeka"
- 2011: Dunja Detoni Dujmić, for "Tiha invazija"
- 2012: Neda Miranda Blažević Krietzman, for "Vezuvska vrata"
- 2013: Vesna Krmpotić, for "Žar-ptica"
- 2014: Slavko Jendričko, for "Evolucija ludila"
- 2015: Ivan Babić, for "Koncepcija vrta"
- 2016: Drago Čondrić, for "Sedam velikih biblijskih poema"
- 2017: Ernest Fišer, for "Preludij za anginu pectoris"
- 2018: Milko Valent for "Otvorena rosa"
- 2019: Božica Jelušić for "Kotačev slavopoj"
- 2020: Drago Štambuk for "Angjeo s bakljom, Atahualpa""
- 2021: Evelina Rudan

== Sources ==
- NAGRADA “TIN UJEVIĆ” (in Croatian)
