= Peruško =

Peruško is a Croatian surname.

It is one of the most common surnames in the Istria County of Croatia.

It may refer to:

- Tone Peruško (1905–1967), Croatian educator, social worker and writer
