= Mate Balota =

Croatian playwright

Mijo Mirković
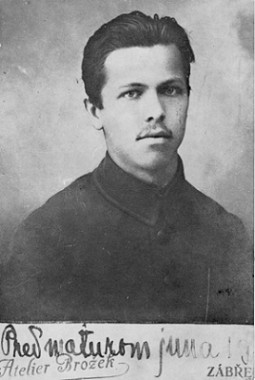
- Mijo Mirković (Mate Balota)
- Born: 28 September 1898; Rakalj, Austrian Littoral, Austria-Hungary
- Died: 17 February 1963 (aged 64); Zagreb, SR Croatia, SFR Yugoslavia
- Education: University of Zagreb; Universität Frankfurt am Main (Ph.D.)
- Occupations: Poet, novelist, economist, professor, academician
- Writing career
- Pen name: Mate Balota
- Notable works: Dragi kamen Tijesna zemlja

Mijo (Miho) Mirković (Croatian pronunciation: [mǐːjo (mǐːxo) mǐːrkɔ̝v̞it͡ɕ]; 28 September 1898 – 17 February 1963), also known by his pen name Mate Balota, was a prominent Croatian poet, novelist and economist. Considered one of the most prominent Croatian poets of the 20th century and often credited as the greatest Istrian poet, he was called "the greatest Istrian after Labin's Matija Vlačić" by Tone Peruško.

Mirković was born in Rakalj, southeastern Istria. His family was evacuated to Moravia at the beginning of the Great War. Upon his return to Croatia he worked as a journalist in Pula before moving to Zagreb, where he graduated from the Faculty of Humanities and Social Sciences. He later studied economy and social sciences in Berlin and Frankfurt, where he had gone in order to examine the original manuscripts of Matija Vlačić. He obtained his doctorate from the University of Frankfurt in 1922, and subsequently taught in Osijek, Subotica and Belgrade. After World War II, he was a professor at the Faculty of Economics in Zagreb until his death. A member of Yugoslav Academy of Sciences and Arts (JAZU) since 1947, he was its Secretary General from 1958 until 1961, and in 1960 received the Lifetime Achievement Award.

Mirković is one of the most appreciated Croatian dialect poets. Beside poetry, he is also known for his narrative and nonfiction books, and for his works on economy. He published many discussions, books and textbooks on the theory of foreign and domestic trade, industrial policy, national economy, history of economy and economics of agriculture, publishing such works as Trade and Domestic Trade Policy (1931), Foreign Trade Policy (1932), Industrial Policy (1936), Agrarian Policy (1940), Economic Structure of Yugoslavia 1918–1941 (1950) and Economic History of Yugoslavia (1958).

His best known work of poetry is the collection Dragi kamen, published in Zagreb in 1938 and named after the 1931 poem, which was later published in several more editions. Described as a nostalgic experience of Istria, a meeting named after the book is held in Rakalj since 1968, in Mirković's honour. Among his other books there are Stara Pazinska Gimnazija and Puna je Pula, the latter a monograph in which Mirković combines fiction with documentary work. These realist texts depict life in the Istrian villages, with both the Istrians' happy and tragic moments. His only novel is Tijesna zemlja: roman iz istarskog narodnog života (1946), an economic and social study in which he portrays life in an Istrian village from the second half of the 19th century until the 1940s, following the life of a family through three generations.

== Early life ==
Mijo Mirković was born in Rakalj, Istria, on the Kvarner Gulf, which at the time was part of Austria-Hungary. He attended the elementary school founded by his father, Ante Mirković-Gaspić, in his native village. Before his ninth birthday, Mirković was already working as a helper-machinist in ships transporting stones from Rakalj to Ancona. He later worked in the local mines, in a print shop and on a railroad.

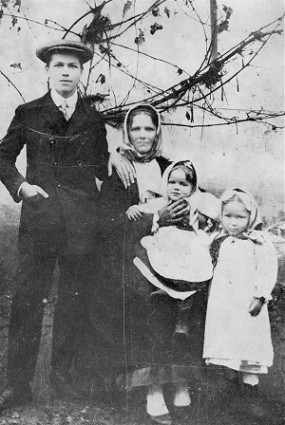
Young Mirković with his mother Marija and sisters in Moravia

Mirković attended the high school Veliku državnu gimnaziju u Pazinu ("Royal Great State Gymnasium") in Pazin, and later in Zábřeh, Moravia (today the Czech Republic). His family had been evacuated to Moravia following the outbreak of World War I.

He later came back to Istria, working as a journalist and an editor for the Pula newspaper Hrvatski list. Mirković was in Pula at the time of the collapse of the Austro-Hungarian Monarchy.

Starting from 1919 he studied philosophy and Slavonic studies in Zagreb and Belgrade. He later studied economics and humanities in Berlin and Frankfurt, where in 1922 he received his doctorate in economics with a thesis titled O glavnom razlogu gospodarske zaostalosti slavenskih naroda ("on the main reason for the economic backwardness of the Slavic peoples"). The dissertation is kept at the Frankfurt University Library.

Mirković had decided to go study in Frankfurt, because there were stored the manuscripts of Vlačić (Flacius), who he considered the "greatest Istrian of all time." His studies of Vlačić's manuscripts in Frankfurt later resulted in his extensive and well-documented work on the reformer. In the interwar period he worked as a substitute professor in several places throughout former Yugoslavia, including the Trade Academy in Osijek and the Maritime Academy in Bakar. He taught at the Subotica Law School (1928–39) and at the Belgrade School of Economics. Mirković also visited many European universities and scientific cultural centers.

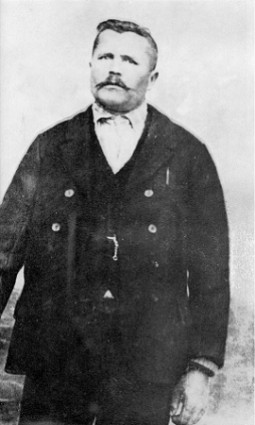
Ante Mirković, father of Balota

The 1930s were an extremely fruitful decade for Mirković. At this time he intensively studied the life and the works of Matija Vlačić Ilirik, publishing Flacius (1938); Matija Vlačić (1957); Matija Vlačić Ilirik (1960). A monograph resulting from these studies, Matija Vlačić-Ilirik I–II was published posthumously. Mirkovic's interest in Labin native Flacius reportedly dated back to his childhood, and it might have been transmitted to him by his mother, who was originally from Skitača, in the Labinština.

In 1938 he published one of his best known works, the Chakavian collection of poems Dragi kamen (literally, "Dear Rock" and also "Precious Stone"). This collection has a "native theme and strong social tone, with a nostalgic experience of Istria."

During the Second World War he completed his only novel Tight Country: A Novel from Istrian Folk Life, or Tijesna zemlja. Roman iz istarskog narodnog života (1946). He united documentary and fiction works in his Puna je Pula (1954). Another well known book by Mirković is Stara Pazinska Gimnazija (1950). Mirković's verist works depict life in the Istrian villages, with the Istrians' happy, sad and tragic moments.

Mirković participated to the Paris Peace Conference, and thus contributed to the annexation of Istria to Croatia. From 1957 until his death he was full professor at the Faculty of Economics in Zagreb. In 1960, he received the Lifetime Achievement Award. Starting from 1947 he was a full member of the Croatian Academy of Sciences and Arts, where he was Secretary General from 1958 until 1961.

Mirković published a large number of university textbooks and works on economy, including Ekonomsku historiju Jugoslavije (1958). He was one of the most prolific writers on economy between the two world wars. He published works on economy history and discussions in the field of foreign and domestic trade theory, agrarian economics, and industrial policy. Such works include Trgovina i unutrašnja trgovinska politika ("Trade and Domestic Trade Policy"), 1931; Spoljna trgovinska politika ("Foreign Trade Policy"), 1932; Industrijska politika ("Industrial Policy"), 1936; Agrarna politika ("Agrarian Policy"), 1940; Ekonomska struktura Jugoslavije 1918–1941 ("Economic Structure of 1918–1941 Yugoslavia"), 1950; Ekonomika agrara FNRJ ("Economics of Agriculture of the Federal People's Republic of Yugoslavia"), 1950; Seljaci u kapitalizmu ("Peasants and Capitalism"), 1952; Ekonomska historija Jugoslavije ("Economic History of Yugoslavia"), 1958; Uvod u ekonomiku Jugoslavije ("Introduction to the Economy of Yugoslavia"), 1959.

Mirković was particularly fond of Labin and its people, possibly due to the fact that his grandmother, Martina, was from nearby Labin.

He died in Zagreb and was buried in Rakalj. His funeral in Rakalj "went into memory as the largest spontaneous funeral Istria had ever seen," with reportedly eight thousands people coming from all parts of the Kvarner and Istria.

== Poetry ==
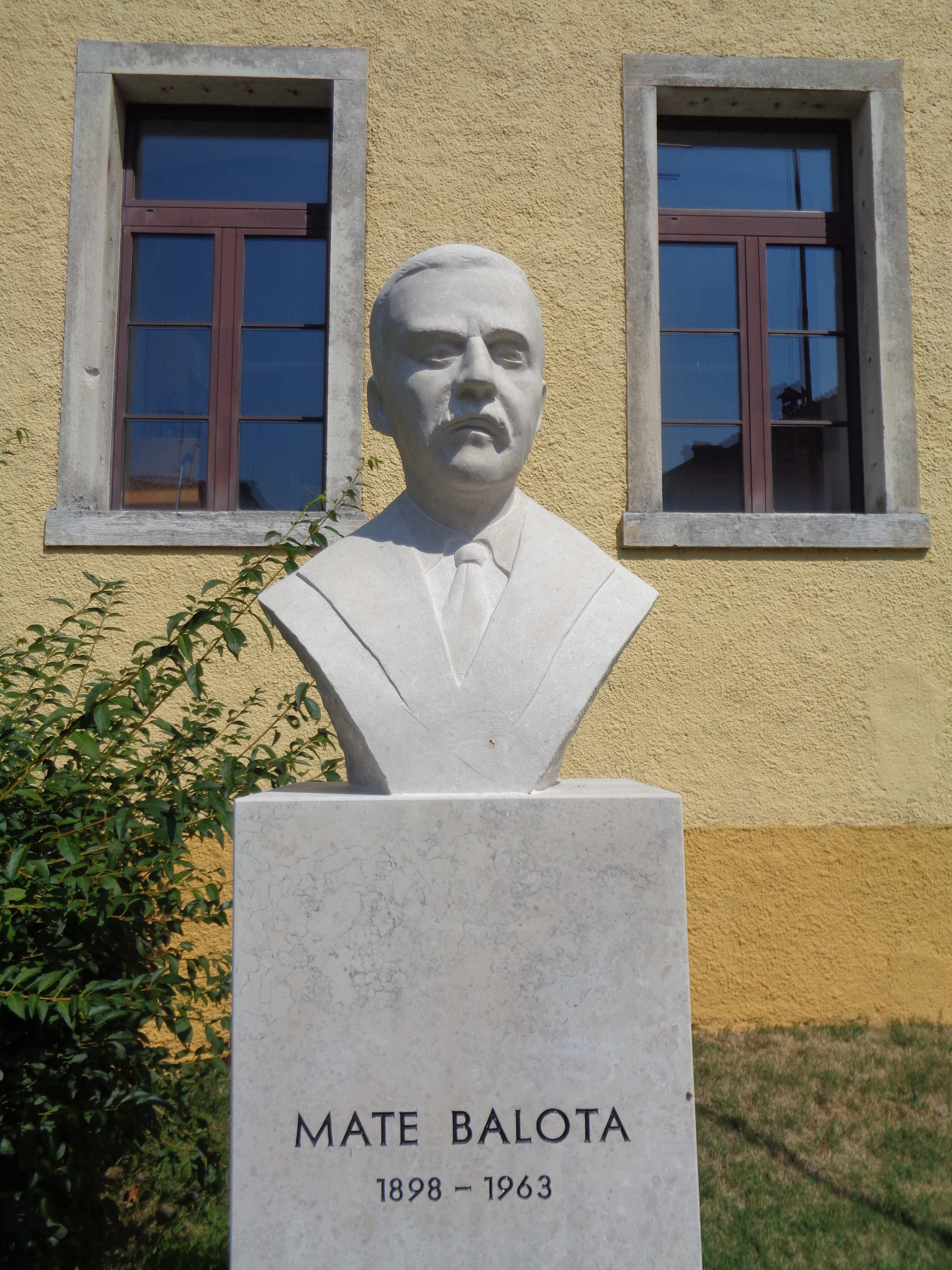
Bust of Mirković in Žminj

Mirković wrote his first poem, Kuraj ("Courage"), about the courage of fishermen at sea at 9. In high school he founded the magazine Nada - Hope, in which he also published his poems.

Mirković is considered one of the leading Croatian poets of the 20th century, is often credited as the greatest poet from Istria, and has been described as the most prominent Istrian of all times, with Tone Peruško crediting him as the second greatest Istrian after Matija Vlačić Ilirik.

His poetry influenced the following generation of poets. He published a total of 50 poems of uniform quality. With his poetry, "he anticipated and touched on important ideological problems and existential doubts of the contemporary intellectual."

The South Istrian Chakavian of his poetry has been described as musical and somewhat archaic. In his songs he has his most unstable verse, which in places is completely free. The rhythm of poetry "often follows the rhythm of folk songs." The "relation to verse, versification and metrics is unpredictable," and the verse is markedly free, as is "the relation to language and its grammatical and orthographic laws, regardless of whether it is written in a dialect or a book-standard." His poems treat urban themes. His collection of poems "became a cult book of Istrian Croats due to its great popularity." Mirković is credited with having expressed in poetry and journalism "the voice of the [common] people of Istria." He is one of the most appreciated Croatian dialect poets.

== Prose ==
His novel and indirect autobiographical work Tijesna zemlja: roman iz istarskog narodnog života (1946) polarizes the critics to this day. It is a socioeconomic study of Istrian villages in the second half of the 19th century and the beginning of the 20th century. In this book he portrays life in an Istrian village, from 1870 until 1941. The novel follows the life of a family through three generations. The narrator speaks in Croatian, while the characters communicate in the dialect of southeastern Istria.

Mirković's feuilleton and travel books, so far "an insufficiently valued part of his oeuvre", confirm him as one of the most prominent Croatian writers in the middle course of the Croatian literature. The thematic of his travelogues is somewhat complementary to Mirković's work in other genres. The thematic framework of his work consists of "social peasant misery, love themes, betrayal and the destinies of emigrants," as well as "travel, the sea, the world of childhood [...] ideological choice and commitment." His other notable works of prose include Proza i poezija ("Poetry and Prose"), 1959, the drama Smrtni grijeh ("Mortal Sin"), 1964, Selected Works (with N. Pavić, P.Ljubić and Drago Gervais in the edition Five Centuries of Croatian Literature, 1973) and a selection from the work Na crvenoj istarskoj zemlji ("On the Red Istrian Land"), 1979.

== Legacy ==
Today, there is a street or square dedicated to Balota in most towns of the Kvarner and Istria, and in cities such as Rijeka, Zadar and Pula. The Faculty of Economics and Tourism "Dr. Mijo Mirković" in Pula owes its name to Mirković. Rijeka's Mijo Mirković School of Economics is named after him.

The scientific conference Susreti na dragom kamenu ("Encounters on a Precious Stone") is held every year in Mirković's honour in his native Rakalj. The historic KSI Mate Balota in Zagreb is named after him. Jadrolinija's MF Mate Balota, mostly sailing around Zadar, is named after him.

== Sources ==
- M. Franičević, Mate Balota, u: Izabrana djela (Pavić, Balota, Ljubić, Gervais), PSHK, 105, Zagreb, 1973
- A.-T. Mirković, Bibliografija Mije Mirkovića – Mate Balote (1918.–1988.), Susreti na dragom kamenu, 1988 (1990)
- B. Biletić (editor), Književno djelo Mate Balote, Zagreb 1998;
- B. Biletić (editor), Mate Balota – Živi glas hrvatske Istre (Izbor iz djela), Vinkovci 1999;
- Zbornik radova o Miji Mirkoviću – Mati Baloti, Kastav 1999;
- A.-T. Mirković, Bibliografija Mije Mirkovića – Mate Balote (1989.–2001.), Spinčići, 2001, 22;
- B. Rudež (editor), Mijo Mirković: hommage uz 100. obljetnicu rođenja, Zagreb 2001.
- Istria on the Internet, Prominent Istrians - Mate Balota - https://www.istrianet.org/istria/illustri/mirkovic/index.htm
- Biografija (in Croatian)
- Biletić, Boris Domagoj. "Mirković, Mijo (Mate Balota)". Istrapedia (in Croatian). Istria County.
