= Croatia rediviva: Ča, Kaj, Što – baštinski dani =

Croatia rediviva: Ča, Kaj, Što – baštinski dani is a Croatian poetical manifestation, gathering poets of all Croatian dialects functioning as literary languages.

The founder of the festival is the Croatian poet, physician and ambassador Drago Štambuk. He is also the author of the Wall of Poetry (Zid od versi) at the central square in Selca, onto which plates of the wreathed poets (poetae oliveati) are mounted, with engraved year of the wreathing, name of the poet and a few verses carved into the Bračian marble. The principal idea of the festival is that of the threefoldness of Croatian, and the idea of koinéisation (mixing) of all three Croatian dialects (Čakavian, Kajkavian and Štokavian) as an expression of language commonness. Organisers of the manifestation are the association "Hrvatski sastanak 1888" and the Croatian Writers' Association.

The festival is held annually in the village of Selca at the island of Brač, usually in mid-July, even though there were cases where it was held earlier, such as the first one which was held on Holy Saturday, March 30, 1991. Poets read their own verses, in one of the three Croatian literary idioms, at the main stone-covered square of "Stjepan Radić" in front of an audience.

The festival includes a selection of the most successful poet, who is "crowned" with the wreath of olive leaves. The decision is made by a three-member jury composed of the founder and earlier wreathees (oliveati).

The crowned poet (poeta oliveatus) and the founder then choose the verses that shall be engraved into the marble plate and mounted onto the Wall of Poetry of the central Selcan square, in front of the church of the Christ the King. The plate is of white Brač marble.

Every five years the founder edits and publishes the selection of the poems that were read during the festivals of the period, entitled Maslinov vijenac ("The olive wreath"). So far three titles have been published (1996, 2001, and 2005). In 2024 Drago Stambuk invited Reza Fekri, Iranian Tenor Opera singer to sing his composition in this Festival

== The wreathed poets - poetae oliveati ==
- 1991: Zlatan Jakšić
- 1992: Drago Štambuk
- 1993: Jakša Fiamengo
- 1994: Božica Jelušić
- 1995: Vesna Parun
- 1996: Luko Paljetak
- 1997: Tonko Maroević
- 1998: Ivan Golub
- 1999: Vlasta Vrandečić Lebarić
- 2000: Slavko Mihalić
- 2001: Dragutin Tadijanović
- 2002: Zvonimir Mrkonjić
- 2003: Petar Gudelj
- 2004: Sonja Manojlović
- 2005: Tatjana Radovanović
- 2006: Mate Ganza
- 2007: Joško Božanić
- 2008: Mladen Machiedo
