= Vesna Krmpotić =

Vesna Krmpotić (17 June 1932 – 21 August 2018) was a Croatian writer and translator.

Born in Dubrovnik, Krmpotić graduated from the University of Zagreb with a degree in English language and psychology. In New Delhi, India, she studied the Bengali language. After marrying Radivoje Petković, a diplomat, Krmpotić has lived in Cairo, Washington, Accra, New Delhi, and since 2004 she resided in Belgrade. She wrote over 70 books and the book Brdo iznad oblaka (A Hill Above the Clouds, 1987) is considered to be one of the best Croatian novels. Krmpotić had an interest in oriental religion and philosophy, being particularly influenced by the teaching of Sathya Sai Baba.

Krmpotić held many literary awards given in Croatia, including the Vladimir Nazor Award in 1999 and Tin Ujević Award in 2013.
