= Zvane Črnja =

Croatian writer

- Črnja in 1989
- Born: 8 October 1920; Črnjeni, near Žminj, Kingdom of Italy
- Died: 26 February 1991 (aged 70); Zagreb, Croatia
- Education: University of Zagreb
- Occupations: Poet, writer, essayist, playwright, screenwriter, journalist, publicist, publisher, filmologist

Zvane (Ivan) Črnja (8 October 1920 – 26 February 1991) was a prominent Croatian poet, prose writer, essayist, culturologist, screenwriter, playwright and filmologist, journalist, publicist, polemicist and publisher. He's considered one of the most important names that Istria gave to Croatia in the 20th century. His aliases include: Osip Suri, Barba Zvane, and Filus.

== Biography ==
Born in the village of Črnjeni, he attended and finished Italian primary school in Žminj. Fleeing fascism, in 1931 he crossed the then Yugoslav-Italian border on the Rječina with his family. He continued his education in Sušak, first at the secondary civic academy and then at the trade academy. His first poetic and prose works appeared in 1938 in Zagreb's Istra and Sušak's Primorje. He was active in the anti-fascist movement of Istrian emigrants. At the beginning of June 1938, he founded the Istrian revolutionary organization Mlada Istra in Zagreb and edited its illegal newspaper Sloboda. In 1940 he enrolled at the College of Economics and Commerce in Zagreb. He participated in the People's Liberation Movement between 1941 and 1945. During the war in Istria and Gorski Kotar he edited Goranski vjesnik and Hrvatski list, and after his release he was the editor-in-chief of Glas Istre, Ilustrirani vjesnik and Vjesnik, and the editor of Epoha, Domet and Most.

In 1948 he wound up in the Goli otok prison camp. From there he was released after a few months; he later managed to restore his social reputation, and it was said that he was sent to Goli Otok only as a remand, and that this was a way to "pardon" him from the socially extremely unpleasant association with the so-called informbiro period.

He studied and graduated in law at the Faculty of Law, University of Zagreb (1950-1954).

In 1969, Zvane Črnja founded the renowned cultural organization Čakavski sabor in Žminj, whose secretary he was until 1977. In 1979 he started a representative publishing project of anthological-encyclopedic editions Istria through the centuries, signing 60 books in 10 rounds as editor-in-chief. He wrote cultural-historical and literary essays and studies, poetry and memoir prose, deeply inspired by Istria, its Chakavian idiom and Croatian cultural and political history.

He is a signatory of the Declaration of the Čakavian Parliament against the regional declaration on the 1971 census, published on 30 January 1971. He died in Zagreb in 1991.

Boris Biletić published an extensive monographic study on the literary work of Zvane Črnja entitled Bartuljska jabuka in 2001. Biletić also contributed to a scientific conference held in Pula in 2004 with a work on Črnja.

The Zvane Črnja Award, an award for the best book of essays published in Croatia, is named in his honor since 2007.

== Bibliography ==
- "Istrian Land" (co-authored with Ivan Bostjančić, with a foreword by Mate Balota, Istarska naklada, Zagreb, 1940), poems,
- "Raša će dati srce" (Published by OOJSRNJ for Istria and Rijeka, Rijeka, 1947), poem,
- "The Story of the Illyrian Land" (Barba Zvane) (Naklada suvremene tehnike, Zagreb, 1953), illustrated poem for children,
- "Žminjski libar, va viersah hrvackeh složen" (Subcommittee of Matica hrvatska in Rijeka and Pula, 1966), poetry,
- "Bezak na tovare" ("Mladost", Zagreb, 1976), poetry,
- "Selected Poems" (Čakavski sabor, Split, 1977),
- "The Story of the Land of Illyria" (Školska knjiga, Zagreb, 1981), a poem for children and youth,
- "Collected Poems" (Čakavski sabor et al., Pula-Rijeka, 1981),
- "One dvi naranče" ("Otokar Keršovani", Opatija, 1988), songs,
- "The Story of the Land of Illyria" ("Otokar Keršovani", Opatija, 1994), a poem for children and youth,
- "Ballads and Romances" (Zavičajna naklada "Žakan Juri", Pula, 2001), poems, with a talk by Aldo Kliman, ISBN 953-6487-17-9

=== Prose ===
- “Dvi beside” (under the pseudonym Osip Suri; “Glas Istre”, Rijeka, 1945), short stories,
- "The Promised Land" ("Glas Istre", Pula, 1978), memoirs,
- "The Promised Land" ("Otokar Keršovani", Opatija, 1988), memoirs,
- "Life in the Grindstone" (Zavičajna naklada "Žakan Juri", Pula, 1997), autobiographical prose, ISBN 953-6487-09-8
- "Istrani" ("Nova Istra", Pula, 1998-2003), dramatic-prose ensemble

=== Views and essays ===
- "Croatian Don Quixote" ("Otokar Keršovan" and, Rijeka, 1971), essays and polemics,
- "Views from the Province" (Čakavian Parliament, Pula, 1978), essays,
- "Conflicts around Krleža" ("Oslobođenje", Sarajevo - "Mladost", Zagreb, 1983), essays and polemics,
- "Forty Years Later" ("Otokar Keršovani", Opatija, 1988), essays,
- "Essays" ("Otokar Keršovani", Opatija, 1988),
- "On the polygon" ("Otokar Keršovani", Opatija, 1988), tours

=== Drama texts, storyboards ===
- “The Last Squad” (M. Katić and F. Hanžeković; Jadran-film, Zagreb, 1948), filming,
- "Born in Blood" (Matica hrvatska, Zagreb, 1948), film script for The Last Squad ,
- "Šćavuni" (Istarska naklada, Pula, 1987), dramatic texts "Why are you sad, Clovio?" (TV novel) and “My Lettuce” (Walking Under the Stars in four shows),
- "Why are you sad, Clovio?" (“Otokar Keršovani”, Opatija, 1988), TV drama

=== Books for children and young people ===
- "The Story of the Illyrian Land" (Barba Zvane) (Naklada suvremene tehnike, Zagreb, 1953), illustrated poem for children,
- "The Story of the Land of Illyria" (Školska knjiga, Zagreb, 1981), a poem for children and youth,
- "The Story of the Land of Illyria" ("Otokar Keršovani", Opatija, 1994), a poem for children and youth

=== Anthology ===
- "Ships of spices in Croatian wrestling poems, decorated with flowers according to the law of good poets" (with Ivo Mihovilović; Dometi, Rijeka, 1969), anthology of Chakavian poetry

=== Monographs, fiction ===
- “Cultural History of Croatia” (“Epoch”, Zagreb, 1965), monograph,
- "Book of Istria" (co-authored with Miroslav Bertoš et al., Školska knjiga, Zagreb, 1968), journalism,
- "Croatia" (in Croatian, French, German, English and Russian; Yugoslav Review, Belgrade, 1976), journalism,
- “Cultural History of Croatia I-III” (“Otokar Keršovani”, Opatija, 1978), monograph,
- “Cultural History of Croatia I-II” (Otokar Keršovani, Opatija, 1988), monograph

=== Film studies ===
- "Stars without a Mask" ("Epoch", Zagreb, 1961), a manual on the development path of film,
- “Film Art” (Školska knjiga, Zagreb, 1962), manual for film education

=== Books written in other languages beside Croatian ===
- “Cultural History of Croatia” (translated by Vladimir Ivir; Office of Information, Zagreb, 1962), monograph, * “History of Croatian Culture” (translated by Petar Gljebov; Secretariat for Information of the Socialist Republic of Croatia, Zagreb, 1965), monograph
- “Histoire de la culture croate” (translated by Janine Matillon; Secretariat for Information of the Socialist Republic of Croatia, Zagreb, 1966), monograph,
- “Conoscere la Croazia” (translated by Mario Kinel; Secretariat for Information of the Socialist Republic of Croatia, Zagreb, 1967), journalism,
- “Get To Know Croatia” (translated by Vladimir Ivir; Secretariat for Information of SR Croatia, Zagreb 1967), journalism,
- “Sotto el lodogno” (Selected lyrics sung in Venetian-Istrian dialect by Giacomo Scotti, Dometi, Rijeka, 1971.), a selection of poems in the Istrian-Venetian dialect,
- “Storia della cultura croata” (translated by Giacomo Scotti; Dometi, Rijeka, 1972), monograph

=== Translations ===
- Eduardo de Filippo: “Millionaire Naples” (1954), translated from Italian,
- Alexandre Dumas: “Three Musketeers” (in two parts, “Globus media”, Zagreb, 2005), translated from French
