= MF Mate Balota =

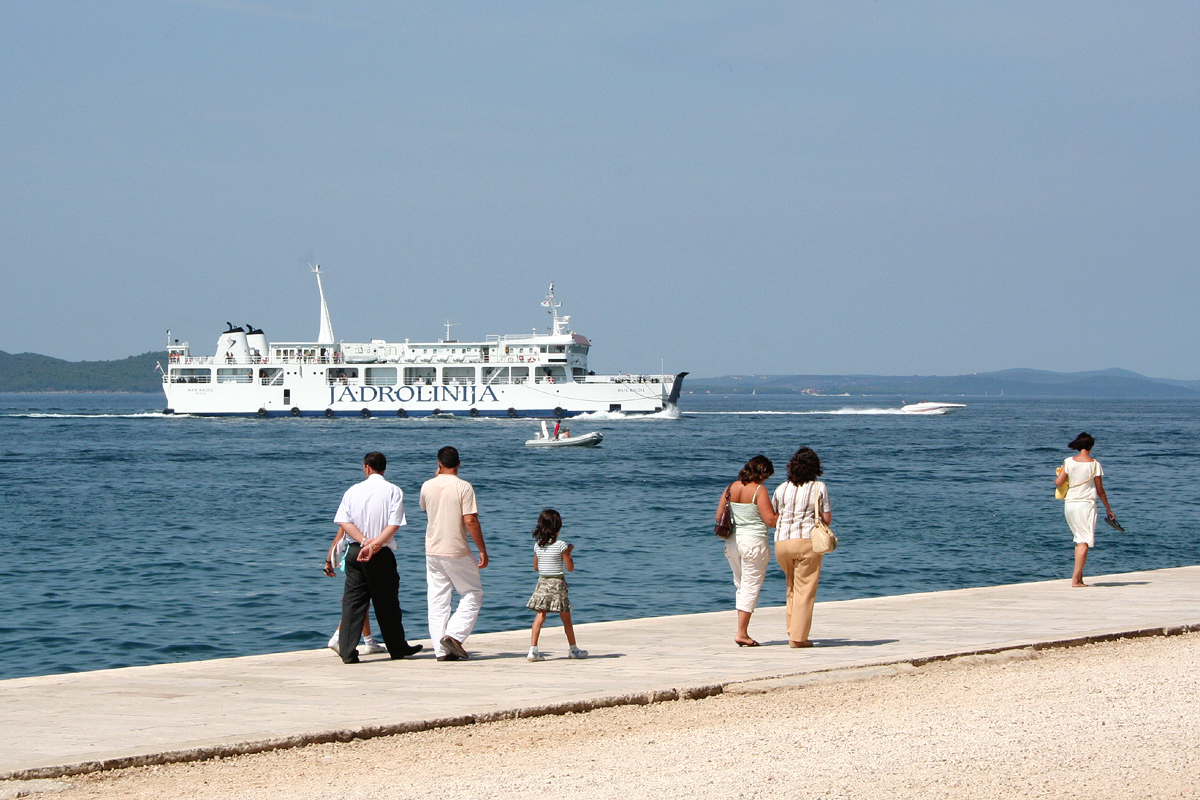
- MF Mate Balota near Zadar

History

Croatia
- Name: Mate Balota
- Owner: Jadrolinija
- Port of registry: Rijeka
- Route: Zadar–Iž–Rava–Mala Rava
- Builder: Kraljevica
- In service: 1988
- Identification: IMO number: 8619912
- Status: In service

General characteristics
- Length: 64.7 m (212 ft 3 in)
- Beam: 13.4 m (44 ft 0 in)
- Draught: 2.8 m (9 ft 2 in)
- Capacity: 440 passengers; 50 cars

MF Mate Balota is a ferry for local lines, part of the fleet of the Croatian shipping company Jadrolinija. It was built in 1988 at the Kraljevica Shipyard. It once sailed on the line Valbiska - Merag. Today MF Mate Balota mostly sails on the lines around Zadar. In January 2018 it started sailing as a replacement on the line Dubrovnik - Suđurađ. In July 2018 it sailed on the line Zadar - Preko. It was named after Mate Balota.

Its capacity is 440 passengers and 50 cars.
