= Tone Peruško =

Croatian educator, social worker and writer

Doctor Tone Peruško
- Painting depicting Peruško
- Born: 27 February 1905; Premantura, Austria-Hungary
- Died: 27 July 1967 (aged 62); Pula, SR Croatia, SFR Yugoslavia
- Occupations: Educator, social worker, professor, writer

Tone Peruško (Croatian pronunciation: [tǒːne pěruʃko]; 27 February 1905 – 27 July 1967), was a Croatian educator, social worker and writer.

Peruško graduated in 1952 from the Higher Pedagogical School and the Faculty of Philosophy in Zagreb. He later became a teacher in Zagreb, a professor at the Italian Teachers' School in Rijeka, and a professor at the Higher Pedagogical School in Zagreb. His contribution to pedagogy in Croatia was significant, and he was the founder of the Pedagogical Academy in Pula.

In his book Knjiga o Istri (A Book about Istria), published posthumously, he argues for a common national identity of Croatian and Italian lower class' people autochthonous of Istria, the Istrian man being "a kind of local patriot, isolated in his intimacy from both Italy and Yugoslavia."

== Biography ==
He was born on February 27, 1905, in Premantura where he attended elementary school until 1915, when he was evacuated to Austria due to the war. After the war he returned to Premantura where he studied shoemaking. However, due to the closure of Croatian schools, he could no longer study in his mother tongue, so he left in 1922 to Yugoslavia. He attended the Teacher's School in Zadar and Šibenik, where he graduated. After graduation, he served as a teacher in the villages of Zagora. As an excellent teacher, he was selected to study and moved to Zagreb, where he graduated at the Higher Pedagogical School and Faculty of Philosophy. At the same time, he was active in the circles of Istrian refugees (Istarski glas, etc.); was an associate and editor-in-chief of the weekly Istra, and one of the founders of Istarska naklada, an association for publishing books and articles. As an anti-fascist, he participated in the work of the NOC for Istria. After the war, he worked in Rijeka as the deputy editor-in-chief of Glas Istre, in addition he collaborated in the editorial office of Rijeka's Novi list and taught in high schools in Rijeka. He went to Zagreb again, where he performed numerous educational duties. In 1950 he started the magazine Školske novine, and is credited with launching Polet. At that time he also published scientific papers: Methodological instructions for the processing of domestic reading in 1956, Orthographic Manual in 1957. Somewhat later, he published the scientific-professional work Materinski jezik u obaveznoj školi (Specijalna didaktika) (Mother Tongue in Compulsory School—Special Didactics), which was later published in five more editions. Peruško worked as a teacher at the Teachers 'School in Zagreb, as a professor at the Italian Teachers' School in Rijeka, and as a professor at the Higher Pedagogical School in Zagreb.

He returned to Pula in 1961, where he founded the Pedagogical Academy, of which he was the first director until his death in 1967. In addition to his organizational work, he continued his pedagogical work here and introduced the subject of Nastava o zavičaju (Teaching about the Homeland), which he rendered compulsory for all students, and for which he cared much about. The introduction of this subject provoked criticism from scientific and political circles, but he made considerable efforts to prove that his initiative was valuable. In the journal Pedagoški rad (Pedagogical paper), 1964, explaining the justification and importance of the "Teaching of the Homeland", he summed up what he deemed the determinants of the Istrian mental being: according to Peruško, the Istrian man remained somewhat in his intimacy somewhere on the border of the Slavic and Latin world, between the Balkans and the Apennines; "he is in fact a kind of local patriot, isolated in his intimacy from both Italy and Yugoslavia." This statement did not only apply to Croats, but also to Istrian autochthonous Italian peasants, fishermen, miners, sailors. The political task of Teaching in the homeland was breaking "that feeling of isolation and removing the feeling of national inferiority," helping that 'man at the crossroads' with knowledge that will become a conviction, best expressed in Peruško's Knjiga o Istri (A Book about Istria), published posthumously by Školska knjiga in 1968, as a co-authored work (Miroslav Bertoša, Josip Bratulić, Zvane Črnja, and others).

Peruško thought that in no country "the national question coincides so much with the peasant question" as in Istria.

Along with Mijo Mirković, Tone Peruško was one of the main initiators of the idea of higher education in Istria. His work of establishment of colleges in istria started a project that would 40 years later result in the establishment of the University of Pula.

== Sources ==
- Z. Črnja, In memoriam Tonu Perušku: Simbolika jedne smrti, Telegram, 393, 10. XI. 1967;
- M. Bertoša, O sastavnicama takozvane lokalne povijesti, Istra, 1977, 2–3;
- A. Došen-Dobud, Prvi direktor puljske Pedagoške akademije, ibid.;
- F. Lajoš, Pedagoški i metodički rad Tone Peruška, ibid.;
- I. Mihovilović, Tone Peruško novinar, ibid.; S. Vukušić, Radovi na polju jezika, ibid.;
- M. Demarin, Život i rad T. Peruška, ibid., 1977, 8–9;
- S. Vukušić (priređivač), Tone Peruško: U svome vremenu, Pula–Rijeka 1984.
