= Abdellatif Laabi =

Moroccan poet

Abdellatif Laabi عبد اللطيف اللعبي
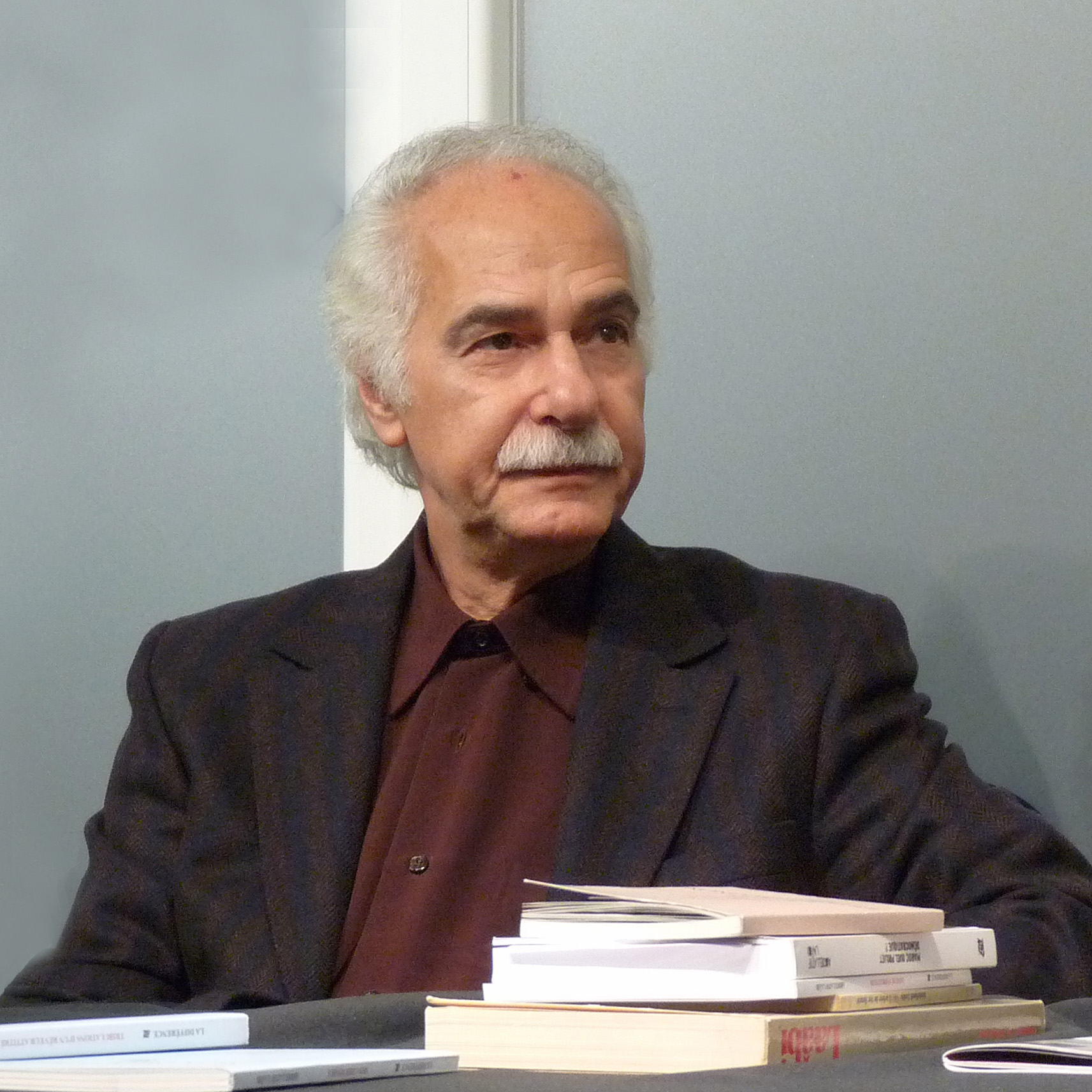
- Born: Abdellatif Laabi; 1942 (age 83–84); Fes, Morocco
- Education: University of Rabat
- Occupations: Poet, novelist, playwright, translator, political activist
- Writing career
- Genres: Poetry, fiction, drama
- Subjects: Political activism, human rights, cultural identity
- Notable works: Le Règne de barbarie, Histoire des sept crucifiés de l'espoir

Signature
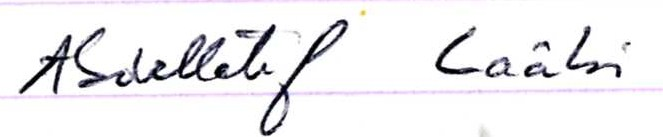

Abdellatif Laâbi (Arabic: عبد اللطيف اللعبي, romanized: ʿAbd al-Laṭīf Laʿābī; born 1942) is a Moroccan poet, journalist, novelist, playwright, translator and political activist.

Laâbi took a degree in French Literature at the University of Rabat, then taught French at a lycée in that city. He founded, with other poets, the artistic journal Souffles, an important literary review in 1966. It was considered as a meeting point of some poets who felt the emergency of a poetic stand and revival, but which, very quickly, crystallized all Moroccan creative energies: painters, film-makers, men of theatre, researchers and thinkers. It was banned in 1972, but throughout its short life, it opened up to cultures from other countries of the Maghreb and those of the Third World.

Abdellatif Laâbi was imprisoned, tortured and sentenced to ten years in prison for "crimes of opinion" (for his political beliefs and his writings) and served a sentence from 1972 to 1980. He was, in 1985, forced into exile in France. The political beliefs that were judged criminal are reflected in the following comment, for example: "Everything which the Arab reality offers that is generous, open and creative is crushed by regimes whose only anxiety is to perpetuate their own power and self-serving interest. And what is often worse is to see that the West remains insensitive to the daily tragedy while at the same time accommodating, not to say supporting, the ruling classes who strangle the free will and aspirations of their people."

== Awards and honors ==
- In 1985, Laabi was made Commander of the Ordre des Arts et des Lettres
- In 1999, he won the Fonlon-Nichols Award
- In 2006, he received the Alain Bosquet Prize, for all of his work
- In 2008, Laabi won the Naim Frashëri Prize
- In 2008, he was awarded the Robert Ganzo Prize of Poetry
- In 2009, he received the Prix Goncourt de la Poésie
- In 2011, he won the Benjamin Fondane International Prize for Francophone Literature
- In 2011, he was awarded Academie française's Grand prix de la francophonie
- In 2015, he won the Prix Ecritures & Spiritualités
- In 2020, he was awarded the Mahmoud Darwish Award for Culture and Creativity
- In 2021, Laabi won the Roger Kowalski Award for Poetry, for his collection, Presque riens

== Works ==
Each year for a first edition links to its corresponding "[year] in poetry" article for poetry or "[year] in literature" article for other works:

=== Poetry ===
- 1980: Le Règne de barbarie. Seuil, Paris (épuisé)
- 1980: Histoire des sept crucifiés de l'espoir. La Table rase, Paris
- 1981: Sous le bâillon le poème. L'Harmattan, Paris
- 1985: Discours sur la colline arabe. L'Harmattan, Paris
- 1986: L'Écorché vif. L'Harmattan, Paris
- 1990: Tous les déchirements. Messidor, Paris (épuisé)
- 1992: Le soleil se meurt. La Différence, Paris
- 1993: L'Étreinte du monde. © La Différence et © Abdellatif Laâbi, Paris
- 1996: Le Spleen de Casablanca. La Différence, Paris
- 2000: Poèmes périssables, La Différence, coll. Clepsydre, Paris (épuisé)
- 2003: L'automne promet, La Différence, coll. Clepsydre, Paris
- 2003: Les Fruits du corps, La Différence, coll. Clepsydre, Paris
- 2005: Écris la vie, La Différence, coll. Clepsydre, Paris, Prix Alain Bosquet 2006
- 2003: Œuvre poétique, La Différence, coll. Œuvre complète, Paris
- 2007: Mon cher double, La Différence, coll. Clepsydre, Paris
- 2008: Tribulations d'un rêveur attitré, coll. La Clepsydre, La Différence, Paris
- 2010: Oeuvre poétique II, La Différence
- 2016: Le Principe d'incertitude, La Différence
- 2018: L'Espoir à l'arraché, Le Castor astral
- 2020: Presque riens, Le Castor astral
- 2022: La poésie est invincible, Le Castor astral

=== Novels ===
- 1969: L'Œil et la Nuit, Casablanca, Atlantes, 1969; SMER, Rabat, 1982; La Différence, coll. "Minos", Paris, 2003
- 1982: Le Chemin des ordalies. Denoël, Paris; La Différence, coll. "Minos", Paris, 2003
- 1989: Les Rides du lion. Messidor, Paris (épuisé); La Différence, coll. "Minos", Paris, 2007

=== Drama ===
- 1987: Le Baptême chacaliste, L'Harmattan, Paris
- 1993: Exercices de tolérance, La Différence, Paris
- 1994: Le Juge de l'ombre, La Différence, Paris
- 2000: Rimbaud et Shéréazade, La Différence, Paris

=== Children's books ===
- 1986: Saïda et les voleurs de soleil; bilingue français-arabe; images de Charles Barat. Messidor/La Farandole, Paris, (épuisé)
- 1995: L'Orange bleue; illustrations de Laura Rosano. Seuil Jeunesse, Paris

=== Other works ===
- 1983: Chroniques de la citadelle d'exil; lettres de prison (1972–1980), Denoël, Paris; La Différence, Paris, 2005.
- 1985: La Brûlure des interrogations; entretiens-essais (réalisés par J. Alessandra). L'Harmattan, Paris
- 1997: Un continent humain; entretiens, textes inédits. Paroles d'aube, Vénissieux
- 2005: D'humus et de lave; poème manuscrit; gravures de Bouchaïb Maoual; édition limitée à 12 exemplaires; Al Manar

=== Translations from Arabic ===
- 1982: Rires de l'arbre à palabre (poèmes), d'Abdallah Zrika. L'Harmattan, Paris
- 1983: Rien qu'une autre année (poèmes), de Mahmoud Darwich. Unesco/Éditions de Minuit, Paris, 1983.
- 1986: Soleil en instance (roman), de Hanna Mina. Unesco/Éditions Silex, Paris, 1986.
- 1987: Autobiographie du voleur de feu (poèmes), d'Abd al-Wahhab Al-Bayati. Unesco/Actes Sud, Paris, 1987.
- 1988: Je t'aime au gré de la mort (poèmes), de Samih al-Qâsim. Unesco/Éditions de Minuit, Paris, 1988.
- 1989: Plus rares sont les roses (poèmes), de Mahmoud Darwich. Éditions de Minuit, Paris, 1989.
- 1990: La Poésie palestinienne contemporaine (anthologie). Éditions Messidor, Paris, 1990.
- 1990: L'Espace du Noûn (poèmes), de Hassan Hamdane. En collaboration avec Leïla Khatib. Éditions Messidor, Paris
- 1991: Les Oiseaux du retour. Contes de Palestine, bilingues. En collaboration avec Jocelyne Laâbi. Éditions Messidor/La Farandole, Paris
- 1992: La Joie n'est pas mon métier (poèmes), de Mohammed Al-Maghout. Éditions de la Différence, coll. Orphée, Paris
- 1997: Retour à Haïfa (nouvelles), de Ghassan Kanafani. En collaboration avec Jocelyne Laâbi. Actes-Sud, Paris

=== Adaptations (drama) and other publications ===
- 1984: Va ma terre, quelle belle idée. Pièce tirée du Chemin des ordalies, roman. Compagnie des Quatre Chemins, dirigée par Catherine de Seynes. Paris
- 1984: Histoire des sept crucifiés de l'espoir. Atelier-théâtre du Septentrion, dirigé par Robert Condamin et Jacqueline Scalabrini. Antibes
- 1984: Chroniques de la citadelle d'exil. Théâtre Expression 7, Guy Lavigerie. Limoges, 1984.
- 1987: Saïda et les voleurs de soleil. Atelier-théâtre du Septentrion. Antibes, 1987.
- 1988: Le Règne de barbarie. Compagnie du Mentir-Vrai, dirigée par Omar Tary. Lille
- 1988: Journal du dernier homme. Tiré des Rides du lion, roman. Lecture par Edwine Moatti et Denis Manuel. Paris
- 1992: Le Retour de Saïda. Atelier-théâtre du Septentrion. Antibes, 1992.
- 1994: Le Soleil se meurt. Théâtre d'Aujourd'hui. Casablanca

=== Autobiography ===
- 2004: Le fond de la Jarre (translated in Spanish: Fez es un espejo, Madrid, ediciones del oriente y del mediterráneo
- 2021: La Fuite vers Samarkand, Le Castor astral

=== Works available in English ===
- 2003: The World's Embrace: Selected Poems. City Lights, 2003. Translated by V. Reinking, A. George, E. Makward.
- 2009: Fragments of a Forgotten Genesis. Leafe Press, 2009. Translated by Gordon & Nancy Hadfield.
- 2012: The Rule of Barbarism. Pirogue Poets series, 2012. Translated by André Naffis-Sahely
- 2013: The Bottom of the Jar. Archipelago Books, 2013. Translated by André Naffis-Sahely
- 2013: Poems. Poetry Translation Centre, 2013. Translated by André Naffis-Sahely
- 2013: Little Things. Leafe Press, 2013. Translated by Alan Baker
- 2016: Beyond the Barbed Wire: Selected Poems of Abdellatif Laâbi. Carcanet Press, 2016. Translated by André Naffis-Sahely
- 2016: In Praise of Defeat. Archipelago Books, 2016. Translated by Donald Nicholson-Smith (shortlisted for the 2017 Griffin Poetry Prize)
- 2021: The Uncertainty Principle. Lithic Press, 2021. Translated by Annie Jamison
- 2023: Poetry is Invincible. Penniless Press, 2023. Translated by Howard Slater http://www.pennilesspress.co.uk/poetry/Laabi.htm
