= Domenico da Capodistria =

Dominicus was a sculptor from Venice

Domenico da Capodistria or Dominicus (Slovene: Dominik Koprčan; literally, Dominic of Capodistria) (1387 – c. 1463) was an architect and sculptor from Koper (Italian: Capodistria), Republic of Venice.

== Life ==
There is only scant information about Domenico's life. He was born in Capodistria (Koper), Republic of Venice, studied in Venice and Florence, and reportedly was a pupil of Filippo Brunelleschi. By the second decade of the 15th century, he was already a master. A tabernacle in the old church of Rakalj has been attributed to him.

Domenico later moved to Central Italy, where, in the mid-15th century, he contributed to the Santa Maria di Collemaggio in L'Aquila. He might have been one of the artists who built the triumphal arch of Castel Nuovo in Naples. His name appears in the Trattato di Architettura by Filarete, who cites him as one of the artists who might have contributed to the creation of the imaginary ideal city Sforzinda.

Domenico's best-known work is the octagonal chapel of Vicovaro, commissioned by Francesco Orsini, which he started in 1454. However, he was not able to finish the work, and the chapel was completed by Giovanni Dalmata.

His works are distinguished by "simple and harmonious architecture", partly in the style of the late Gothic, also enriched by elements of the flourishing Venetian Renaissance.
