= Nicole Cage-Florentiny =

French poet and novelist from Martinique

Nicole Cage-Florentiny is a poet and novelist, born on 12 September 1965 in Le François, Martinique. She is a teacher of literature and Spanish, a psychotherapist and the founder of the publisher Cimarrón EdiProd.

In her writing Cage-Florentiny addresses contemporary and sometimes taboo subjects in Martinique society; her first novel C’est vole que je vole, is "a novel on madness and massacred childhood". She has also written stories for children, to support the development of their cultural awareness.

She has travelled widely to perform at poetry festivals across the Caribbean, the Americas, Europe and North Africa. Cage-Florentiny regularly produces "pawol ek mizik" shows mixing spoken word, song, dance and visual arts with musical accompaniament. Her writing has been translated into Albanian, English, Arabic, Spanish, Macedonian, Portuguese and Romanian and has appeared in literary magazines in Albania, Macedonia (in the anthology, "Ditët ë Naïmit"), the United States (MaComère, San Francisco Bay View), Lebanon, Romania and Latin America.

== Works ==
- 1996: Arc-en-ciel, l'espoir, poems in bilingual edition (trans. Nancy Morejón), Casa de las Américas, Cuba
- 2000: Confidentiel, children's novel, Édition Dapper, Paris
- 2002: L'Espagnole, Hatier Publishing, Paris
- 2005 and 2006: Aime comme musique ou comme mourir d'aimer, novel, published by Le Manuscrit and Scripta in 2006
- 2006: C'est vole que je vole, Les Oiseaux de papier, Bretagne
- 2007: Et tu dis que tu m'aimes, Les Oiseaux de papier, Bretagne
- 2007: Une robe couleur soleil conte pour enfants, Éditions Lafontaine, Fort-de-France
- 2007: Palabras de paz por tiempos de guerra, poems, El Perro y la Rana, Caracas
- 2008: Dèyé pawol sé lanmou / Beyond words, love, bilingual poems (French/Creole) Preface by Frankétienne, K Éditions, Fort-de-France
- 2009: Vole avec elle, novel, éditions Acoria, Paris

== Prizes ==
- 1996: Awarded the Casa de las Américas Prize in Cuba for her collection of poems Arc-en-Ciel, l'espoir
- 2002: Oeneumi Prize, at the Ditet e Naimit International Festival in the Republic of Macedonia, for a selection of unpublished poems
- 2004: Creativity Prize from the NAAMAN Foundation for Culture in Lebanon for Paroles de paix pour temps de guerre, poems
- 2006: Gros Sel Prize for her novel C'est vole que je vole
