= Boris Domagoj Biletić =

Croatian poet, literary critic, essayist, publicist and translator

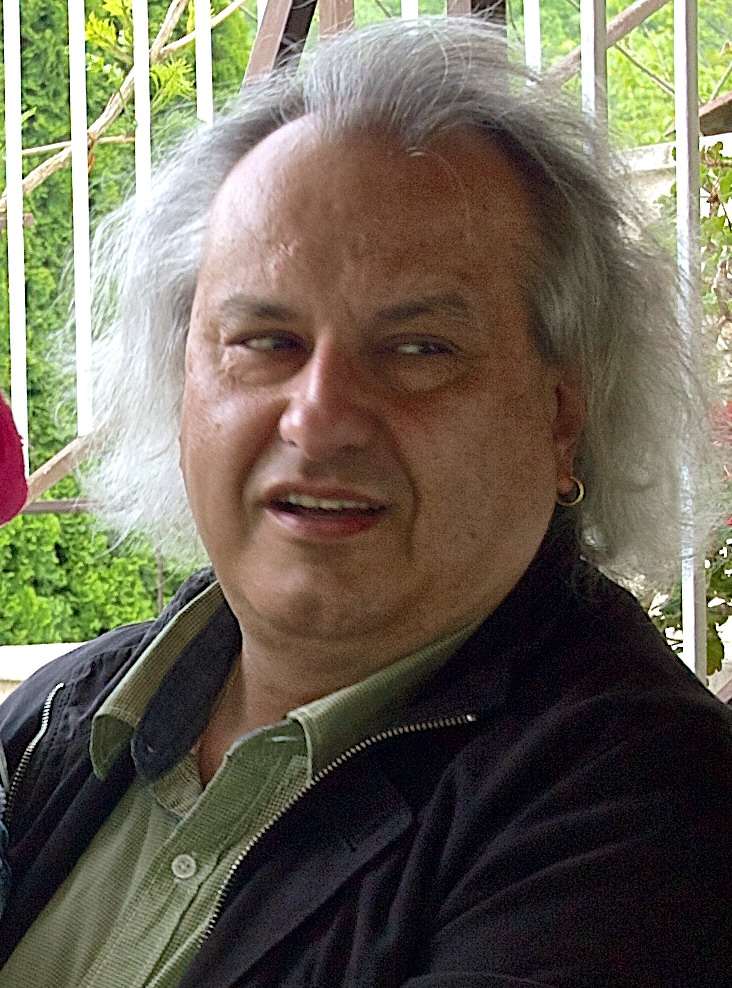
- Born: 22 March 1957; Pula, Yugoslavia
- Education: University of Zagreb
- Occupation: Writer
- Awards: Order of Danica Hrvatska

Boris Domagoj Biletić (born 22 March 1957) is a Croatian poet, literary critic, essayist, publicist and translator. Biletić is the vice-president of the Croatian Writers' Association. He was awarded the Order of Danica Hrvatska with the figure of Marko Marulić in 1996 for his contribution to Croatian culture.

== Biography ==
Biletić was born in Pula, Istria. He completed primary school, grammar school and the Pedagogical Academy (in 1978) in his hometown. He graduated from the University of Zagreb and got his master's degree at the Department of Croatian and South Slavic Philology at the Faculty of Philosophy in Zagreb. His thesis was Regionalism, Identity and Croatian Literature of Istria 1918–1945. Biletić worked briefly as a teacher, later as a freelance artist (for two years) and finally as a librarian at the Matija Vlačić Ilirik City Library of Rovinj, eventually becoming the library's director.

Biletić started publishing his first articles for the magazine Istarski borac. He has been publishing poetry, studies, essays and translations since the 1970s. Until the 1990s Biletić was a member of the board of the Pula magazine Istra and Istria through the centuries (Istra kroz stoljeća) issued by the Čakavian Parliament, of which he was an active member. He is the editor-in-chief of literary magazine Nova Istra and since 2009 a member of Matica hrvatska. Biletić was a member of the Croatian PEN Center from 1993 until 2013, and today is the vice-president of the Croatian Writers' Association.

== Awards and recognitions ==
- Mlada Struga Award (1984, for Zublja šutnje)
- Order of Danica Hrvatska with the figure of Marko Marulić (1996, for his contribution to Croatian culture)
- Tin Ujević Award (1997, for Radovi na nekropoli)
- Medal of the City of Rovinj (1997)
- Award of the Austrian Foundation "KulturKontakt" (2002, for the monographic study Bartuljska jabuka)
- Julije Benešić Award (2008, for the book Pristrani čitatelj I-II as the best book of literary criticism by a Croatian literary critic, published between June 2007 and June 2008)
- Plaque of St. Kvirina|hr| (2012, for his contribution to Croatian poetry)
- Fran Galović Award (2013, for the monograph Istarski pisci i obzori: regionalizam, identitet i hrvatska književnost Istre pod fašizmom)
