= Tight Country: A Novel from Istrian Folk Life =

1946 novel by Mijo Mirković

Tight Country
- Cover of the 1983 edition
- Author: Mate Balota
- Language: Standard Croatian; Čakavian
- Genre: Realism
- Publication date: 1946
- Publication place: Yugoslavia
- Pages: 296
- OCLC: 879087269

Tight Country: A Story from Istrian Folk Life (Croatian: Tijesna zemlja: roman iz istarskog narodnog života) is a novel by Croatian author Mijo Mirković, published under his pen name Mate Balota.

The novel tells the story of the life of people on a small piece of Istrian land. Through 20 chapters "the seasons change, people, births, deaths, changes happen, life happens." The action takes place in the area of the village of Rakalj, in southeastern Istria. Described as "an economic and social study of the Istrian villages in the second half of the nineteenth and early twentieth century," and "an indirect autobiography," the novel follows the history of an Istrian family through three generations, from 1870 to 1941. Although it wasn't well received in the 1940s, the book later became a cult among Istrian Croats.

== Analysis ==
With this novel Mirković sought to portray those people "who were not recorded in historical annals," people who nevertheless did play their roles, some of them taking an active part in shaping history, and some doing so passively. These are "little people who, in the whirlwind of time and the changes it brings, try to find their place under the sun." The people are plagued by the dramas of their country and their own family. The characters of the novel strike a chord in the reader. The reader's bond to the characters grows as the plot unfolds. It has been said of Mirković that "older Istrians can find [in his poems] their youth or the youth of their parents and grandparents as they described it in [their anecdotes transmitted orally]."

The story of the "little men" quietly wins the sympathy of the reader. There are "processions, joy, but also the saddest moments" that alternate in their lives, with each character in the novel portrayed on several levels. The narrator speaks in Croatian, but the characters use the dialect of southeastern Istria.

The novels echoes folk songs and rural conversations, as well as "solitary reflections on man, labor, God, justice and the changes to come." The novel portrays the socioeconomic situation and rural life of old Istria.
