= Vesna Parun =

Croatian poet

- Born: 10 April 1922; Zlarin, Kingdom of Serbs, Croats and Slovenes
- Died: 25 October 2010 (aged 88); Stubičke Toplice, Croatia
- Resting place: Grohote, Šolta
- Occupation: Poet
- Writing career
- Language: Croatian
- Period: 1947–2001

Vesna Parun (Croatian pronunciation: [v̞ê̞sna pâruːn]; 10 April 1922 – 25 October 2010) was a Croatian poet.

== Biography ==
After schooling in Zlarin, Šibenik, and Split, she studied Romance languages and philosophy at the Faculty of Humanities and Social Sciences, University of Zagreb. From 1947 she was an independent writer, writing poetry, essays, criticism, and children's literature. She translated works from Slovene, German, French, and Bulgarian. Her first book of poetry Dawns and Whirlwinds (1947) 'contrasts the youthful vibrancy, love and nature with death and the destructive forces of war'. It received negative reviews from the socialist-realist critics, who saw it as "apolitical" and "decadent", possibly for not conforming to tendencies to ideologize post-World War II poetry.

Starting with the poetry collection Black Olive Tree (1955), love was the primary motif of her written opus. Incessantly working on romantic lyrical poetry, from the 1960s on, she published satiric verses directed at politics and the erotic. She wrote more than 20 works for children alone, the most prominent and widely performed being Mačak Džingiskan i Miki Trasi (1968). She also wrote several drama pieces, including Marija i mornar (1960). Parun spent many years living in Sofia, Bulgaria, primarily in the 1960s, until she was falsely accused by the Bulgarian authorities of spying for the Yugoslavian government, and forced to leave the country in 1967, never to return again. While in Bulgaria, she wrote poetry, conducted recitals, and forged friendships with some of the country's most renowned poets and intellectuals, like Radoy Ralin, Blaga Dimitrova, and Vanya Petkova, and remains a prominent name in Bulgaria to this day.

She was the first Croatian woman to earn a living solely by writing literature. She published, printed, and illustrated some of her own works.

== Selected works ==
Parun's other significant works include:

- Vidrama vjerna (1957)
- Patka Zlatka (1957)
- Ti i nikad (1959)
- Konjanik (1961)
- Otvorena vrata (1968)
- Ukleti dažd (1969)
- Stid me je umrijeti (1974)
- Igre pred oluju (1979)
- Šum krila, šum vode (1981)
- Salto mortale (1981)
- Pokraj rijeke Kupe kad se vrapci skupe (1989)
- Nedovršeni mozaik (1990)
- Ptica vremena (1996)
- Smijeh od smrti jači (1997)
- Mozak u torbi (2001)
- More jadransko (2001)
- Noć za pakost: moj život u 40 vreća (2001)
- Da sam brod (2002)
- Suze putuju (2002)

== Awards ==
- 1959 – Poet of the Year Award
- 1982 – Vladimir Nazor Award for the lifetime achievement
- 1995 – Poeta Oliveatus at the "Croatia rediviva: Ča, Kaj, Što – baštinski dani" festival.
- 2002 – Visoka žuta žita charter at the Poet Meetings in Drenovci for her overall literary opus and abiding contribution to the Croatian literature
- 2003 – Tin Ujević Award, for the collection of sonnets Suze putuju
- 2010 – European Award – Knjizevna opstina Vrsac (Literary Municipality of Vrsac)
