= A Hill Above the Clouds =

1987 novel by Vesna Krmpotić

Brdo iznad oblaka
- Author: Vesna Krmpotić
- Language: Croatian
- Publisher: Globus
- Publication date: 1987-9
- Publication place: Croatia
- Media type: Print

A Hill Above the Clouds (Croatian: Brdo iznad oblaka) is a 1987 (1988 and 1989 also cited) Croatian autobiographical novel by Vesna Krmpotić. The novel is about a mother who has to come to terms with her four-year-old son being diagnosed with leukemia and efforts to cure him. Globus published a copy of the book in Zagreb in 1989.

== Background ==
Born in Dubrovnik, Krmpotić began her career as a poet and was among the first in Croatia to study and translate Indian literature. She learned Bengali while living in India, and her work shows the influence of Indian philosophy. Krmpotić has also lived in Egypt, the United States and Ghana, and while in the US she learned that her four-year-old son was suffering from lymphoblastic leukemia. In her book, A Hill Above the Clouds, Vesna documents the futile efforts she made to save her son's life through the ancient philosophies of Egypt and India. In the process, she encounters Sai Baba, which had a profound impact on her life and writing. In the book, her diary entries records her son's life from the time of his birth, symptoms of his disease, the trials and tribulations she faced to get him treated, her son's reaction to his sufferings and the boy realizing his state of health when he gives his toys away with a tragic comment: "Take them because I'll never come back."

Krmpotić wrote the book "in one breath" in 1981, six years after her son's death.

== Analysis ==
According to Helena Forsas-Scott, the author "explores all possible avenues of treatment, official and alternative, and in the process describes an ultimately triumphant journey to a wide embracing faith, embracing aspects of many philosophies, including Ancient Egyptian and Indian". She further states that although it is not essentially a feminist work, it demonstrates the flexibilities of such women writers. One reviewer stated that it "looks like a novel but it does not have fictional characters and situations", remarking that it is a "kind of autobiography", with "faithful reportage of events and facts". A Hill Above the Clouds has been compared to Slavenka Drakulić's Hologrami straha (Holograms of Fear, 1987), which details her kidney dialysis and transplant experiences.

== Bibliography ==
- Forsas-Scott, Helena (13 November 2014). Textual Liberation (Routledge Revivals): European Feminist Writing in the Twentieth Century. Taylor & Francis. ISBN 978-1-317-57814-7.
- Parker, Alan; Willhardt, Mark (5 December 2005). Who's Who in Twentieth Century World Poetry. Routledge. ISBN 1-134-71376-2.
