= Dražen Katunarić =

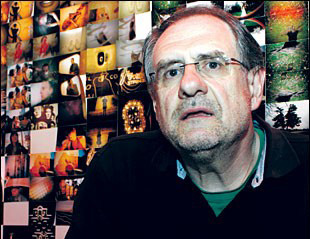
Dražen Katunarić

Dražen Katunarić (born 25 December 1954) is a Croatian poet, essayist, novelist and editor.

== Early life and education ==
Katunarić was born in 1954 in Zagreb where he spent his childhood and completed secondary schooling. He studied philosophy at the University of Human Sciences in Strasbourg.

== Career ==
- 1991–1993 Editor of the Literary Journal "Lettre internationale" – Croatian Edition.
- Since 1993, editor in chief of the Literary Journal The Bridge and The European Messenger (HDP).
- 2001–2006 Vice-president of Croatian P.E.N. Centre

Since 1980 he has published poems, essays, travelogues, novels, tales, articles in Croatian and foreign reviews and translated into French, English, Spanish, Italian, Hungarian, Bulgarian, Slovenian, Romanian, Macedonian, Albanian, German, and Corsican.

On May 16, 2024, he was elected Full Member of the Croatian Academy of Sciences and Arts.

== Selected bibliography ==
- Bacchus in marble (poems), Zagreb 1983
- Sand Trap (poems), Zagreb 1985
- Imposture (poems), Zagreb 1987
- At Sea (poems), Zagreb 1988
- Psalms (poems), Zagreb 1990
- The Abrupt Voice (poems), Zagreb 1991
- The House of Decadence (essays), Zagreb 1992
- Sky/Earth (poems), Zagreb 1993
- Church, Street, Zoo (travelogue) Zagreb 1994
- The Return of the Barbarogenius (essays), Zagreb 1995
- The Poem of Stjepan (poems), Zagreb 1996
- Diocletian's Palace (essays), Zagreb-Split 1997
- The Story of the Cave (essays), Zagreb 1998
- Glue for Nightingale (poems), Zagreb 1999
- The Readed Heart (selected poems), Zagreb 1999
- Parabola (poems) Zagreb 2001
- Fatal Image (novel), Zagreb 2002
- Tiger Balm (tales), Zagreb, 2005
- The Lyre/Delirium (poems), Zagreb 2006
- The beggar woman (novel), Zagreb, 2009
- Infernet and Others Texts (essay), Zagreb 2010
- Chronos (poems), Zagreb 2011
- One Day it Was a Night (selected and new poems), 2015
- The Smile of Padre Pio (novel), Zagreb 2017
- Sign in the Shadow (poems), Zagreb 2017
- Farewell, Desert (novel), Zagreb 2022
- What Zeus whispered to me? (poems), Zagreb 2023

== Published books abroad ==
- Ecclesia invisibilis (selected poems), Academia Orient. Occident, Bucurest, 2001
- Isolomania (selected poems), Albiana, Ajaccio, France, 2004
- Cherries (selected poems), Blue Aster Press, N.Y., 2004
- Kthimi i barbrogjenive, Ditet e Naimit, Tetove 2007
- Ciel/Terre, L'Arbre à paroles", Amay, 2008
- Le baume du tigre, Mode Est-Ouest, Bruxelles, 2009
- Die Bettlerin, Leykam, Graz, 2009
- La mendiante, Mode Est-Ouest, Bruxelles, 2012.
- Cer/Pămînt, Cronedit, Iaşi, 2016
- Poem efemer, ronedit, Iaşi, 2016
- La maison du déclin, M.E.O. Editions, Bruxelles, 2017
- Cronos, Krivodol, Buenos Aires, 2017
- Je reste plus longtemps dans la mer, L'Ollave, Lyon, 2023

== Awards ==
- 1984. "Branko Radičević" Award for the best poetry book in Yugoslavia
- 1994. "Tin Ujević" - Croatian Writers Association Award for the best poetry book in 1993
- 1999. Award of Matrix Croatica for Literature for the best collection of poetry in 1998
- 1999. "European Circle Award" for Literature
- 1999. The title "Knight of Arts and Literature" by French Ministry of Culture
- 2002. Macedonian price "Menada", "for the specific value of poetry"
- 2009. Austrian Steiermaerkische Sparkasse price for the novel The beggar woman (Die Bettlerin)
- 2015. Balcanica Price for poetry (Romania)
- 2018. "Dragutin Tadijanović" Award for the collection of poetry Sign of the Shadow
- 2022. "Olive Wreath" for poetry, Croatia rediviva, Selce
- 2023. Finalist of the Mallarmé price in with a book Je reste plus longtemps dans la mer
