= Lidija Percan =

Istrian Croatian singer (born 1938)

- Born: 16 March 1938; Rakalj, Kingdom of Italy
- Occupation: Singer
- Years active: 1968–present
- Awards: Order of the Croatian Interlace

Lidija Percan (born 16 March 1938) is an Istrian Croatian singer. Although she sings both in Croatian and Italian, Percan rose to fame in Yugoslavia principally thanks to her songs in the Italian language and mostly in the Venetian language, both original songs and popular ones, such as her well-known hits "La mula de Parenzo", "La bella campagnola", and "Bella ciao".

Percan is credited with significantly helping to spread the Italian language and culture in former Yugoslavia.

== Biography ==
She was born in Rakalj, in Eastern Istria, on 16 March 1938. Although she considers herself an Istrian Croat, Percan was born into a family speaking Italian at home. She got first involved in music in the local church of her hometown Rakalj. At fifteen she moved to Pula, where she started to attend the local Italian community. As a child, she prayed to the Madonna that she may become as beautiful as her, and that she may just sing.

In Pula she came across texts of sacred music at the church of Sant'Antonio, later becoming the first singer of Pula's Italian community. She used to go to Trieste to buy sheet music. Percan was noted by major producers, and signed by Jugoton. Many of her best known songs of the album Canzoni d'una volta were composed by Stipica Kalogjera. She credited Kalogjera with giving a fundamental contribution to her music. Percan experienced true musical affirmation during her musical collaboration with the late Đorđe Novković, who recognized her great vocal abilities and composed unforgettable melodies for the Istrian musician.

Percan has expressed regret at the disuse of the Italian language in Croatia, as well as at having been "neglected" by the Italian community in spite of her endeavors to promote the Italian language and Culture in Croatia and former Yugoslavia. In 2008 Percan was involved in a conflict with Herzegovinian priest Tomislav Hrstić, with the latter reportedly denying her to sing in the Italian language during mass at Pula's Sant'Antonio church.

In 2019 she was awarded the Order of the Croatian Interlace by Croatian President Kolinda Grabar-Kitarović.

During her career Percan sang both in New York City (1972) and the Soviet Union, at a show attended by about 5 thousand people.

During the time of Yugoslavia, Percan also sang for the soldiers in the Yugoslav barracks. In a 2018 interview she stated that singing in post-war Yugoslavia was a "beautiful sensation," and that she never had any problems or found any hindrances.

When asked which of her songs she is most fond of, Percan replied that she is especially bound to all songs from Canzoni di una volta, while among her songs in Croatian she particularly cherishes Hiljadu suza za jednog mornara and Sve su se laste vratile sa juga, composed by Đorđe Novković.
