= University of Pula =

Public university in Pula, Croatia

Juraj Dobrila University of Pula
- Sveučilište Jurja Dobrile u Puli
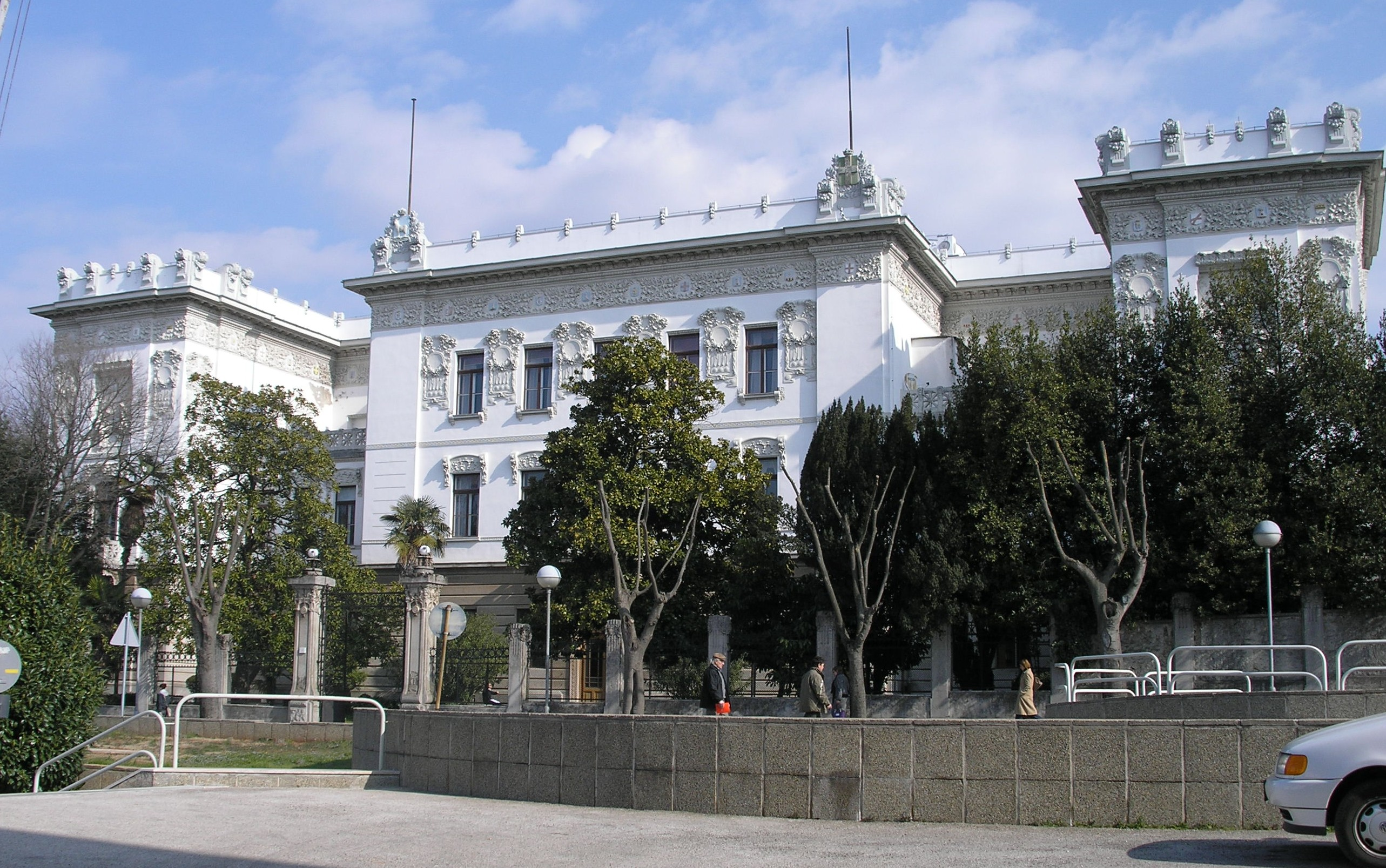
- Main building of the Faculty of Philosophy at the University of Pula
- Latin: Universitas studiorum Polensis Georgii Dobrila
- Other name: UNIPU
- Type: Public
- Established: 21 December 2006
- Affiliations: AARC; DRC; EPUF; IAU; Téthys
- Budget: €10.7 million (2024)
- Rector: Marinko Škare
- Academic staff: 368 (2024)
- Students: 3,070 (2023)
- Undergraduates: 3,007 (2023)
- Postgraduates: 41 (2023)
- Doctoral students: 12 (2023)
- Other students: 10 (2023)^{a}
- Location: Pula, Istria, Croatia; 44°52′02″N 13°51′15″E
- Campus: urban: I – former Civic Hospital, 3.0 ha (7.4 acres) II – former Naval Hospital, 5.0 ha (12 acres)
- Colours: Gold and silver
- Website: unipu.hr

- Location in Croatia

Juraj Dobrila University of Pula (Croatian: Sveučilište Jurja Dobrile u Puli), public university located in Pula, Croatia, established in 2006.

== History ==
Among the first institutions of higher education in Istria were the Higher School of Economics and the Pedagogical Academy in Pula.

The Pula Higher School of Economics was founded in 1960 at the initiative of Mijo Mirković. From this school emerged Dr. Mijo Mirković Faculty of Economics and Tourism.

The person most responsible for the founding of the Pedagogical Academy of Pula was Tone Peruško. It later developed into two institutions: the Faculty of Philosophy and the Higher Teacher Training School.

In the second half of the 20th century, the development of these institutions led to the establishment of the university.

The university was officially founded on 29 September 2006, when the Croatian Parliament passed the Law on the Establishment of the University of Pula, and it was registered on 21 December 2006 at the Commercial Court of Pazin.

The University of Pula is a regionally oriented and integrated university.

== Constituent units ==
Today, the university consists of seven faculties and one art academy:

- Dr. Mijo Mirković Faculty of Economics and Tourism
- Faculty of Informatics
- Faculty of Natural Sciences
- Faculty of Educational Sciences
- Faculty of Philosophy
- Faculty of Medicine
- Faculty of Engineering
- Academy of Music

Other constituent units of the university include:

- Centre for Cultural and Historical Research of Socialism
- Centre for Competence in Education
- Pula Student Centre
- Pula University Library
- University Computing and Information Centre
- Centre for Educational, Research Digital Technology and Digital Education
- Evolve Uni Tech Ltd.

== Rectors ==
A list of rectors of the University of Pula is provided in chronological order:

- Marčelo Dujanić (2006–09)
- Robert Matijašić (2009–13)
- Alfio Barbieri (2013–21)
- Marinko Škare (since 2021)

== See also ==
- Pula
- Istria
