= Drago Gervais =

Croatian poet and playwright

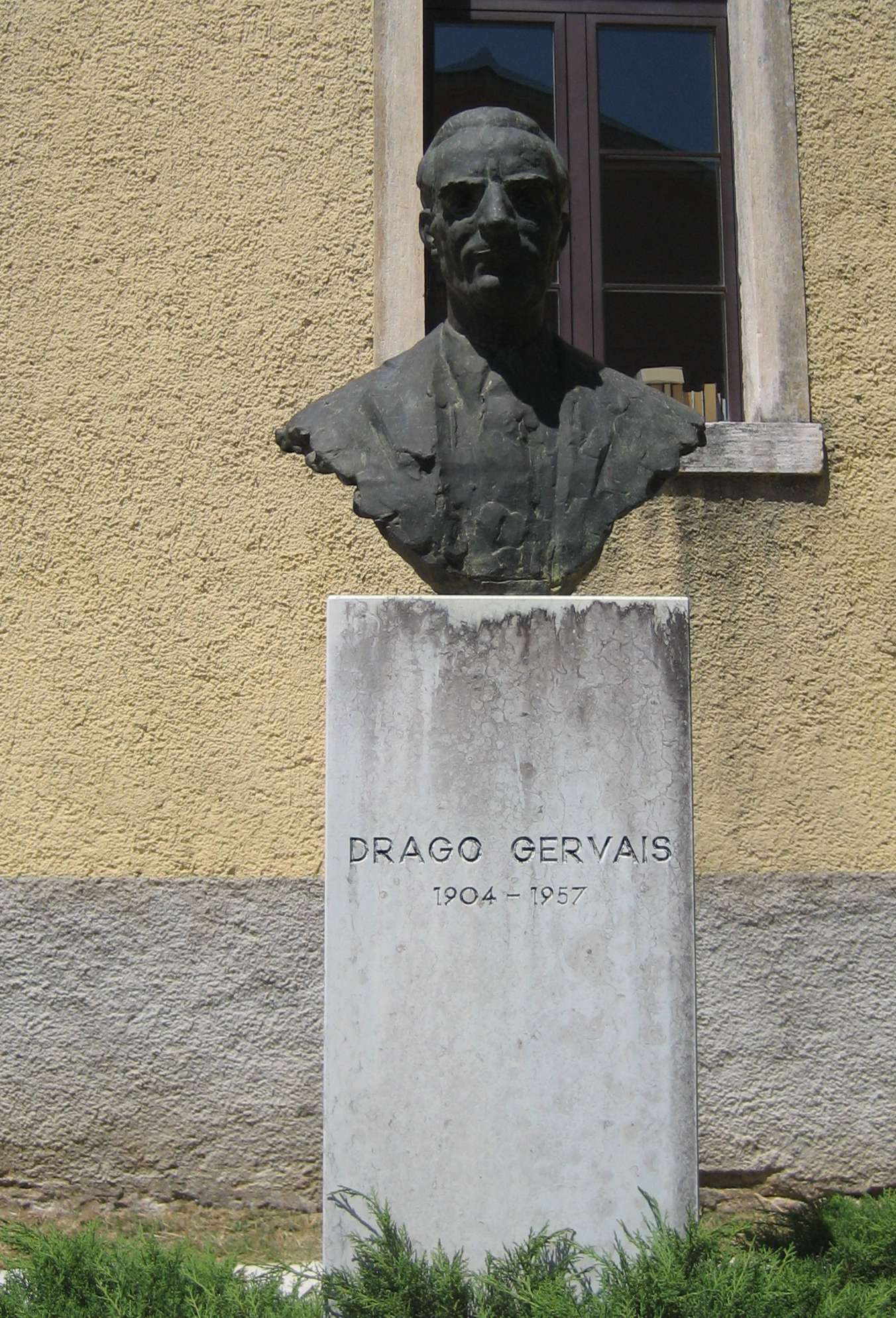
Monument of Drago Gervais in Žminj

Drago Gervais (April 18, 1904 – July 3, 1957) was a Croatian Istrian poet and playwright, and one of the most prominent poets writing in the Chakavian dialect of Croatian.

Drago Gervais was born in 1904 in Opatija. His father Artur, a descendant of a French soldier in Napoleon's army, was a music teacher born in Severin na Kupi in the Gorski Kotar region of Croatia, then part of the Austro-Hungarian Empire. His mother Klementina was from Opatija. In 1918 during the Italian annexation of Istria, he moved with his family to Bakar. In 1922 he graduated from high school in Sušak and attended Zagreb Law School. During his studies he started to collaborate with the Triestine magazine Naš Glas, in which his first two poems, Iz Improvizacija and Mi, were published. Soon after graduating he moved to Crikvenica where he worked at a local law firm. The next year he published his first collection of poems Čakavski stihovi. Later he worked in Bjelovar and Belgrade during the Second World War.

In Belgrade he eventually worked for the Yugoslavian state news agency, Tanjug, and the Ministry of Foreign Affairs, but soon returned to Rijeka where he became the director of Rijeka's Croatian National Theater. He worked there until he fell from a balcony in Sežana at the age of 53.

He was included with Mate Balota in the edition Five Centuries of Croatian Literature, published posthumously in 1973.

== Collection of poems ==
- Čakavski stihovi (1929)
- Istarski katun (1951)

== Comedies ==
- Radi se o stanu (1951)
- Karolina Riječka (1952)
- Duhi (1953)
- Reakcionari
- Brod je otplovio
- Čudo od djevice Ivane
- Palmin List
- Ujak iz Amerike

== Filmography ==
- Barba Žvane (1949)
