= Drago Štambuk =

Croatian physician, writer, and diplomat (born 1950)

Drago Štambuk (20 September 1950) is a Croatian physician, poet, essayist and an ambassador.

Štambuk was born in Selca on the island of Brač. He attended the gymnasium in Split, and the University of Zagreb School of Medicine.

== Career ==
He specialised in internal medicine, gastroenterology and hepatology in Zagreb, but worked and lived in London since 1983, where he was engaged in research of the diseases of liver and AIDS. At that early stage of awareness of HIV/AIDS, Dr. Štambuk was among the first researchers deeply engaged in trying to understand the now widely known and ubiquitous disease.

After Croatia declared its independence in 1991, he turned to diplomacy. In the sensitive period from 1991 until 1994, he served as the plenipotentiary of the newly independent Croatia to the United Kingdom. Afterwards, he became Croatia's ambassador in India and Sri Lanka (1995–1998), Egypt (1998–2000) and a number of Arab countries. Štambuk was a visiting professor at Harvard University from 2001 to 2002, and became a fellow of the Harvard's Weatherhead Center for International Affairs. Since 2002, he has served as ambassador to Japan and South Korea (2005–2010), from 2011 to Brazil, Colombia and Venezuela and since 2019 to Iran.

== Poetry ==
Štambuk is a popular poet in Croatia, having published more than 70 books of poetry, which have been widely translated, and is regarded one of the leading Croatian contemporary poets. Raymond Carver named him "a real poet". His English books include Incompatible animals (1995), Black wave (2009), And the sea is no more (2011), as well as contributions to the magazine Ploughshares; "Language of dismemberement/Loghat al-tamazzuq" (2000) in Arabic, "El viento de las estrellas oscuras"(2003) in Spanish with the foreword by Antonio Skármeta, "Pierre Nocturne" (2009) in French with a foreword by Guillaume Métayer, "Black wave/Kuroi nami" (2009) and "From nowhere/Museki yori" (2011) in English and Japanese, "Céu no poço" (2014), "Criação inacabada do mundo" (2015) and "O mar não está mais" (2016) in Portuguese; "Historia" (foreword Alfredo Perez Alencart), Trilce Ediciones, Salamanca, 2018; "El ruiseñor y la fortaleza" (foreword and translation Carmen Vrljicak), Krivodolpress, Buenos Aires, 2018. in Spanish. He has been granted many international and national literary, arts and peace awards. in 2024 Drago Stambuk invited Reza Fekri, Iranian Opera singer to sing in his poem festival in Reza Fekri composed a new composition on Drago Štambuk's poem.

== Honors ==
- Order of the Rising Sun, 2nd Class, Gold and Silver Star (2019)
