= Ndue Ukaj =

Albanian author

Ndue Ukaj^{[a]} is an Albanian writer, publicist, and literary critic.

== Biography ==
Ndue Ukaj studied literature at the University of Pristina.

Ukaj was born in Kosovo. He has published six poetry collections, two volumes of short stories, a novel, and two books of literary criticism. His writing has earned multiple awards, including the National Award for the Best Book of Poetry published in 2010 in Kosovo, the Award for Best Poem at the International Poetry Festival for Days of Naim in North Macedonia (2011), and the Best Writer Award at the book fair Libri të bân mirë in Shkodra, Albania (2025).

== Works ==
=== Books in Albanian ===
- Mund të jetë si në fillimet e kohëve, poetry, Onufri, 2025
- Shtegu i të verbërve, short stories, Onufri, 2024
- Dritarja e Marin Shkrelit, novel, Onufri, 2023
- Retë prej drite, poetry, Onufri, 2022
- Mbretëria e ëndrrave, tregime, Onufri, 2021
- Ismail Kadare: Kryqëzime letrare dhe kulturore, essays, Onufri, 2019
- Krijimi i dashurisë, poetic selection, Tetovë, 2017
- Gjithmonë diçka mungon, poetry, OM, Prishtinë, 2017
- Arka e shpëtimit, poetry, "Drita", Prishtinë, 2012
- Godo nuk vjen, poetry in Albanian, English, and Spanish, translated by Peter Tases, published by Lulu Enterprises
- Ujëvarat e metaforave, poetry, Tiranë, Botimet M&B, 2008
- Diskursi biblik në letërsinë shqipe, study, Prishtinë, AIKD, 2004

=== Books in English ===
- Ithaca of the Word, translated by Peter Tase, Lulu Enterprises, USA, 2010
- Godo is Not Coming, translated by Peter Tase, Lulu Enterprises, USA, 2010

=== Book in Spanish ===
- Godo no viene, translated by Peter Tase, Lulu Enterprises, USA, 2010.

=== Anthologies ===
- Various authors (2023). Jarquín, Carlos Javier (ed.). Canto planetario: hermandad en la Tierra. Costa Rica: HC Editores. ISBN 979-8850092115.
