= Krystyna Lenkowska =

Polish poet and translator

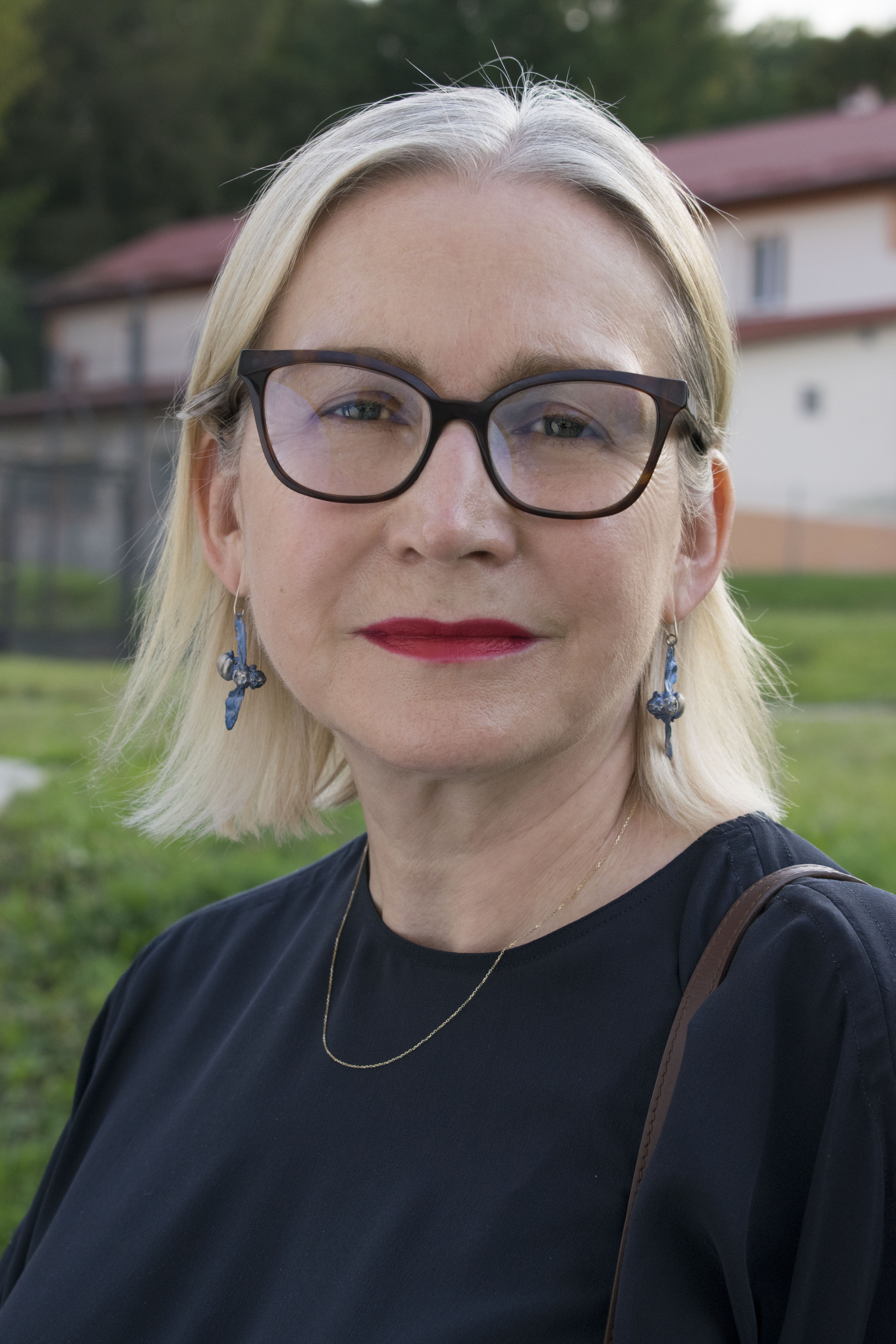

Krystyna Lenkowska (born 1957) is a Polish poet and translator. She has been included in the representative anthology of Polish women poets Scattering the Dark (White Pine Press 2016, Buffalo-New York). Her translation of poems by Emily Dickinson, the Brontës, Michael Ondaatje, Anne Carson, Ruth Padel, Dana Gioia have been published in the literary Polish journals and books. She lives in Rzeszów.

== Career as a writer ==
Her poems, fragments of prose, translations, essays, notes and interviews have been published in literary magazines in Poland including: Akcent, Fraza, Nowa Okolica Poetów, Odra, Pobocza, Pracownia, Przekrój, Topos, Twórczość, Tygiel, Wyspa, Zeszyty Literackie, and Znad Wilii. In the US, in Ewa Hryniewicz-Yarbrough’s translation, some of her poems have appeared in Absinthe, Boulevard, Chelsea, Confrontation, The Normal School, and Spoon River Poetry Review. In Ukraine her poems have been published in the translation by Wasyl Machno, Evgen Baran’s, Oleksander Gordon and Natalia Belczenko. Her poems have also appeared in Albania, Bosnia and Herzegovina, Czech Republic, India, Israel, Lithuania, Macedonia, Mexico, Mongolia, Romania, Slovakia, and Taiwan. The poem "The Eye of John Keats in Rome" received the first prize at the international competition in Sarajevo "Seeking ~~for~~ a Poem" for the year 2012. In 2013, the poet received the second prize “Menada” at the international festival of poetry DITET E NAIMIT (XVII edition in Macedonia and Albania). In 2019 in Bhubaneswar, India she was awarded 3rd place in the 39th World Congress of Poets.

== Music lyrics ==
Lenkowska is the author of lyrics recorded by Beata Czernecka from “Piwnica pod Baranami”, Bożena Boba-Dyga, Zbigniew Działa (RSC) and Paweł Czachur (Ratatam).

== Associations ==
She is a member of Association of Polish Writers (SPP), Polish Literary Translators Association (STL), and ZAiKS.

== Poetry in Polish ==
- 1991 Walc Prowincja / Rzeszów
- 2002 Pochodnio, Różo / Nowy Świat, Warsaw
- 2003 Wiersze okienne / Podkarpacki Instytut Książki, Rzeszów
- 2008 Sztuka Białego / Instytut Wydawniczy Erica, Warsaw
- 2010 Tato i inne miejsca / Miniatura, Kraków
- 2013 Kry i wyspy / Mitel, Rzeszów
- 2020 Kiedy byłam rybą (lub ptakiem) / Biblioteka Stowarzyszenia Pisarzy Polskich, Kraków
- 2021 Balkon / Fundacja Słowo i Obraz, Augustów

== Bilingual poetry ==
- 1999 Keep off the Primroses / Nie deptać przylaszczek, translation into English: Krystyna Lenkowska / YES, Rzeszów
- 2005 Eve's Choice / Wybór Ewy / Polski Instytut Wydawniczy, Warsaw, translation into English: Ewa Hryniewicz-Yarbrough
- 2014 Zaległy list do pryszczatego anioła / An Overdue Letter to a Pimply Angel / Mitel, Rzeszów, translation into English: Ewa Hryniewicz-Yarbrough
- 2014 Турбота / Lviv, translation into Ukrainian: Oleksander Gordon
- 2017 Fragment de dialogue, translation into French: I’sabelle Macor / L’Harmattan, Paris
- 2017 Carte Orange, translation into French: Tomasz Wojewoda / Eperons-Ostrogi, Kraków
- 2023 Él el mar / Ono morze, translation into Spanish: Xavier Farré / Podkarpacki Instytut Książki
- 2026 Decompression / Dekompresja, translation into English: Krystyna Lenkowska, Nasim Luczaj, Cecilia Woloch, Sarah Luczaj / FRAZA Rzeszów

== Prose ==
- 2016 Babeliada / FRAZA, Rzeszów

== Translation ==
- 2018 Jest pewien ukos światła Emily Dickinson, tłumaczenie i wstęp: Krystyna Lenkowska / Officyna, Łódź
- 2021 Emily Dickinson, Wybór poezji / Biblioteka Narodowa

== Audiobook ==
- 2014 I nic się nie stało / Wojewódzka i Miejska Biblioteka Publiczna w Rzeszowie
- 2018 Babeliada / Wojewódzka i Miejska Biblioteka Publiczna w Rzeszowie
