= Subotica Law School =

- Правни факултет у Суботици
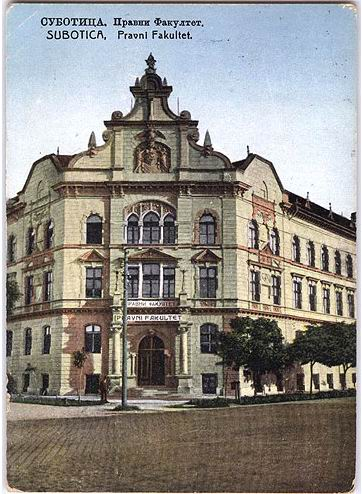
- Type: Public
- Active: 1920–1941
- Affiliations: University of Belgrade
- Students: 496
- Location: Subotica, Kingdom of Yugoslavia
- Campus: Urban

The University of Belgrade School of Law at Subotica (Serbian: Правни факултет у Суботици - Универзитет у Београду / Pravni fakultet u Subotici - Univerzitet u Beogradu) was an institution providing legal education in Subotica, Kingdom of Yugoslavia from 1920 to 1941.

== History ==
After the end of World War I and the creation of the Kingdom of Serbs, Croats and Slovenes, the University of Belgrade reopened in the academic year 1919/1920. The Ministry of Education gave the University of Belgrade the resources to establish a law school in Subotica.

In academic year 1921/1922, 496 students enrolled the Law School - 124 from central Serbia, 103 from Montenegro, 89 from Vojvodina, 53 from southern Serbia and Macedonia, 21 from Srem, 4 from Bosnia and Herzegovina, 14 from Dalmatia, 4 from Boka Kotorska, 10 from Croatia and Slavonia, 1 from Slovenia, 3 from Zadar, 2 from Istria, 53 from Russia, 1 from Czechoslovakia, 7 from Romania and 1 from Greece. 12 of the students were females.

The professors were from Serbia and Croatia, and some of them were from Istria, which belonged to Italy at that time. As Yugoslavia accepted a large number of educated Russian refugees, several Russian scholars accepted to work at the Subotica Law School, such as Demčenko, Smirnov, Čubinski, Troicki, Struve, Koršunov and Taranovski.

Students have established associations and academic clubs, such as "Debate Club", "Vojvodina", "Friends of France", "Academic Adriatic Guard", and others.

== Closing ==
The Subotica Law School existed until April 1, 1941. When World War II started, the building was occupied by the military. The inventory was looted, the school was closed, and it never reopened again.
