= Rakalj =

Rakalj Castelnuovo d'Arsa
- Village
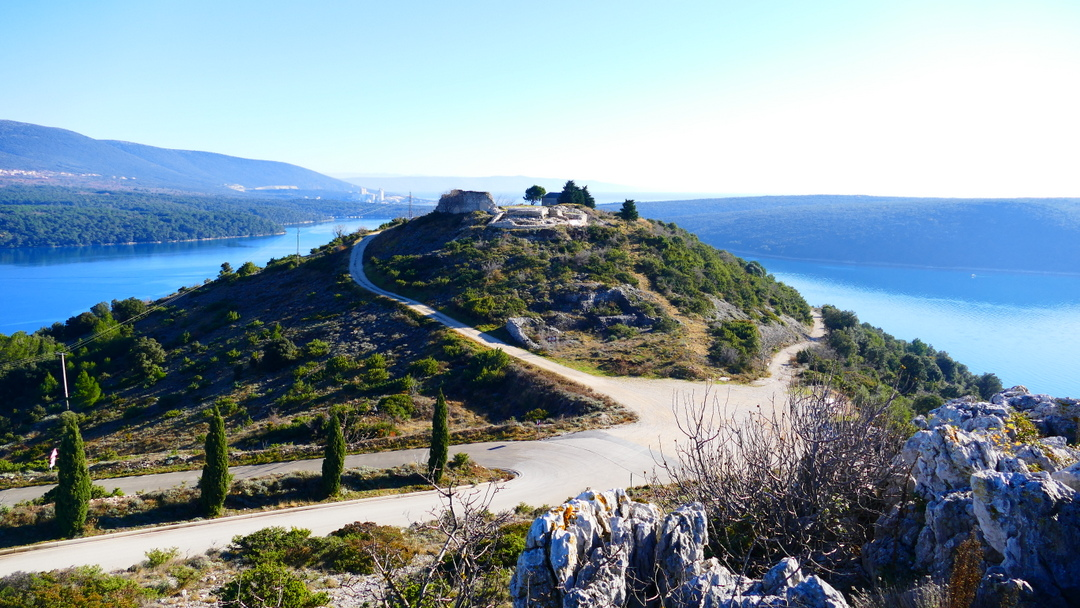

- Location within Croatia
- Country: Croatia
- County: Istria County
- Municipality: Marčana

Area
  - Total: 5.4 sq mi (14.1 km^{2})

Population (2021)
  - Total: 393
  - Density: 72.2/sq mi (27.9/km^{2})
- Time zone: UTC+1 (CET)
  - Summer (DST): UTC+2 (CEST)
- Area code: 052

Rakalj (Italian: Castelnuovo d'Arsa) is a village in Croatia. It is part of the municipality of Marčana in Istria County.

== Culture ==
Rakalj is home to a Chair of the Chakavian Parliament.

== History ==
The old part of the town of Rakalj is closer to the sea, and is mostly uninhabited today. In this part are the ruins of the former castle and the church of Svete Agneze (Agnjije) ("St. Agnes"), dating to the end of the 15th century. The church is located on a hill with a beautiful sea view. It has a rectangular ground plan, an inscribed apse, and a transept and Gothic portal with a date (1495) carved therein on the front. On the church tabernacle there is the inscription Anno Domini MCCCCXXV die XXV Dec. Master Dominicus fecit. According to a 1555 document it was once a parish church. The tabernacle of the church (and the inscription) might be the work of Domenico da Capodistria.

Sunday Holy Masses are not held at St. Agnes, but there are a few days in the year when St. Mass, traditionally, is held in this church. People also come to the church to get married, both from the surrounding smaller towns and larger cities. Remains of a prehistoric hillfort were found at the place where the medieval castle was built, and later there was an ancient fortress. The castle itself, whose remains can still be seen today, was probably built at the beginning of the 11th century. The old castle is located east of today's settlement, above the promontory of Sv. Nikola, at over 90 meters above sea level. The castle was mentioned in a 1312 document as Castellare de Rachir. In the town of Rakalj there are still present the ruins of the defensive walls and towers. After several changes of rulers, in 1536 Rakalj was sold as a fief to the Loredan family together with Barban. Today's Rakalj is mentioned in sources in 1342 as Castrum Novum.

The parish church Rođenja Blažene Djevice Marije ("Nativity of the Blessed Virgin Mary") was built in the 15th century, as a rectangular building with an elevated sanctuary, without an apse. The apse, together with side chapels, was added later, in the mid-18th century. On the way to nearby Krnica there are the ruins of the church of sv. Teodora ("Saint Theodora").

The inhabitants engage in traditional agriculture, farming, and quarrying in the nearby quarries. Some are also employed in larger Istrian towns and cities, such as Pula. The town was once known for making traditional Istrian pottery.

Today, tourism is beginning to develop Rakalj.

== Demographics ==
According to the 2021 census, its population was 393. In 2001, it was 487.

== Notable people ==
- Mate Balota, poet
- Lidija Percan, singer

== Bibliography ==
- Danilo Klen, Arhivske vijesti o nekim kulturnim spomenicima Barbana i Raklja, Bulletin of the Institute of Fine Arts JAZU, 1964, 3;
- Luigi Foscan, I castelli medioevali dell'Istria, Trieste 1992;
- Vladimir Marković, Crkve XVII. i XVIII. st. u Istri – tipologija i stil, Zagreb 2004
