= Faculty of Economics and Business, University of Zagreb =

Croatian university department

Faculty of Economics & Business
- Ekonomski Fakultet u Zagrebu
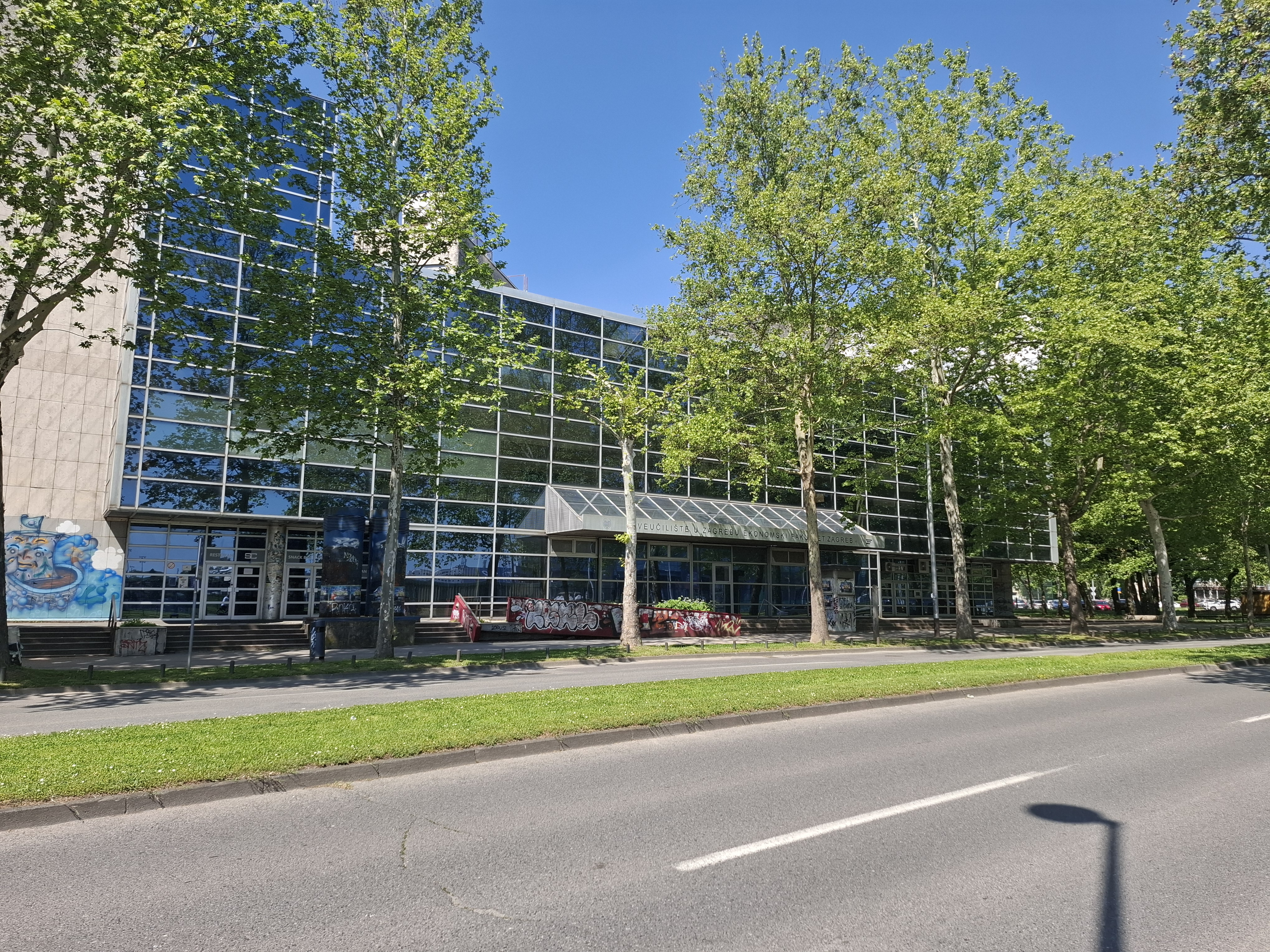
- Location of the faculty in Borongaj
- Type: Public business school
- Established: 1920; 106 years ago
- Parent institution: University of Zagreb
- Dean: Professor Sanja Sever Mališ, PhD
- Faculty: 260 (2018)
- Administrative staff: 115 (2018)
- Students: 8,500+
- Location: Zagreb, Croatia
- Campus: Urban
- Colors
- Website: efzg.unizg.hr/en

Faculty of Economics and Business, University of Zagreb (Croatian: Ekonomski fakultet Sveučilišta u Zagrebu; Ekonomski fakultet - Zagreb) is a public-owned faculty (business school) of the University of Zagreb.

It was established in 1920, when the College of Commerce and Transport was founded. The name Faculty of Economics and Business was given in 1947. Throughout history, the locations and names of the Faculty have been changed.

== History ==
Faculty of Economics & Business was founded on June 17, 1920, as Higher School of Commerce and Transport with the mission of providing education in the areas of banking, home and international trade, transport, consular service, and insurance. The program lasted three years. In the academic year 1923/24 it had 1,125 students. In 1925, by the efforts of the then Minister of Education Stjepan Radić, it grew into the Higher School of Economics and Commerce with legal standing of the university faculty school. The program was extended to four years, while the school also gained authorization to conduct the nostrification processes for doctorates in economic and commercial studies.

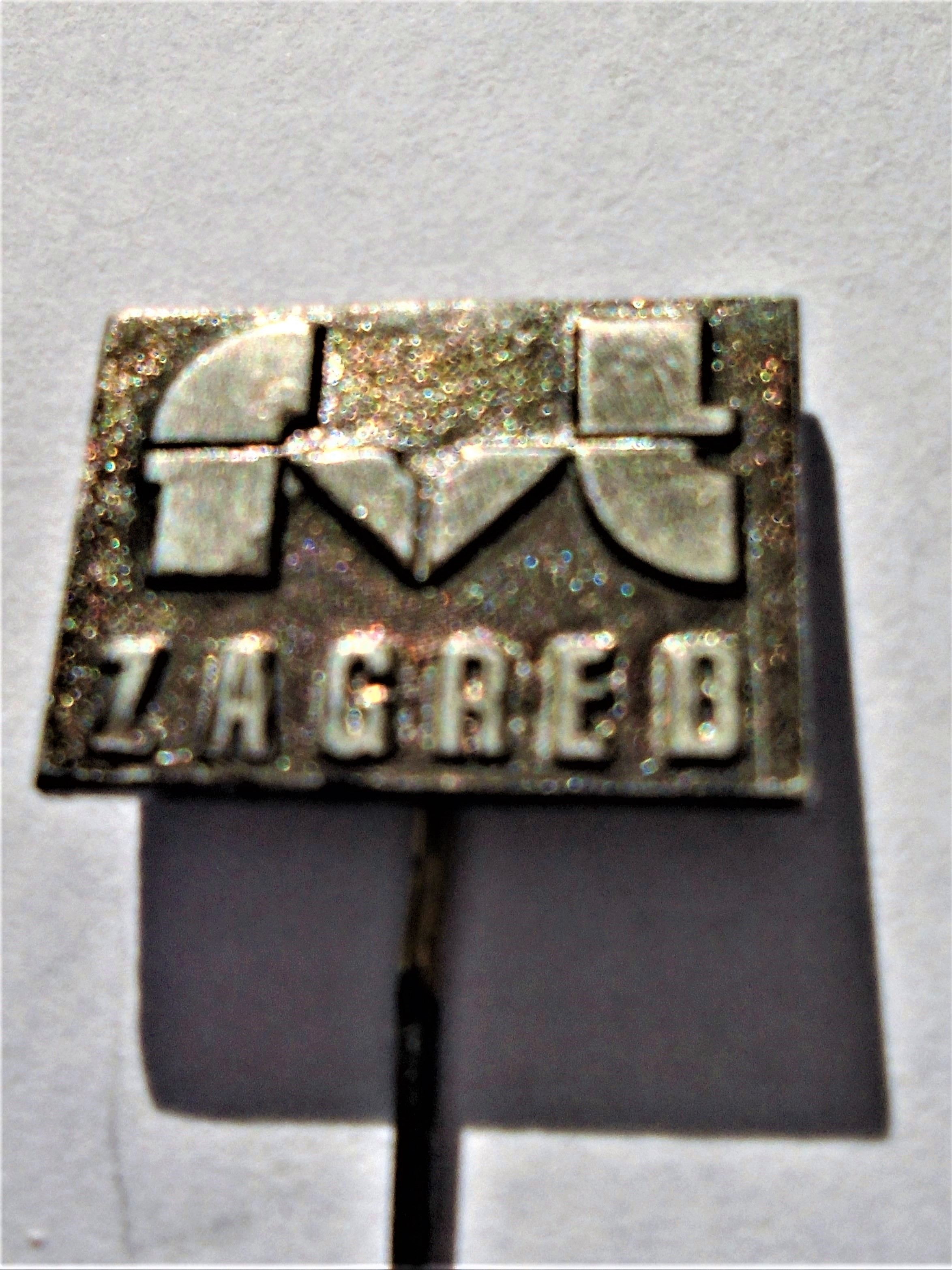
Old metal pin badge of the former Faculty of Foreign Trade (fvt)

In 1947, it was transformed into the Faculty of Economics and in 1968 merged with School of Business (founded in 1956; offered a two-year program with a curriculum adjusted to the needs of the working students) into the Faculty of Economic Sciences, which was then in 1982 merged with the Faculty of Foreign Trade into the present-day Faculty of Economics.

== Organisation ==
Faculty is divided into 17 academic departments: Demography, Economic Theory, Business Economics, Informatics, Finance, Macroeconomics and Economic Development, Marketing, Mathematics, International Economics, Organisation and Management, Law, Accounting, Statistics, Trade and International Business, Tourism, Business Languages, and Physical Education.

Beside academic departments, Faculty has 11 organisational units for administrative and technical staff.

== Dean's Office ==
The management board of the Faculty of Economics & Business has five members:

1. Prof. Sanja Sever Mališ, Ph.D., Dean
2. Assoc. Prof. Zoran Wittine, Ph.D., Vice Dean for Infrastructure and Business Processes
3. Assoc. Prof. Ljubica Milanović, Ph.D., Vice Dean for Study Programs, Communication and Digitalization
4. Assoc. Prof. Nikolina Dečman, Ph.D., Vice Dean for Business, Protocol and Organization
5. Assoc. Prof. Jakša Krišto, Ph.D., Vice Dean for Students, Lectures and Economic Cooperation
6. Prof. Zoran Krupka, Ph.D., Vice Dean for Quality , Internationalization and Science

Dean Elect for the upcoming 2024/2025, 2025/2026 and 2026/2027 academic years is Prof. Sanja Sever Mališ.

== Study Programs ==
The Faculty offers following degree programs:

Taught in Croatian:

- University Integrated Bachelor's and Master's degree in Business study program (5-years; 300 ECTS)
- University Integrated Bachelor's and Master's degree in Economics study program (5-years; 300 ECTS)
- University degree Specialist Postgraduate study program in various fields of Business and Economics (1-year or 1.5-year; 60 or 90 ECTS)
- University Doctor's degree study program in Economics and Business (3-years; 180 ECTS)
- University Doctor's degree study program in Economics and Global Security (3-years; 180 ECTS)
- Professional undergraduate study program in Business with majors: Accounting and Finance, Tourism Business Operations, and Commerce Business operations (3-years; 180 ECTS)
- Professional graduate study program in Economics of Entrepreneurship, Economics of Energy and Environment, E-business in Private and Public Sector, Management and Marketing of Retail, and Digital Marketing (2-years; 120 ECTS)

Taught in English:

- University Bachelor's degree in Business study program (4-years; 240 ECTS)
- University Master's degree in Business study program with majors: Managerial Informatics, Management, and Trade and International Business (1-year; 60 ECTS)
- University Bachelor's degree in Economics study program (4-years; 240 ECTS)
- University Master's degree in Economics study program (1-year; 60 ECTS)

Between 1920 and 2019, more than 85,000 students graduated from the Faculty.

== Journals ==
Faculty has intensive publishing activity, whether it is for the publication of journals, conference proceedings or textbooks for teaching purposes in Croatia and the surrounding area. The Faculty publishes several internationally recognized scientific journals:

- Acta Turistica (indexed in WoS, Scopus and other databases)
- INTEREULAWEA§T (indexed in SCOPUS and other databases)
- Business Excellence (indexed in EconLit and other databases)
- Market-Tržište (indexed in WoS, Scopus and other bases)
- Zagreb International Review of Economics and Business (ZIREB) (indexed in WoS and other databases)
- Proceedings of the Faculty of Economics and Business in Zagreb (indexed in EconLit and other databases)

== International Accreditation ==
Faculty holds two international accreditations - EPAS accreditation for University bachelor's degree study program in Business, and AACSB Business accreditation.

Faculty is the first faculty within the University of Zagreb to have a Certificate of quality management system according to the international standard ISO 9001: 2015.

=== EPAS Accreditation ===
In 2006, the Faculty developed a 4-year University bachelor's degree in Business (BDiB) study program, for Croatian as well as international students. In order to reach better position in the Southeast Europe, in 2008, a strategic decision was made to accredit the study program in English with the international European Program Accreditation System (EPAS) offered by EFMD. The school obtained accreditation on February 9, 2011, as well as two re-accreditations: February 19, 2014 and February 15, 2017.

=== AACSB Business Accreditation ===
The Faculty was accredited by the AACSB in July 2019.

== Facilities and student life ==
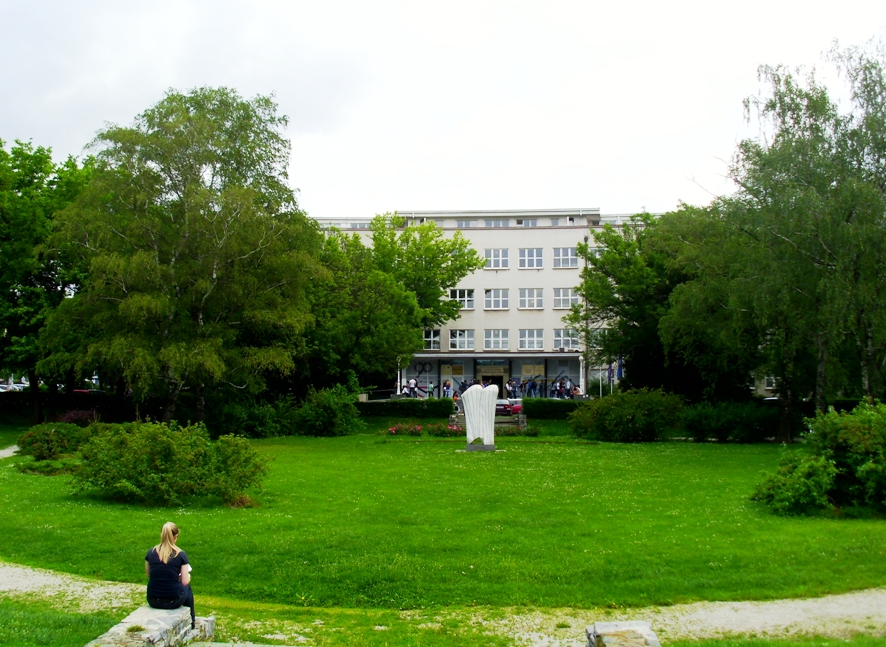
Faculty's main building as viewed from its park

Faculty is located at the John F. Kennedy Square in Zagreb. Its building become operational in academic year 1952/1953. With a renovation in 1987. Since November 2011, classes for the associate degree programs have been held in the new facility within the Scientific and University Campus Borongaj. The Faculty has 52 lecture halls with 4,021 seats, two teleconference halls, a library, sports facilities, and cafeteria.

With more than 10,000 students, it is by far the Facility in the country. The Statute of the Faculty gives students the right to set up professional, sports and other non-political and non-profit clubs and student organizations. Currently, there are 12 active students associations registered within the Faculty. In addition, Faculty publishes 6 scientific journals.
