= Visintini =

Visintini is an Italian surname from Friuli-Venezia Giulia, derived from Venetian vixentin or Friulian visintin ('from Vicenza'), or from the Istrian town of Vižintini (present-day Croatia). Notable people with the surname include:

- Jorge Visintini (born 1988), Argentine footballer
- Licio Visintini (1915–1942), Italian naval officer
- Mario Visintini (1913–1941), Italian military aircraft pilot

== See also ==
- Vicentini
- Visintin
- Visentin
- Visentini
