= The Silent Enemy (1958 film) =

1958 British action film by William Fairchild

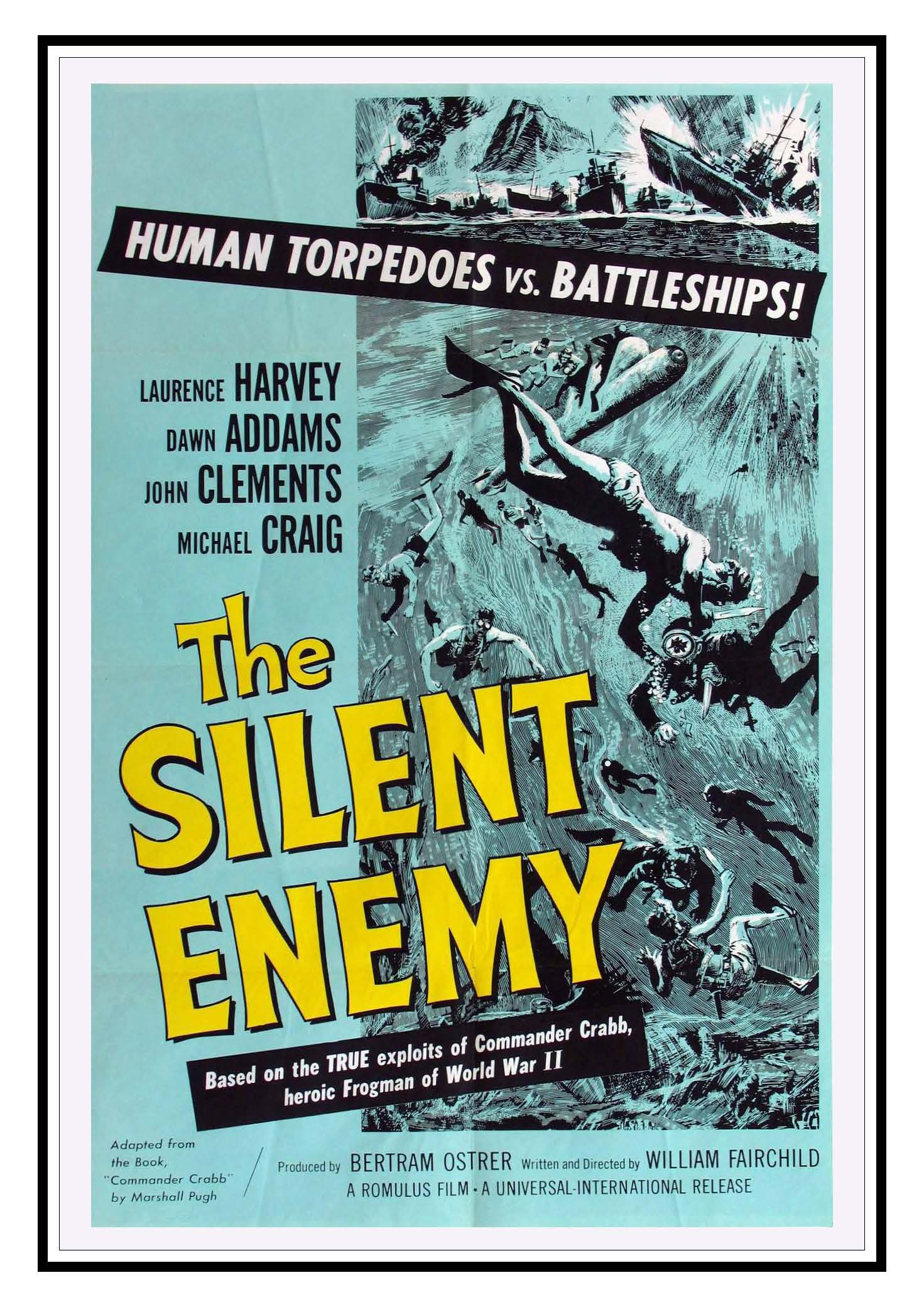
- Original US release film poster by Reynold Brown
- Directed by: William Fairchild
- Screenplay by: William Fairchild
- Based on: Commander Crabb by Marshall Pugh
- Produced by: Bertram Ostrer; Raymond Anzarut
- Starring: Laurence Harvey; Dawn Addams; John Clements; Michael Craig; Sid James
- Cinematography: Otto Heller
- Edited by: Alan Osbiston
- Music by: William Alwyn
- Production company: Romulus Films
- Distributed by: Universal-International
- Release date: 4 March 1958
- Running time: 112 minutes
- Country: United Kingdom
- Language: English

The Silent Enemy is a black and white 1958 British action film, directed by William Fairchild and starring Laurence Harvey, Dawn Addams, Michael Craig and John Clements. Based on Marshall Pugh's 1956 book Commander Crabb, the film follows the publicity created by Lionel Crabb's mysterious disappearance and likely death during a Cold War incident two years earlier (April 1956).The film depicts events in Gibraltar harbour during the World War II Italian frogman and manned torpedo attacks, although the film's depiction of the events is highly fictionalised. It was the first Universal Pictures film in SuperScope.

Enlisted men refer to Crabb as "Crabbie" throughout, alluding to his crabby nature.

== Plot ==
During the 1941 Italian manned torpedo raid on Alexandria, two British battleships, HMS Queen Elizabeth and HMS Valiant, are severely damaged. The British are worried that this new tactic will afford the Italians naval supremacy in the Mediterranean and the ability to strike their primary target, the Royal Navy base at Gibraltar.

To counter this threat, bomb-disposal expert Lionel Crabb is posted to Gibraltar. He organises a small team of divers to intercept the Italian attacks and defuse the bombs. Meanwhile, from Algeciras in neutral Spain, Italian expert on underwater operations Antonio Tomolino is secretly watching the British base in Gibraltar and planning new attacks.

After the Italians mount a failed attack upon a cruiser in Gibraltar, Crabb and his divers recover one of the manned torpedoes and begin to repair it. Chief Petty Officer Thorpe takes command of physical and diving training.

After a further series of attacks against ships in Gibraltar harbour and an attempt to recover secret documents from a wrecked aircraft, Crabb visits Algeciras to discover the Italians' base of operations. After following a man with an Italian tattoo to the interned Italian ship the Olterra, he discovers that the ship's hold is being used as a workshop and base for the operations. The ship's underwater door is used for the manned torpedoes and by frogmen, which leaves them undiscovered by Spanish authorities. Crabb reports the discovery of the Olterra to his superiors, but under the laws of neutrality, he cannot arrange an attack without top-level authority.

Meanwhile, the Italians plan a major attack on a British convoy. Crabb ignores orders and, with the manned torpedo repaired, he and another diver infiltrate the docks at Algeciras, launching a preemptive strike on the Olterra that destroys the ship, workshop and crew.

The next morning, with the convoy leaving Gibraltar, Thorpe informs Crabb that for his bravery in this operation he has been awarded the George Medal, commenting to his men: "You all deserve a ruddy medal!"

== Cast ==
- Laurence Harvey as Lieutenant Lionel Crabb, R.N.V.R.
- Dawn Addams as Third Officer Jill Masters, W.R.N.S.
- Michael Craig as Leading Seaman Sydney Knowles
- John Clements as the Admiral
- Sid James as Chief Petty Officer Thorpe (credited as Sidney James)
- Alec McCowen as Able Seaman Morgan
- Nigel Stock as Able Seaman Fraser
- Ian Whittaker as Ordinary Seaman Thomas
- Arnoldo Foà as Tomolino
- Gianna Maria Canale as Conchita
- Massimo Serato as Forzellini
- Giacomo Rossi-Stuart as Rosati
- Carlo Giustini as Fellini
- Raymond Young as Celloni
- David Lodge as Sergeant
- Ewen Solon as Willowdale Captain
- Brian Oulton as Holford
- Howard Marion-Crawford as Wing Commander
- Cyril Shaps as Miguel
- Lee Montague as Miguel's mate
- John Lee as Flag Lieutenant
- Terence Longdon as Lieutenant Bailey
- Ian MacNaughton as sentry outside Admiral's Office
- David Fotheringham as Italian frogman
- Alan Webb as British Consul
- John Moffatt as diving volunteer
- Harold Siddons as army interrogation officer
- Derren Nesbitt as Patrol Boat officer
- Michael Brill as Naval Interrogation officer

== Production ==
The film was announced in June 1957. Filming took place in England, Malta and Gibraltar. Star Laurence Harvey regularly worked for Romulus Films, who produced the movie.

Harvey was injured in the leg and hospitalised during filming in Malta.

Michael Craig had been suspended by the Rank Organisation for refusing the lead in The Gypsy and the Gentleman (1958) but was removed from the project after James Woolf of Romulus Films offered Craig's annual salary to Rank. Craig said that Laurence Harvey "was good company, generous to his friends and, in spite of his reputation as a user, I liked him a lot."

== Critical reception ==
The Monthly Film Bulletin wrote: "Free of jingoism and high-flown heroics, The Silent Enemy is more perceptive than most comparable war melodramas, allowing that war is a tragedy which affects both sides. The enemy are shown not as fanatics or political extremists, but simply as men with an irksome job to do. Unfortunately the film fails to present a particularly convincing or authentic picture of Crabb; the main role is played with boyish earnestness and stereotyped heroic style by a bearded Laurence Harvey. Otherwise the film is competent, interesting, often exciting. The underwater scenes, beautifully photographed by Egil Woxholt, forcefully recreate the gloomy, claustrophobic atmosphere of the Mediterranean depths."

The Radio Times Guide to Films gave the film 3/5 stars, writing: "This distinguished British war film celebrates the exploits of celebrated Royal Navy frogman Lt Lionel "Buster" Crabb, played here by Laurence Harvey, whose explosive temperament is a perfect match for the volatile character he plays. The underwater shooting is well done, and the plot has more excitement than many fictional tales. The saga is shot through with a rich vein of humour, a credit to writer/director William Fairchild."

In British Sound Films: The Studio Years 1928–1959 David Quinlan rated the film as "good", writing: "Undemanding war film with excitement and a vein of humour."

British film critic Leslie Halliwell said: "Stereotyped naval; underwater adventures, adequately presented."

== Historical inaccuracies ==
The British divers are shown as using Davis Submerged Escape Apparatus, with the Italians using the British Chariot manned torpedoes rather than Italian Maiale manned torpedoes.

In reality, Crabb spent several months deactivating mines brought ashore by other divers before learning to dive himself.

The real divers did not initially wear fins. Crabb and Knowles were the first to use them after removing them from the Italian chariot divers.

== See also ==
- Films featuring human torpedoes
