= Sydney Knowles =

British naval frogman during and after WWII

Sydney James Knowles
- Born: 3 September 1921; Preston, Lancashire
- Died: 31 July 2012 (aged 90)
- Military career
- Allegiance: United Kingdom
- Branch: Royal Navy
- Service years: 1939–1950
- Units: HMS Zulu; HMS Lookout; Underwater Working Party
- Conflicts: World War II • Battle of the Atlantic • Operation Pedestal
- Awards: British Empire Medal

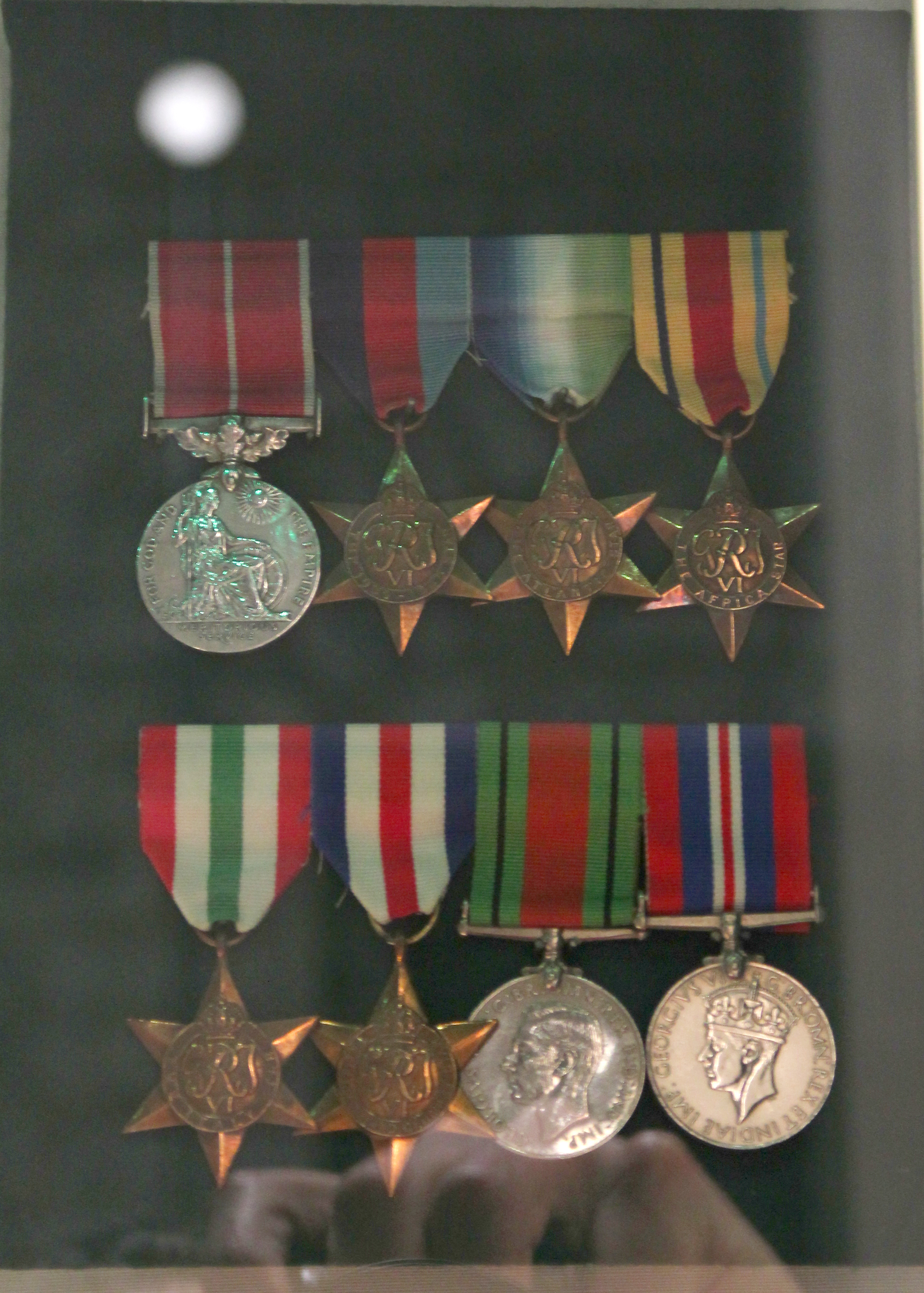
Medals awarded to Sydney Knowles.

Sydney Knowles, BEM, (3 September 1921 – 31 July 2012) was a British Royal Navy frogman during and after World War II.

== Biography ==
Knowles was born in Preston, Lancashire, the son of a railwayman. He joined the Navy at the start of World War II and served as a stoker aboard the destroyers Zulu and Lookout, taking part in trans-Atlantic convoys and in Operation Pedestal, the relief of Malta. In 1942 Knowles joined the Underwater Working Party, under Lieutenant Commander Lionel Crabb, at Gibraltar.

Knowles was one of a group of underwater guard divers who checked for limpet mines in Gibraltar Harbour during the period of Italian frogman and manned torpedo attacks. The group dived with Davis Escape Sets, which until then had not been used much if at all for swimming down from the surface. At first they swam by breaststroke without swimfins.

On 17 December 1942, during one such attack, two of the Italian frogmen (Lt. Visintini and Petty Officer Magro) died, probably killed by small explosive charges thrown from harbor-defence patrol boats, a tactic said to have been introduced by Crabb. Their bodies were recovered, and their swimfins were taken and from then on used by Knowles and Crabb.

In July 1943 Knowles took part in the recovery of the body of Free Polish Commander General Władysław Sikorski, after his aircraft crashed off Gibraltar. Later his unit operated in Italy, clearing mines and obstacles, including mines from the Bridge of Sighs in Venice. Knowles left the Navy in 1950, and worked as a self-employed haulier. His last mission before leaving the British Royal Navy was to search for a Spanish Armada galleon in Tobermory Bay on the Isle of Mull.

In 1955 Crabb took Knowles with him to investigate the hull of the Soviet cruiser Sverdlov to evaluate its superior manoeuvrability. According to Knowles, they found a circular opening at the ship's bow and inside it a large propeller that could be directed to give thrust to the bow.

Crabb disappeared after a dive on the Sverdlov's sister ship, Ordzhonikidze in Portsmouth harbour in 1956, but 14 months later a body in a frogman suit was found floating off Pilsey Island. The body was mutilated and identification by relatives proved difficult. Knowles knew that Crabb had two prominent scars on his left leg; having failed to find any scars on the corpse he refused to identify it as Crabb's. An inquest jury returned an open verdict but the coroner announced that he was satisfied that the body was that of Lionel Crabb.

On 26 March 2006, The Mail On Sunday published an article by Tim Binding entitled "Buster Crabb was murdered - by MI5". Binding wrote a fictionalised account of Crabb's life, Man Overboard which was published by Picador in 2005. Binding stated that, following the book's publication, he was contacted by Knowles, who now lived in Málaga, Spain. Binding alleged that he then met Knowles in Spain and was told that Crabb was known by MI5 to have intentions of defecting to the USSR. This would have been embarrassing for the UK — Crabb being an acknowledged war hero. Knowles has suggested that MI5 set up the mission to the Ordzhonikidze specifically to murder Crabb, and supplied Crabb with a new diving partner ordered to kill him. Binding stated that Knowles alleges that he was ordered by MI5 to identify the body found as Crabb, when he knew it was definitely not Crabb. Knowles went along with the deception. Knowles has also alleged that his life was threatened in Torremolinos in 1989, at a time when Knowles was in discussions with a biographer.

Knowles also stated on televised interview on that Crabb did not dive alone on his fatal last mission.

He died in Coín, Spain, on 31 July 2012. He was buried in the English Cemetery in Málaga.

Knowles was played by Michael Craig in the fictionalised 1958 film The Silent Enemy about World War II divers in Gibraltar.

== Publications ==
- A Diver in the Dark. Bognor Regis, West Sussex: Woodfield Publishing Ltd. 2009. ISBN 1-84683-082-6.
