= Vicentini =

Vicentini (pronounced [vitʃenˈtiːni]) is a surname from Northern Italy, originally indicating families from Vicenza. Notable people with the surname include:

- Diego Vicentini (born 1994), Venezuelan filmmaker
- Flaviano Vicentini (1942–2002), Italian cyclist
- Ippolito Vicentini (1638–1702), Italian Roman Catholic prelate
- Juliano Vicentini (born 1981), Brazilian footballer
- Luis Vicentini (1902–1938), Chilean boxer
- Manuel Vicentini (born 1990), Argentine footballer
- Roberto Vicentini (1878–1953), Italian Roman Catholic prelate

== See also ==
- Puerto Vicentini, a village in Argentina
- Vicentino (disambiguation)
- Visentini
- Visintini
