= Vincent (disambiguation) =

Vincent is a masculine given name.

Vincent may also refer to:

== Places ==
=== Australia ===
- Vincent, Queensland, a suburb of Townsville, Australia
- City of Vincent, a local government area of Western Australia

=== United States ===
- Vincent, Alabama, a city
- Vincent, California, a census designated place
- Vincent, Iowa, a city
- Vincent, Kansas, an unincorporated community
- Vincent, Kentucky
- Vincent, Ohio
- Port Vincent, Louisiana, a village

=== Elsewhere ===
- Vincent, Jura, France, a commune
- Vincent, Sud, Haiti, a village

== People with the name ==
- Vincent (actor), Indian actor from Kerala during the 1970s and 1980s in Malayalam films
- Vincent (music producer) (born 1995), Canadian electronic music producer and pianist
- Vincent (surname)

== Arts, entertainment, and media ==
=== Films ===
- Vincent (1982 film), a 1982 stop-motion short film by Tim Burton
- Vincent (1987 film), a documentary film by Australian director Paul Cox

=== Music ===
- "Vincent" (Don McLean song), by Don McLean as a tribute to Vincent Van Gogh, 1971
- "Vincent" (Sarah Connor song), by Sarah Connor, 2019
- "Vincent", a song by Car Seat Headrest from Teens of Denial, 2016

=== Other uses in arts, entertainment, and media ===
- Vincent (novel) or Torture the Artist, a novel by Joey Goebel
- Vincent (opera), a 1990 opera by Einojuhani Rautavaara
- Vincent (TV series), a television series on ITV1
- Goram and Vincent, legendary giants in the folklore of Bristol, UK

== Brands and enterprises ==
- Vincent Aviation, an airline in Wellington, New Zealand
- Vincent Motorcycles, a defunct British motorcycle manufacturer

== Other uses ==
- Vickers Vincent, a British biplane introduced in 1933
- Vincent Club, a private women's organization founded in 1892 to support the Vincent Memorial Hospital of Boston
- USS Vincent (SP-3246), a United States Navy patrol boat in commission from 1917 or 1918 to 1919

== See also ==
- Saint Vincent (disambiguation)
- Vince (disambiguation)
- Vincentia (disambiguation)
- Vinzant (disambiguation)
