= Redcap (TV series) =

British television drama series (1964–1966)

- Genre: Police drama
- Created by: Jack Bell
- Developed by: Richard Harrison
- Starring: John Thaw
- Country of origin: United Kingdom
- Original language: English
- No. of series: 2
- No. of episodes: 26 (2 missing, 1 incomplete)

Production
- Producer: John Bryce
- Editor: Ian Kennedy Martin
- Running time: 49–51 minutes
- Production company: ABC

Original release
- Network: ITV
- Release: 17 October 1964 – 25 June 1966

Redcap is a British television series produced by ABC Weekend TV and broadcast on the ITV network.

It starred John Thaw as Sergeant John Mann, a member of the Special Investigation Branch of the Royal Military Police and ran for two series and 26 episodes between 1964 and 1966. Other actors appearing in the series included Kenneth Colley, Keith Barron, John Noakes, Windsor Davies, David Battley, Allan Cuthbertson, Barry Evans, Hywel Bennett, Lloyd Reckord and Barry Letts. The series was created by Jack Bell and was written by Roger Marshall, Troy Kennedy-Martin, Jeremy Paul, Robert Holles and Richard Harris, among others.

Of the run, 23 of the 26 episodes still exist in their complete form (the missing/incomplete episodes are "The Moneylenders", "Strictly by the Book" and "An Ambush Among Friends").

== Episodes ==
=== Series 1 ===
#	Episode	Writer	Director	Original airdate
1	"It's What Comes After"	William Emms	Raymond Menmuir	17 October 1964
Mann encounters hostility from every quarter when he investigates a rape which took place inside an army barracks. Even the victim doesn't want to help him.
2	"A Town Called Love"	Anthony Steven (O.S. Jack Bell)	Raymond Menmuir	24 October 1964
Mann's search for a pimp who specialises in blackmailing soldiers leads him to a place that specialises in black market activity. Further investigations lead him to an unconscious woman and a vicious fight.
3	"Epitaph for a Sweat"	Richard Harris	Peter Graham Scott	31 October 1964
Mann finds himself in Aden trying to investigate the vicious beating of an Arab worker. Encountering prejudice at every turn, he has to determine whether it was self-defence or systemised brutality.
4	"Misfire"	Roger Marshall	Raymond Menmuir	7 November 1964
Mann is asked to make an independent inquiry into the case of a soldier who has confessed to robbery. Despite the soldier's insistence, Mann is led to believe that he is innocent. (The episode deals elliptically with homosexuality in the British military, without ever using the term.)
5	"Corporal McCann's Private War"	Troy Kennedy Martin	Peter Graham Scott	14 November 1964
Mann is sent to Cyprus to investigate a serving soldier who has gone AWOL with three Sterling sub-machine guns and six magazines of ammo.
6	"The Orderly Officer"	Julian Bond	Bill Bain	21 November 1964
New Year's Eve: An unpopular and weak-willed officer of the 1st Kings Own Lancers is browbeaten by a wily NCO into driving him to a party. On returning to the base, both drunk, they smash into a wall.
7	"Night Watch"	Troy Kennedy Martin	Bill Bain	28 November 1964
Returning a deserter to a regiment that has recently returned from Borneo, Mann is concerned when he is told that his prisoner's dementia is due to the soldiers being haunted by a ghost.
8	"The Boys of B Company"	Robert Holles	Raymond Menmuir	5 December 1964
Mann finds himself investigating a full-time cadet training unit. In the previous few weeks there has been one attempted suicide, whilst another cadet went AWOL after apparently going mad.
9	"A Regiment of the Line"	Leon Griffiths	Raymond Menmuir	12 December 1964
Passions run high when the Queen's Own Scottish Regiment are billeted in a town in West Germany which they had to take by force during the second world war. Despite friendly overtures, it's not long before fights start breaking out.
10	"The Man They Did"	Michael Ashe	Guy Verney	19 December 1964
A soldier dies of exhaustion on a forced march. His platoon leader believes that this may have been deliberate and, after their own investigation draws a blank, Mann is brought in to start enquiries.
11	"A Question of Initiative"	Jeremy Paul	Jonathan Alwyn	2 January 1965
A West German civilian is the victim of a hit and run, and a car is seen speeding from the scene with soldiers on board. The local Battle Camp insists that no-one was out of barracks that night so the local police bring in the SIB.
12	"A Place of Refuge"	Troy Kennedy Martin	Laurence Bourne	9 January 1965
What ties together the suicide of an officer and the court martial of another soldier on charges of embezzlement?
13	"The Patrol"	Troy Kennedy Martin	Guy Verney	16 January 1965
Mann joins a patrol in Borneo to get statements from three soldiers regarding an upcoming appeal. His zeal lands him in trouble, however, when the patrol comes under fire.

=== Series 2 ===
#	Episode	Writer	Director	Original airdate
14	"Crime Passionel"	Troy Kennedy Martin	Guy Verney	2 April 1966
A private soldier walks from the jungle into a private canteen and calmly shoots a sergeant with his sub-machine gun. There are dozens of witnesses yet the official report says it was an accidental shooting. Can Mann get to the truth?
15	"The Pride of the Regiment"	Arden Winch	Quentin Lawrence	9 April 1966
Mann is sent to investigate a pub brawl which got out of hand. Not only is his list of suspects huge, but this problem is also compounded when he discovers that they are all due to ship out to the Middle East in the next few days.
16	"The Killer"	Troy Kennedy Martin	Guy Verney	16 April 1966
A night-time commando raid on a sampan in the South China Sea ends in death for a member of the squad. Suspicion falls on the rest of the squad as this is the second death they've had recently, and Mann is asked to investigate.
17	"Buckingham Palace"	Troy Kennedy Martin	Guy Verney	23 April 1966
Mann's flight home from Aden is diverted to a bitter, snowbound Cyprus where a soldier has been found dead in the snow - with a knife in his back.
18	"Rough Justice"	Julian Bond	Quentin Lawrence	30 April 1966
Mann is sent to Cologne to investigate a potential case of fraud in a sergeant's mess, where the monthly allocation of alcohol is regularly exceeded. But as well as fraud there is also blackmail.
19	"The Moneylenders"	Eric Coltart	Raymond Menmuir	7 May 1966
This is a missing episode.
20	"Strictly by the Book"	Richard Harris	Quentin Lawrence	14 May 1966
This is a missing episode, although 12 minutes of this episode does exist from an engineer's test reel of film. The story sees Mann as the accused following an incident on a train.
21	"Paterson's Private Party"	Marshall Pugh	Quentin Lawrence	21 May 1966
Mann is sent to a jungle warfare training school to investigate the theft of a Sterling sub-machine gun. All signs point to it being stolen by some natives, but the head of the training camp is certain it's one of the soldiers.
22	"Stag Party"	Julian Bond	Raymond Menmuir	28 May 1966
A seedy game of strip poker in the Sergeants' Quarters of a busy Army base turns to horror when a hand grenade is thrown through the window.
23	"An Ambush Among Friends"	Roger Marshall	Quentin Lawrence	4 June 1966
This is a missing episode.
24	"The Alibi"	Thomas Clarke	Laurence Bourne	11 June 1966
Mann is brought into conflict with the local CID when a corporal is picked out of an identity parade and arrested for a theft that occurred in a radio shop the previous evening.
25	"The Proper Charlie"	Robert Storey	Guy Verney	18 June 1966
When an inept private soldier is viciously beaten unconscious in a street fight, suspicion falls on Sergeant Cole - a domineering NCO who has "personal issues" with the unfortunate private.
26	"Information Received"	Richard Harris	Raymond Menmuir	25 June 1966
Mann is forced to investigate one of his own when an anonymous letter implicates a SIB sergeant in a large-scale petrol theft.
