= Guns at Batasi =

- Cinema poster
- Directed by: John Guillermin
- Screenplay by: Robert Holles
- Story by: Leo Marks; Marshall Pugh
- Based on: The Siege of Battersea by Robert Holles
- Produced by: George H. Brown
- Starring: Richard Attenborough; Flora Robson; John Leyton; Jack Hawkins; Mia Farrow
- Cinematography: Douglas Slocombe
- Edited by: Max Benedict
- Music by: John Addison
- Distributed by: 20th Century Fox
- Release dates: September 1964 (UK); 16 November 1964 (US)
- Running time: 103 minutes
- Country: United Kingdom
- Language: English

Guns at Batasi is a 1964 British drama film starring Richard Attenborough, Jack Hawkins, Flora Robson, John Leyton and Mia Farrow. The film is based on the 1962 novel The Siege of Battersea by Robert Holles and was directed by John Guillermin. Although the action is set in an overseas colonial military outpost during the last days of the British Empire in East Africa, filming was done at Pinewood Studios in the United Kingdom.

== Plot ==
Regimental Sergeant Major Lauderdale—a martinet—is the senior warrant officer at a King's African Rifles base in an unnamed African country. Lauderdale and the senior officers and sergeants are white British Army personnel from other Commonwealth nations; their subordinates are black natives. Men poke fun at Lauderdale's strict demeanor behind his back, but respect him and fear his wrath.

A rowdy political demonstration takes place during an election in the nearby town of Batasi. Colonel Deal, the white British commanding officer, learns that British Army personnel have been ordered to abstain from exercises, remain confined to their respective messes, and hand over command to African subordinates. They are expecting a visit by Miss Barker-Wise, a Member of Parliament, and planning celebrations of the birthday of Queen Elizabeth II. Deal gives command to a black officer, Captain Abraham, who places his black subordinate Lieutenant Boniface in charge for the night with orders not to issue ammunition. Boniface throws the orders away.

A native mob attacks a taxi carrying Private Wilkes, a young white British Army soldier, and Karen Eriksson, a young white female UN typist. Deal is ordered to immediately visit the deputy commissioner, and orders Lauderdale to confine his men to the sergeants' mess and prepare to host Barker-Wise. Lauderdale is surprised by the arrival of Eriksson and Wilkes, who explains they were stranded and he did not know where else to take her. Lauderdale profanely reprimands Wilkes and is embarrassed to notice Barker-Wise listening. Barker-Wise tells the sergeants she knows Boniface personally, sympathizes with his politics, and thinks Lauderdale is too condescending towards the Africans.

Boniface and his soldiers disarm the sentry at the arsenal and steal ammunition. He arrests Abraham and tells the white British officers they will be shot if they leave their mess. Boniface forces Abraham onto a lorry and explains he will be charged with treason. As it drives away, Abraham and others jump out, but the soldiers guarding them open fire. Mortally wounded, Abraham staggers into the sergeants’ mess, interrupting the birthday dinner.

Lauderdale, enraged by the mutiny, orders his men to fortify the mess. The sergeants intimidate Boniface's arsenal sentries and arm themselves. Boniface, believing Abraham dead, orders Lauderdale to stand down. When Lauderdale harangues him for failing to remove his hat inside the mess, Boniface acquiesces. Lauderdale declares he will only stand down on Deal's orders. Wilkes, who has been kissing Eriksson, sneaks into her room after he is relieved of guard duty.

During the armed standoff that has ensued, Barker-Wise slips away to tell Boniface that Abraham is convalescing in the sergeants' mess. Boniface refuses to grant him clemency, clearly despising her lack of resolve. Deal learns the British are on good terms with the new government, but is detained by a mob while returning to the base. Boniface threatens to destroy the mess using a pair of Bofors guns if Abraham is not handed over. Abraham attempts to leave but collapses and Lauderdale decides to disable the guns. He and Wilkes cross the main road while the sergeants sing loudly to distract Boniface’s men. Lauderdale is stymied because the guns are guarded, but Boniface suddenly gathers his men for a meeting, and Lauderdale and Wilkes blow up the guns.

Deal arrives and tells Lauderdale the British have agreed to peacefully transfer authority to the new native government. Deeming Lauderdale's actions an embarrassment, the British administration has ordered Lauderdale to leave the country before the handover ceremony. Deal tells him he would have done the same things in his position. Lauderdale angrily throws a shot glass in the mess, accidentally breaking the framed portrait of Elizabeth II, before regaining his composure and pridefully marching away as patriotic music swells.

== Cast ==
- Richard Attenborough as Regimental Sergeant Major Lauderdale.
- Jack Hawkins as Colonel Deal
- Flora Robson as Miss Barker-Wise
- John Leyton as Private Wilkes
- Mia Farrow as Karen Eriksson
- Cecil Parker as Fletcher
- Errol John as Lieutenant Boniface
- Graham Stark as Sergeant 'Dodger' Brown
- Earl Cameron as Captain Abraham
- Percy Herbert as Colour Sergeant Ben Parkin
- David Lodge as Sergeant 'Muscles' Dunn
- John Meillon as Sergeant 'Aussie' Drake
- Bernard Horsfall as Sergeant 'Schoolie' Prideaux
- Patrick Holt as Captain
- Alan Browning as Adjutant
- Richard Bidlake as Lieutenant
- Horace James as Corporal Abou
- Joseph Layode as Archibong Shaw
- Ric Hutton as Russell

== Production ==
=== Writing ===
The novel The Siege at Battersea by Robert Holles was originally published in 1962. It was adapted as a screenplay by a son of a sergeant major and former boy soldier, later army sergeant Holles. An original adaptation was credited to Leo Marks, Marshall Pugh, and additional material by C. M. Pennington-Richards.

=== Pre-production ===
The film was originally to be made by Roy and John Boulting, who wanted to make a return to drama after a series of comedies. "We think the time is ripe for us to return to the serious subject", said Roy Boulting.

Roy Boulting said he intended to start filming in August 1963 at Shepperton Studios with four weeks location filming in West Africa. The budget of $1 million was to be provided by Bryanston Films and British Lion. However the film would eventually instead be made by John Guillermin and 20th Century Fox.

=== Filming ===
The film, which was shot in CinemaScope, was made entirely at Pinewood Studios between February and April 1964 although it was set in tropical Africa (it was made at the same time as Goldfinger). The exterior night scenes were filmed on a sound stage and the opening scenes were shot on Salisbury Plain. Cinematographer Douglas Slocombe was used for this film.

Britt Ekland was originally cast as Karen Eriksson but pulled out three weeks into production. The Swedish actress had just married Peter Sellers, who apparently was so paranoid about her having an affair with John Leyton, that he secretly asked his old acting friends, David Lodge and Graham Stark who were co-starring in the picture, to spy on his new wife. After being quizzed nightly on the telephone by Sellers about her scenes and who she was with, Ekland left the shoot to join Sellers in Los Angeles. Ekland has said that Sellers insisted that she leave the set, come to Los Angeles, then claim that an illness prevented her from returning. Her role was quickly recast and completed by Mia Farrow. In response 20th Century Fox sued Ekland for $1.5 million; Sellers counter-sued for $4 million claiming the Fox suit caused him "mental distress and injury to his health".

== Reception ==
=== Box office ===
According to Fox records, the film needed to earn $1,400,000 in film rentals to break even and made $1,845,000, meaning it made a profit.

=== Critical ===
FilmInk says "A subject like this is a political minefield, with its hot topic subjects of imperialism, militarism, race, emerging democracies, etc. It works best as a siege story, on which basis it is very exciting."

Richard Attenborough won a BAFTA Award for Best British Actor for his performance in this film as R.S.M. Lauderdale as well as for his performance in Séance on a Wet Afternoon at the 18th British Academy Film Awards.

The historian Wendy Webster has more recently reflected that "The film continuously asserts the racial superiority of the British and at the same time shows that such superiority no longer provides any guarantee of authority or power. Guns at Batasi is an elegy for the soldier hero, particularly the imperial soldier, and is infused by imperial nostalgia."

== Soundtrack ==
The score was recorded by the Sinfonia of London orchestra.

== Home media ==
The DVD commentary on the making of the film is narrated by John Leyton.
