= Vicentino (surname) =

Vicentino (pronounced [vitʃenˈtiːno]) is a rare Italian surname, historically denoting personalities from Vicenza. Notable people with the surname include:

- Andrea Vicentino (c. 1542–1617), Italian painter
- Francesco Vicentino (fl. 16th century), Italian painter
- Giuseppe Niccolò Vicentino (b. 1525, fl. 1550), Italian painter and wood engraver
- Ludovico Vicentino degli Arrighi (c. 1475–c. 1527), papal scribe and type designer
- Nicola Vicentino (1511–c. 1575), Italian music theorist and composer
- Valerio Vicentino (c. 1468–1546), Italian medallist, gem engraver and goldsmith
- Zoppo Vicentino (1671–1751), Italian painter

== See also ==
- Vicentino Prestes de Almeida (1900–1954), Brazilian paleontologist
- Vicentini
- Visentin
