= Froideville =

Froideville may refer to:

- Froideville, Vaud, a municipality in the canton of Vaud in Switzerland
- Froideville, Jura, a commune in the French region of Franche-Comté
