= Vinzant =

Vinzant may refer to:

- Cynthia Vinzant, American mathematician
- Dennis Vinzant (1906–1976), American multi-sport athlete and coach
- Vinzant Software, American software firm based in Indiana

== See also ==
- Vincent (disambiguation)
