= Vincentian =

Vincentian can refer to:

== People ==
- A citizen of Saint Vincent and the Grenadines
- A person from Saint Vincent (island), the largest island in Saint Vincent and the Grenadines
- A member of one of the orders or societies in the Vincentian Family, both Catholic and Anglican, including
  - Society of Saint Vincent de Paul
  - Congregation of the Mission
  - Daughters of Charity of Saint Vincent de Paul
- A student or alumnus of St. Vincent's High School, Pune, India
- A student or alumnus of Saint Vincent's College, Dipolog, Philippines.

== Organisations ==
- Vincentian Academy, a Roman Catholic preparatory school in Pittsburgh, Pennsylvania
- Vincentian Studies Institute, an institute at DePaul University in Chicago, Illinois

== See also ==
- Vincentia (disambiguation)
