= Vincentia =

Vincentia may refer to:

== Places ==
- Vincentia, New South Wales, town in Australia
- Vicenza, city in northern Italy

== Organisms ==
- Vincentia (fish), a genus of fishes
- Vincentia, junior synonym of the plant genus Grewia

== See also ==
- Vicentina (disambiguation)
- Vincent (disambiguation)
- Vincentian (disambiguation)
- Vincenza
