= Vicentina =

Vicentina may refer to:

== Places ==
=== Brazil ===
- Vicentina, Mato Grosso do Sul

=== Ecuador ===
- La Vicentina, Quito

=== Italy ===
- Altavilla Vicentina, Vicenza
- Fiumicello Villa Vicentina, Udine
  - Villa Vicentina, Udine
- Isola Vicentina, Vicenza
- Noventa Vicentina, Vicenza

== Cuisine ==
- Baccalà alla vicentina, an Italian stockfish dish
- Sopressa vicentina, an Italian cured sausage

== Other uses ==
- Banca Popolare Vicentina, an Italian bank
- Collegia Vicentina, intellectual meetings in Vicenza in 1546
- Tillandsia vicentina, a Central American species of flowering plant
- Vicentina sheep, an Italian breed of domestic sheep

== See also ==
- Vicentino (disambiguation)
- Vincentia (disambiguation)
