= Visentini =

Visentini is an Italian surname from Veneto and other areas of Northern Italy, derived from Venetian vixentin ('from Vicenza'). Notable people with the surname include:

- Antonio Visentini (1688–1782), Italian architect, painter and engraver
- Bruno Visentini (1914–1995), Italian politician
- Luca Visentini (born 1969), Italian trade unionist and poet
- Roberto Visentini (born 1957), Italian cyclist

== See also ==
- Cantiere Navale Visentini, Italian shipbuilder
- Vicentini
- Visentin
- Visintin
- Visintini
