= Visintin =

Visintin is an Italian surname from Friuli-Venezia Giulia, derived from Venetian vixentin or Friulian visintin ('from Vicenza'). Notable people with the surname include:

- Bruno Visintin (1932–2015), Italian boxer
- Omar Visintin (born 1989), Italian snowboarder

== See also ==
- Visintini
- Visentin
- Visentini
