= Lionel Crabb =

Royal Navy frogman and MI6 diver

Lieutenant-Commander Lionel Crabb OBE GM
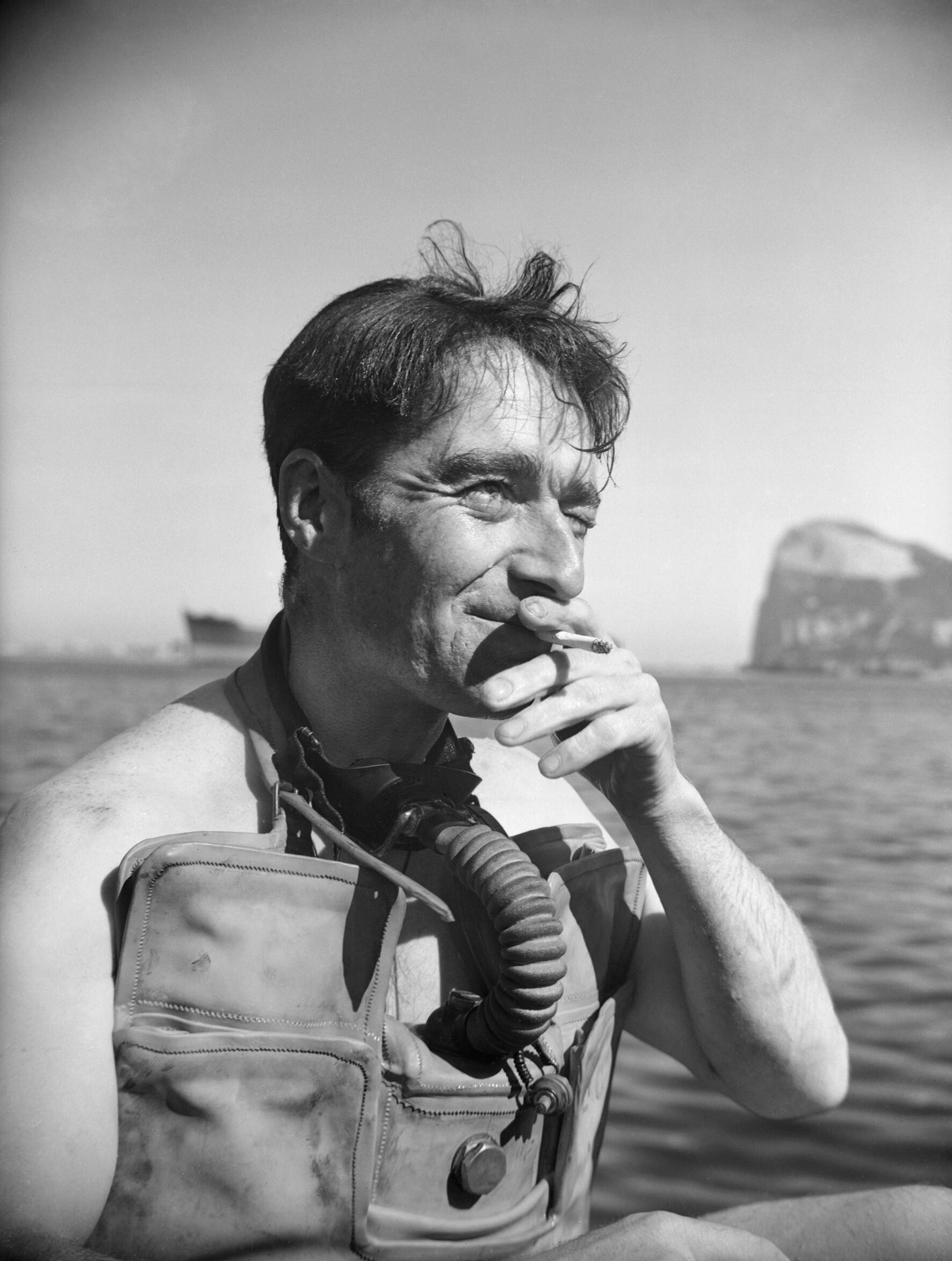
- Crabb, April 1944
- Born: 28 January 1909; London, England
- Died: 19 April 1956 (aged 47) (presumed dead)
- Military career
- Allegiance: United Kingdom
- Branch: Royal Navy
- Service years: 1941–1947
- Rank: Lieutenant-Commander
- Nickname: Buster
- Conflicts: World War II
- Awards: Order of the British Empire; George Medal
- Other work: MI6 diver

Lieutenant-Commander Lionel Kenneth Philip Crabb, OBE, GM (28 January 1909 – presumed dead 19 April 1956), known as Buster Crabb, was a Royal Navy frogman and diver who vanished during a reconnaissance mission for MI6 around a Soviet Navy cruiser berthed at Portsmouth Dockyard in 1956.

== Early life ==
Lionel Crabb was born in 1909 to Hugh Alexander Crabb and Beatrice (née Goodall) of Streatham, south-west London. They were a poor family; Hugh Crabb was a commercial traveller for a firm of photographic merchants. In his youth Crabb held many jobs but after two years training for a career at sea in the school ship HMS Conway he joined the merchant navy and the Royal Naval Reserve before World War II.

== Second World War ==
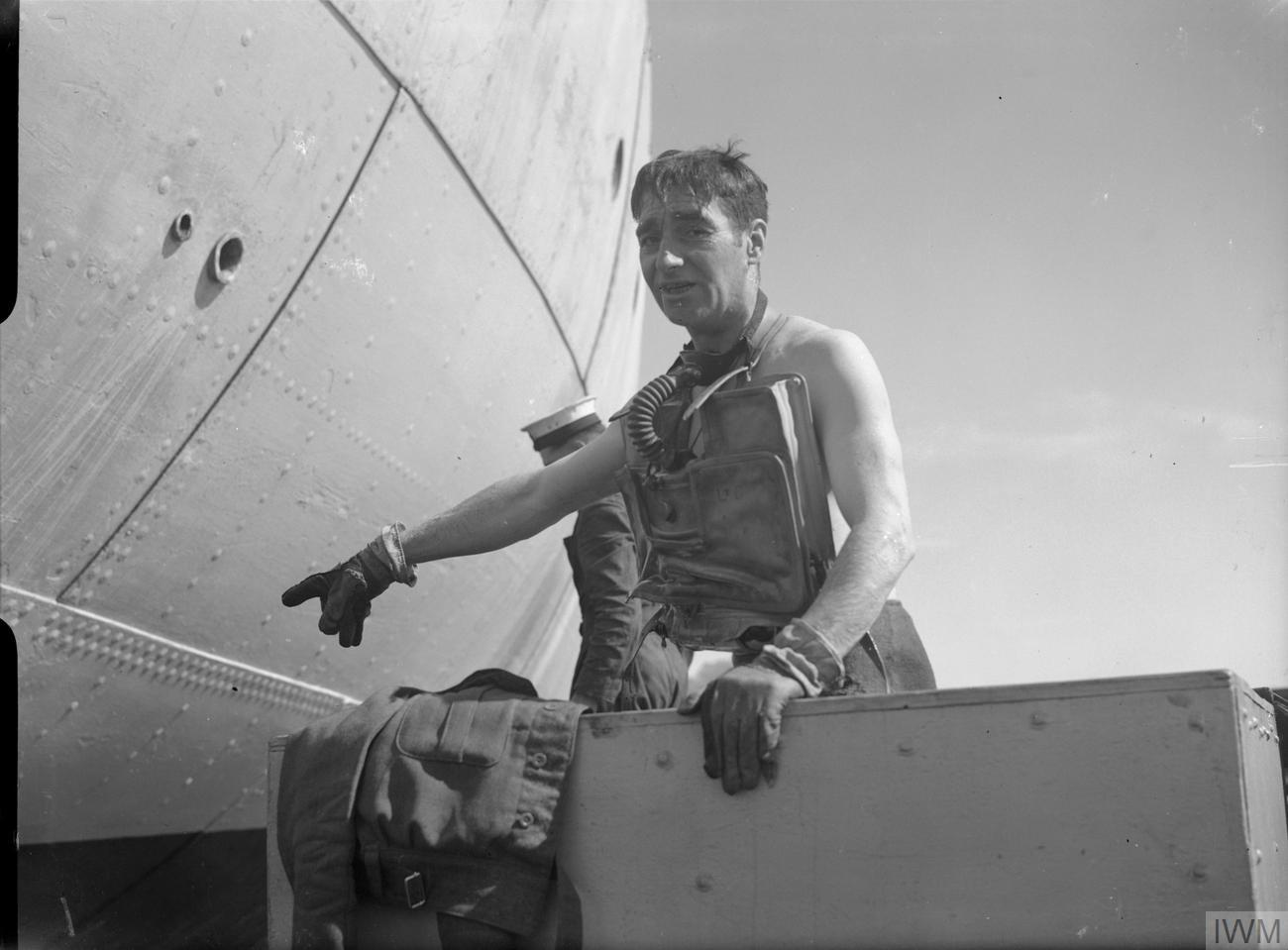
Crabb in Gibraltar

At the outbreak of the Second World War, Crabb was first an army gunner. Then, in 1941, he joined the Royal Navy. The next year he was sent to Gibraltar where he worked in a mine and bomb disposal unit to remove the Italian limpet mines that enemy divers had attached to the hulls of Allied ships. Initially, Crabb's job was to disarm mines that British divers removed, but eventually he decided to learn to dive.

He was one of a group of underwater clearance divers who checked for limpet mines in Gibraltar harbour during the period of Italian frogman and manned torpedo attacks by the Decima Flottiglia MAS. They dived with oxygen rebreathers, Davis Submerged Escape Apparatus, which until then had not been used much if at all for swimming down from the surface. At first they swam by breaststroke without swimfins.

On 8 December 1942, during one such attack, two of the Italian frogmen, Lieutenant Visintini and Petty Officer Magro, died, probably killed by small explosive charges thrown from harbour-defence patrol boats, a tactic said to have been introduced by Crabb. Their bodies were recovered, and their swimfins and Scuba sets were taken and from then on used by Sydney Knowles and Crabb.

== Awards ==
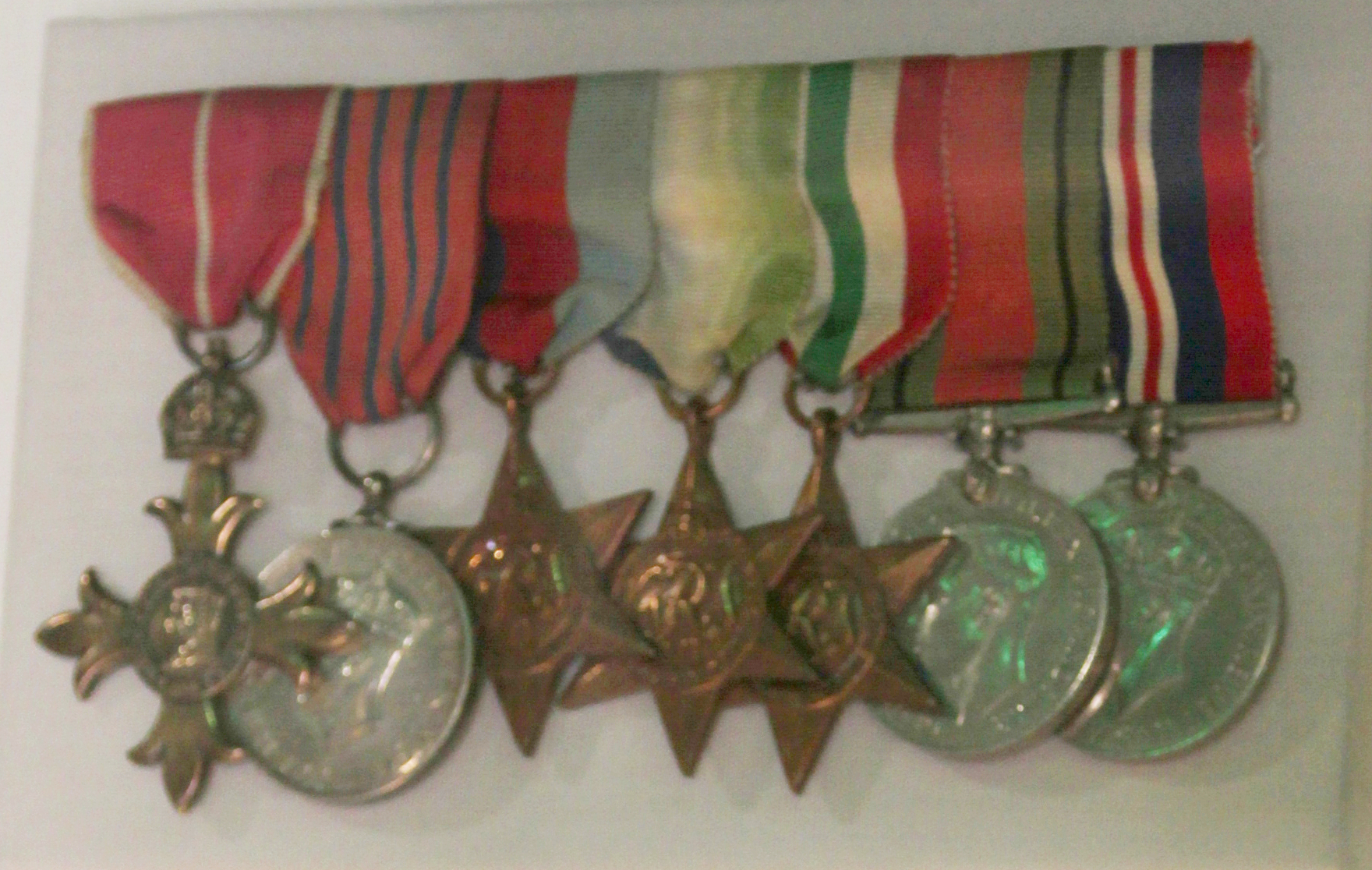
Medals awarded to Lionel Crabb.

Crabb was awarded the George Medal for his efforts and was promoted to lieutenant commander. In 1943 he became Principal Diving Officer for Northern Italy, and was assigned to clear mines in the ports of Livorno and Venice; he was later made an OBE, an Officer of the Order of the British Empire, for these services. He was also an investigating diver in the suspicious death of General Władysław Sikorski of the Polish Land Forces, whose B-24 Liberator aircraft crashed into the sea off Gibraltar in 1943.

By this time, he had gained the nickname "Buster", after the American actor and swimmer Buster Crabbe. After the war, Crabb was stationed in Palestine and led an underwater explosives disposal team that removed mines placed by Jewish divers from the Palyam, the maritime force of the Palmach elite Jewish fighting force during the years of Mandatory Palestine. After 1947, he was demobilised from the military.

== Civilian diver ==
Crabb moved to a civilian job and used his diving skills to explore the wreck of a Spanish galleon from the 1588 Armada, off Tobermory on the Isle of Mull. He then located a suitable site for a discharge pipe for the Atomic Weapons Establishment at Aldermaston. He later returned to work for the Royal Navy. He twice dived to investigate sunken Royal Navy submarines — HMS Truculent in January 1950 and HMS Affray in 1951 — to find out whether there were any survivors. Both efforts proved fruitless. In 1952, Crabb married Margaret Elaine Player, the daughter of Henry Charles Brackenbury Williamson and the former wife of Ernest Albert Player. The couple separated in 1953 and divorced about two years later.

In 1955, Crabb took frogman Sydney Knowles with him to investigate the hull of a Soviet Sverdlov-class cruiser to evaluate its superior manoeuvrability. According to Knowles, they found a circular opening at the ship's bow and inside it a large propeller that could be directed to give thrust to the bow. That same year, in March, Crabb was made to retire due to his age, but a year later he was recruited by MI6. By that time, Crabb's heavy drinking and smoking had taken its toll on his health, and he was not the diver that he had been in World War II.

== Crabb Affair ==
=== Disappearance ===
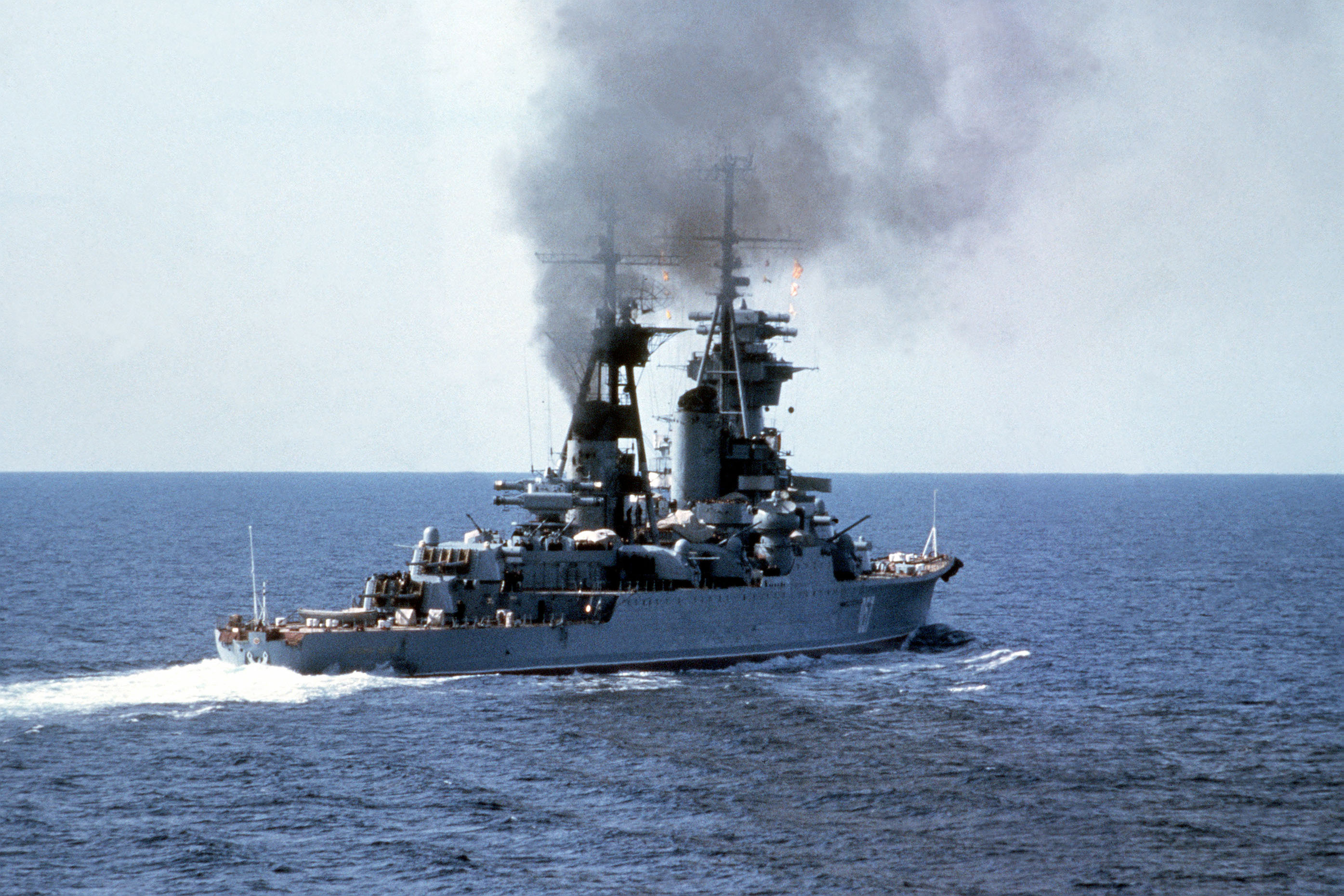
Ordzhonikidze was a Sverdlov-class cruiser similar to that shown in this photograph (Alexander Nevsky).

MI6 recruited Crabb in 1956 to investigate the Soviet cruiser Ordzhonikidze that had brought the First Secretary of the Communist Party Nikita Khrushchev and Soviet Premier Nikolai Bulganin on a diplomatic mission to Britain. According to Peter Wright in his book Spycatcher (1987), Crabb was sent to investigate Ordzhonikidze's propeller, a new design that Naval Intelligence wanted to examine. On 19 April 1956, Crabb dived into Portsmouth Harbour and his MI6 controller never saw him again.

Years later, a Russian who had been on board Ordzhonikidze claimed that the Soviets were expecting him that night (after being tipped off about the British operation by a mole) and that he dived into the dark and dirty waters beneath the Ordzhonikidze, hunted down Crabb, and slit his air hose and his throat with a knife. Crabb's companion in the Sally Port Hotel took all his belongings and even the page of the hotel register on which they had written their names. Ten days later British newspapers published stories about Crabb's disappearance in an underwater mission.

MI6 tried to cover up this espionage mission. On 29 April, under instructions from Rear Admiral John Inglis, the Director of Naval Intelligence, the Admiralty announced that Crabb had vanished when he had taken part in trials of secret underwater apparatus in Stokes Bay on the Solent. The Soviets answered by releasing a statement stating that the crew of Ordzhonikidze had seen a frogman near the cruiser on 19 April.

It was reported by Radio Moscow that the Kremlin had sent an official note to the United Kingdom concerning what Pravda described as "shameful espionage". The Foreign Office reportedly replied: "Commander Crabb carried out frogman tests, and, as is assumed, lost his life during these tests. His presence in the vicinity of the destroyers occurred without any permission whatever, and Her Majesty's Government express their regret at the incident."

British newspapers speculated that the Soviets had captured Crabb and taken him to the Soviet Union. The British Prime Minister Anthony Eden disapproved of the fact that MI6 had operated without his consent in the UK (the preserve of the Security Service, "MI5"). It is mistakenly claimed that Eden forced director-general John Sinclair to resign following the incident; in fact he had determined to replace Sinclair with MI5 director-general Dick White before the incident. The Prime Minister told the House of Commons it was not in the public interest to disclose the circumstances in which Crabb was presumed to have met his end.

=== Body found ===
A little less than 14 months after Crabb's disappearance, on 9 June 1957, a body in a diving suit was brought to the surface in their net by two fishermen off Pilsey Island in Chichester Harbour. The body was brought to shore in a landing craft (Note: A Second World War Assault Landing Craft, ALC148) operated by members of RAF Marine Craft Unit No. 1107.

It was missing its head and both hands, which made it impossible to identify (using then-available technology). According to British diving expert Rob Hoole, the body had the same height as Crabb, the same body-hair colour, and was dressed in the same clothes, Pirelli two-piece diving suit and Admiralty Pattern swim fins that Crabb was wearing when he embarked on his final mission. Hoole wrote that given the length of time that Crabb's body had been in the water, there was "nothing sinister" about the missing head and hands. Crabb's ex-wife was not sure enough to identify the body, nor was Crabb's girlfriend, Pat Rose.

Sydney Knowles was requested to identify the body shortly after its discovery. He described the body as being clad in a faded green rubber frogman suit of a type issued to Royal Navy divers, and the remains of a white sweater. The suit had been cut open from the neck to the groin and along both legs, revealing very dark pubic hair. Knowles examined the body closely, looking for a Y-shaped scar behind the left knee and a prominent scar on the left thigh. He failed to find any scars on the body and stated that it was not Crabb.

A pathologist, Dr. D. P. King, examined the body and stated in a short report for the inquest that a careful examination of the body failed to reveal any scars or marks of identification.

=== Inquest ===
The inquest was opened on 11 June 1957 by Bridgman, who had received the pathologist's report that there was no way of establishing identity. As neither Knowles nor Crabb's ex-wife nor a Lieutenant McLanahan, a Royal Navy torpedo officer from HMS Vernon, had been able to identify the body, Bridgman adjourned the inquest until 26 June to allow time for identification.

The inquest was resumed on 26 June. The pathologist, King, gave evidence that he had returned to the mortuary and re-examined the body on 14 June. He reported that he had found a scar in the shape of an inverted Y on the left side of the left knee, and a scar on the left thigh, about the size of a sixpenny coin. King stated that the scar had been photographed whilst he was present.

As information was declassified under the 50-year rule, new facts on Crabb's disappearance came to light. On 27 October 2006, the National Archives released papers relating to the fatal Ordzhonikidze mission. Sydney Knowles, a former diving partner of Crabb's, stated in a televised interview on Inside Out – South on 19 January 2007 that Crabb did not dive alone on his fatal last mission: "He told me they'd given him a buddy diver." Furthermore, papers released under the Freedom of Information Act indicate that there were other divers investigating Ordzhonikidze while the ship was in Portsmouth Harbour. On 9 November 2007, The Independent reported how the government had covered up the death of 'Buster' Crabb.

In a 1968 retrospective on the affair, Time reported that a skull, thought by some to be Crabb's, was found in early March 1967 on a beach near Portsmouth.

== Theories and speculations ==
=== Died during Soviet interrogation ===
After he was released from prison, the spy Harry Houghton wrote a book called Operation Portland in which he claimed that, in July 1956, his Russian handler, a man he knew as Roman, had told him how Crabb had died. Houghton said that, shortly before the Soviet visit, he had been meeting Roman in a pub in Puncknowle, Dorset, and happened to see a friend who worked at the Underwater Detection Establishment with her boyfriend, who was a diver. The boyfriend was annoyed that he had been training for something special, which had just been called off. Shortly after hearing that, Roman had cut short the meeting.

According to Houghton's account, after assessing that divers might be planning some activity relating to Ordzhonikidze, the Soviet Navy arranged for six underwater sentries to watch the bottom of the ship, which had been fitted with wire jack-stays on either side to help them hold on. When Crabb arrived, a struggle ensued in which Crabb's air supply was turned off and he passed out. He was then hauled on board and taken to the sick bay, having passed out a second time, where he was given medical treatment.

When Crabb had recovered sufficiently, the Soviets began to interrogate him. He was making a confession when he collapsed and did not recover. Aware that they might be accused of causing his death, the Soviets decided to fix his body lightly to the bottom of the ship so that it came loose once the ship was under way. However, the body tangled in something underwater, which meant it was not discovered for fourteen months. Houghton advanced the theory that Crabb's mission was to plant a small limpet mine on Ordzhonikidze, the purpose of which was to detect whether the Soviet Navy was using the latest sonar technology. If it was, the mine would detonate and the ship would slow down; if not, the mine would eventually detach and fall to the bottom of the sea.

=== Killed by the Soviets ===
In a 1990 interview, Joseph Zwerkin, a former member of Soviet Naval intelligence, who had moved to Israel after the breakup of the Soviet Union, claimed that the Soviets had noticed Crabb in the water and that a Soviet sniper had shot him.

On 16 November 2007, the BBC and the Daily Mirror reported that Eduard Koltsov, a Soviet frogman, claimed to have caught Crabb placing a mine on the hull of Ordzhonikidze and cut his throat. In an interview for a Russian documentary film, Koltsov showed the dagger he claimed to have used, as well as an Order of the Red Star medal that he said had been awarded for the deed. A Russian journalist from the military newspaper Krasnaya Zvezda considered Koltsov's story improbable. In particular, the archive documents did not confirm that Koltsov, a bus driver in Rostov-on-Don for 30 years, had been awarded the Order of the Red Star or was a Soviet Navy frogman.

Official British government documents regarding Crabb's disappearance are not scheduled to be released until 2057.

=== Captured, brainwashed, defected or a double agent ===
Certain Members of Parliament and Michael Hall became concerned about Crabb's ultimate fate. Commander J.S. Kerans of HMS Amethyst fame in 1961 and Marcus Lipton in 1964 both submitted proposals to re-open the case but were rebuffed. Various people speculated that Crabb had been killed by some secret Soviet underwater weapon; that he had been captured and imprisoned in Lefortovo Prison with prisoner number 147, that he had been brainwashed to work for the Soviet Union to train their frogman teams; that he had defected and become a commander in the Soviet Navy under the assumed name of Leonid Krabov; that he was in the Soviet Special Task Underwater Operational Command in the Black Sea Fleet; or that MI6 had asked him to defect so he could become a double agent.

=== MI5 theory ===
Tim Binding wrote a fictionalised account of Crabb's life, Man Overboard, that was published by Picador in 2005. Binding stated that, following the book's publication, he was contacted by Sydney Knowles. Binding alleged that he then met Knowles in Spain and was told that Crabb was known by MI5 to have intentions of defecting to the Soviet Union. This would have been embarrassing for the UK — Crabb being an acknowledged war hero. Knowles has suggested that MI5 set up the mission to the Ordzhonikidze specifically to murder Crabb, and supplied Crabb with a new diving partner who was under orders to kill him. Binding stated Knowles alleged that he was ordered by MI5 to identify the body found as Crabb, when he knew it was definitely not Crabb. Knowles went along with the deception.

Knowles has also alleged that his life was threatened in Torremolinos in 1989, at a time when Knowles was in discussions with a biographer. About the claims that Crabb was planning to defect to the Soviet Union, Reg Vallintine of the Historical Diving Society was quoted as saying: "Diving historians find it very hard to believe that this man, who prided himself on being a patriot, would have seriously considered defecting. Crabb was very fond of being a hero, and it is hard to imagine him jeopardising that status."

=== Death by misadventure ===
The British diving expert Rob Hoole wrote in 2007 that Crabb had probably died of oxygen poisoning or perhaps carbon dioxide poisoning, and that Crabb's age and poor health caused by his heavy drinking and smoking had made him unsuitable for the mission that he had been assigned. In support of the death by misadventure theory, Hoole noted that before disappearing on his second attempt to dive Ordzhonikidze, Crabb had during his first attempt experienced equipment failure, which suggested that Crabb's equipment was not up to standard. Crabb's MI6 officer Nicholas Elliott always took the view that Crabb had suffered equipment failure, or his health had given way, and that his reputation had been unfairly dragged through the mud.

=== Historical media ===
In a war documentary series titled Secrets of War, episode titled "The Cold War. Khrushchev's Regime", a 1996 interview with former head of the KGB Vladimir Semichastny (who was the first secretary of Komsomol at the time of Crabb's disappearance) reported, Crabb's decapitated body was found floating in the harbour two months after his disappearance. In the interview, Semichastny states that the "Crabb Affair" was handled "elegantly".

== Legacy ==
As of 2024, a Gibraltar-based Sea-class Diving Support Boat of the Royal Navy is named for Lionel Crabb.

== References in popular culture ==
- Crabb's time in Gibraltar is covered in the film The Silent Enemy (1958), with Laurence Harvey portraying Crabb.
- Crabb's life and death is investigated in a 2023, eight-part podcast series called Ministry of Secrets, written and narrated by Giles Milton.
- Tim Binding's novel Man Overboard (2005) is a fictional memoir of Crabb, who looks back over his career from a sanatorium in Czechoslovakia, having been seized by the KGB on his final mission for British intelligence.
- Crabb appears in the first issue of Warren Ellis' comic Ignition City.
- John Ainsworth Davis/Christopher Creighton in his thinly disguised fictional account The Krushchev Objective (1987) with co-author Noel Hynd, states he was the second diver with Crabb that thwarted an assassination attempt on the Soviet dictator by defusing limpet mines.
- The "Crabb affair" inspired Ian Fleming's James Bond adventure Thunderball.
- The frogman briefly seen in the Tintin book The Red Sea Sharks was based on a photograph of Crabb.
- The Crabb affair features in Edward Wilson's novel The Envoy (London, Arcadia Books, 2008).
- The discovery of Crabb's body is mentioned in Ian McEwan's novel The Innocent, which is set in 1956. His last name is misspelled "Crabbe" in the book.
- Crabb's mission appeared in a May 28, 1956 issue of Life magazine entitled "THE MYSTERY OF THE FROGMAN'S DIVE FOR RED SECRETS".

== See also ==
- List of people who disappeared mysteriously (pre-1910)
- Italian auxiliary ship Olterra
