= Italian auxiliary ship Olterra =

Undercover Italian auxiliary ship from World War II

Coordinates: 36°8′33″N 5°26′8″W

- Part of the Battle of the Mediterranean of World War II
- Olterra at anchor shortly before being broken up at Vado Ligure, 1961
Date	8 December 1942 – 4 August 1943
Location	Gibraltar, Western Mediterranean
Result	42,000 GRT of Allied shipping sunk

Belligerents
United Kingdom	Italy

Commanders and leaders
Lionel Crabb	Licio Visintini; Ernesto Notari

Strength
Harbour defenses	1 mother ship; 9 human torpedoes

Casualties and losses
6 merchant ships sunk; 2 sailors killed	3 divers killed; 3 prisoners; 2 maiali lost

The auxiliary ship Olterra was a 5,000 GRT Italian tanker scuttled by her crew at Algeciras in the Bay of Gibraltar on 10 June 1940, after the entry of Italy into the Second World War. She was recovered in 1942 by a special unit of the Decima Flottiglia MAS to be used as a clandestine base for maiali (manned torpedoes) to attack Allied shipping at Gibraltar.

== Construction and early career ==
Olterra started life as the tanker Osage. She was built in 1913 by Palmer's Ship Building and Iron Co Ltd, Tyneside in England, for a German company. Osage was sold to the Standard Oil Co in New York in 1914 and renamed Baton Rouge. In 1925 she was again sold, this time to the European Shipping Co. Ltd of London and renamed Olterra. As Olterra she passed through the hands of the British Oil Shipping Co. Ltd and in 1930 was bought by Andrea Zanchi in Genoa. On 10 June 1940, when Italy entered the Second World War by declaring war on France and the United Kingdom, Olterra found herself in the Bay of Gibraltar off Algeciras, Spain. She was scuttled by her own crew to prevent her capture by British forces from Gibraltar.

== Previous operations ==
From 24 September 1940 to 15 September 1942, there were six submarine-borne assaults on Gibraltar. Three of them resulted in the destruction or sinking of Allied freighters, with a total tonnage of some 40,000 GRT. Three of them were carried out by human torpedoes launched from the submarine Scirè; the other two were the work of combat swimmers.

=== Villa Carmela ===
After the attacks carried out by Scirè, the commander of the Decima MAS realized that, given the limitations of using a submarine as a mother ship for human torpedoes in Gibraltar, it would be more feasible to mount a secret base in neutral Spain. A first step in that direction was taken when a member of the Decima, Antonio Ramognino, rented a bungalow along the coast road near Algeciras, right in front of a bay used by Allied convoys as an anchorage. The operations from Villa Carmela were carried out by combat swimmers. Because Ramognino's wife was a Spanish citizen, he had little difficulty establishing his 'home' there. Five merchant ships were sunk or damaged from July to September 1942 by frogmen from Villa Carmela using limpet mines. Olterra played the role of advanced observation post for those missions.

== Refitting ==
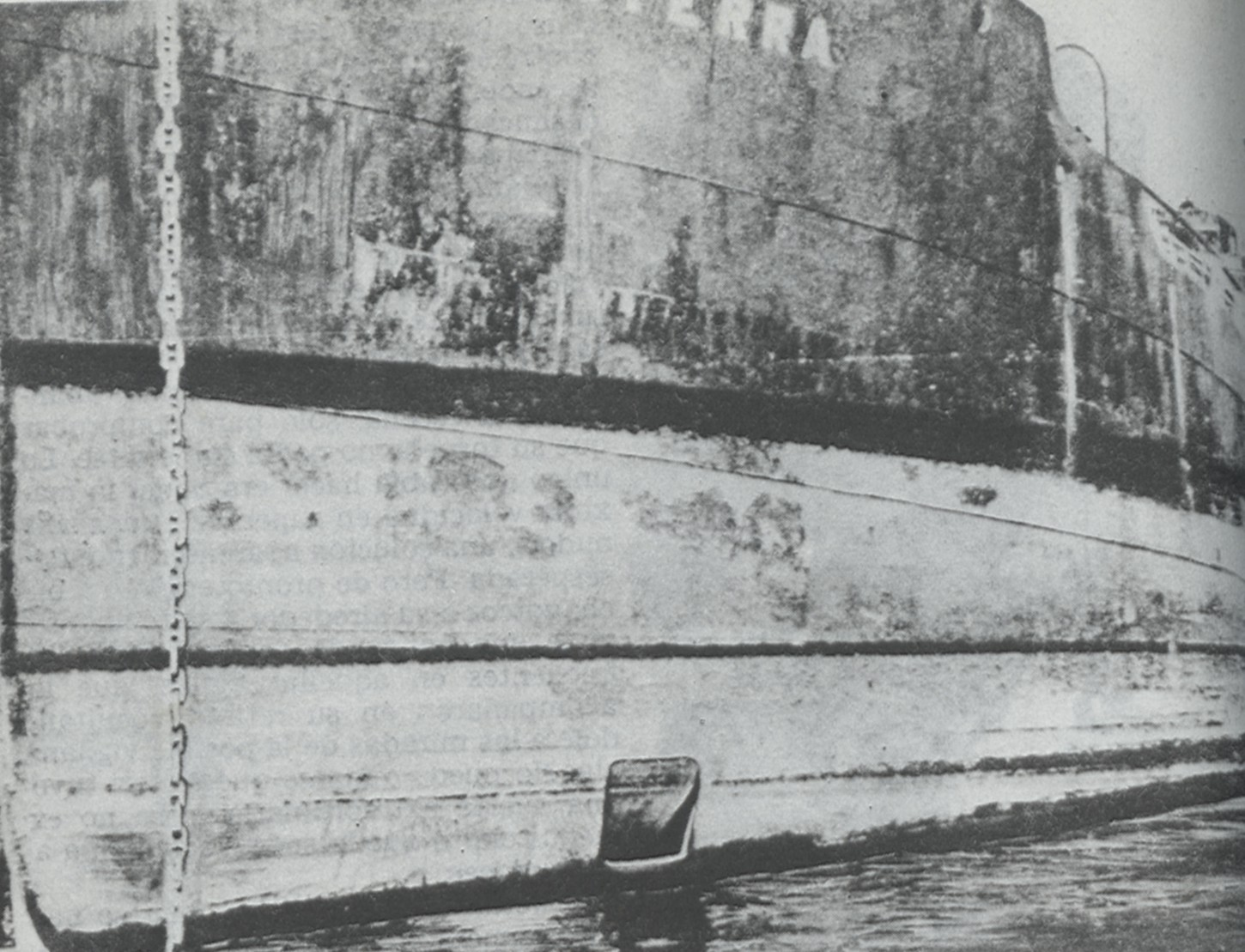
Olterra's hidden hatch

At the same time, another officer of the Italian special unit, Lieutenant Licio Visintini, a veteran of submarine incursions against the "Rock", learned about Olterra and conceived the idea of a secret mother ship for the maiali. Maiale (literally "pig") is the Italian nickname for the human torpedoes. Under the pretext of raising the ship to sell it to a Spanish owner, a team of members of the Decima, disguised as Italian civilian workers, took control of the tanker. The ship was towed to Algeciras, where "repairs" were started. The Italian Navy personnel were helped by two civilian members of the crew. They had remained on board the half sunken oiler along with a Spanish guard for more than two years, to protect the rights of the Italian company which owned Olterra.

Once at docks, some of Olterra's cargo holds and a boiler room were modified by Visintini's men into a workshop for the assembling and maintenance of human torpedoes. An improvized observation post was also mounted on the forecastle to watch the Bay of Gibraltar and the Allied ships at anchor there. A scene of civilian sailors working to overhaul the ship was meanwhile set up for the outsiders, to deceive the British and Spanish authorities. The torpedoes (in spare parts) and other equipment were smuggled into Spain by men of the Decima under the pretense of being materials for the 'works' on board Olterra. A sliding hatch was opened with a cutting torch six feet below the waterline. This would be the exit of the manned torpedoes, which would launch their attacks from the flooding bilge, right beneath the workshop. The special unit in charge of the operations was named Squadriglia Ursa Major, after the constellation.

== First incursion ==
By the end of the autumn of 1942, Olterra was ready. The workshop works were completed and all the supplies smuggled from Italy had reached Spain without raising suspicion. On 6 December 1942, after taking part in Operation Torch, a naval squadron consisting of the battleship HMS Nelson, the battlecruiser HMS Renown, the aircraft carriers HMS Furious and HMS Formidable and a number of escort units entered Gibraltar. Visintini planned a three maiali mission, each carrying two divers; the leading torpedo, driven by Visintini and Petty Officer Giovanni Magro, the second by 2nd Lieutenant Cella and Sergeant Leone and the third by Midshipman Gerolamo Manisco and Petty Officer Varini. The targets were in the following order, for Visintini, Nelson, for Manisco, Formidable and for Cella, Furious.

The assault craft departed from Olterra during the early hours of 8 December. At 2:15 a.m., the first human torpedo reached the area of the boom defenses. The motor launches and sentries inside the British base were quietly alert, conscious of the danger of a potential attack on the fleet at anchor. After the summer incursions of combat swimmers an underwater bomb disposal unit (Lieutenant Lionel Crabb) had been sent to Gibraltar. A pattern of depth charges was dropped by the motor barges at three minute intervals. The craft of Visintini and Magro was apparently hit by one of the charges and destroyed when they were trying to find a breach in the steel net protecting the harbor. Their bodies were recovered by the British some days later and buried at sea with full honors. The second "pig" was uncovered by a searchlight. After a long chase by anti-submarine boats, the Italian crew scuttled their craft and took shelter on board an American freighter. They discarded their swimsuits before submitting themselves to Gibraltar authorities.

The last manned torpedo was caught in the middle of the general alarm across the stronghold but managed to slip beneath the waters and fool the submarine chasers. The copilot, Leone, went missing during the pursuit and was never found; Cella abandoned the craft elsewhere, thinking that he was still near Gibraltar or stranded close to the Spanish coast. With the idea of becoming a prisoner of war or being arrested and interned by Spanish authorities in mind, Cella surfaced, only to find that he was just a few meters away from Olterra. His torpedo was recovered by the Italians the following day. The two divers captured by the British told their interrogators that the attack was launched by submarine, deceiving Allied intelligence. The first human torpedo mission ended in failure.

== Second incursion ==
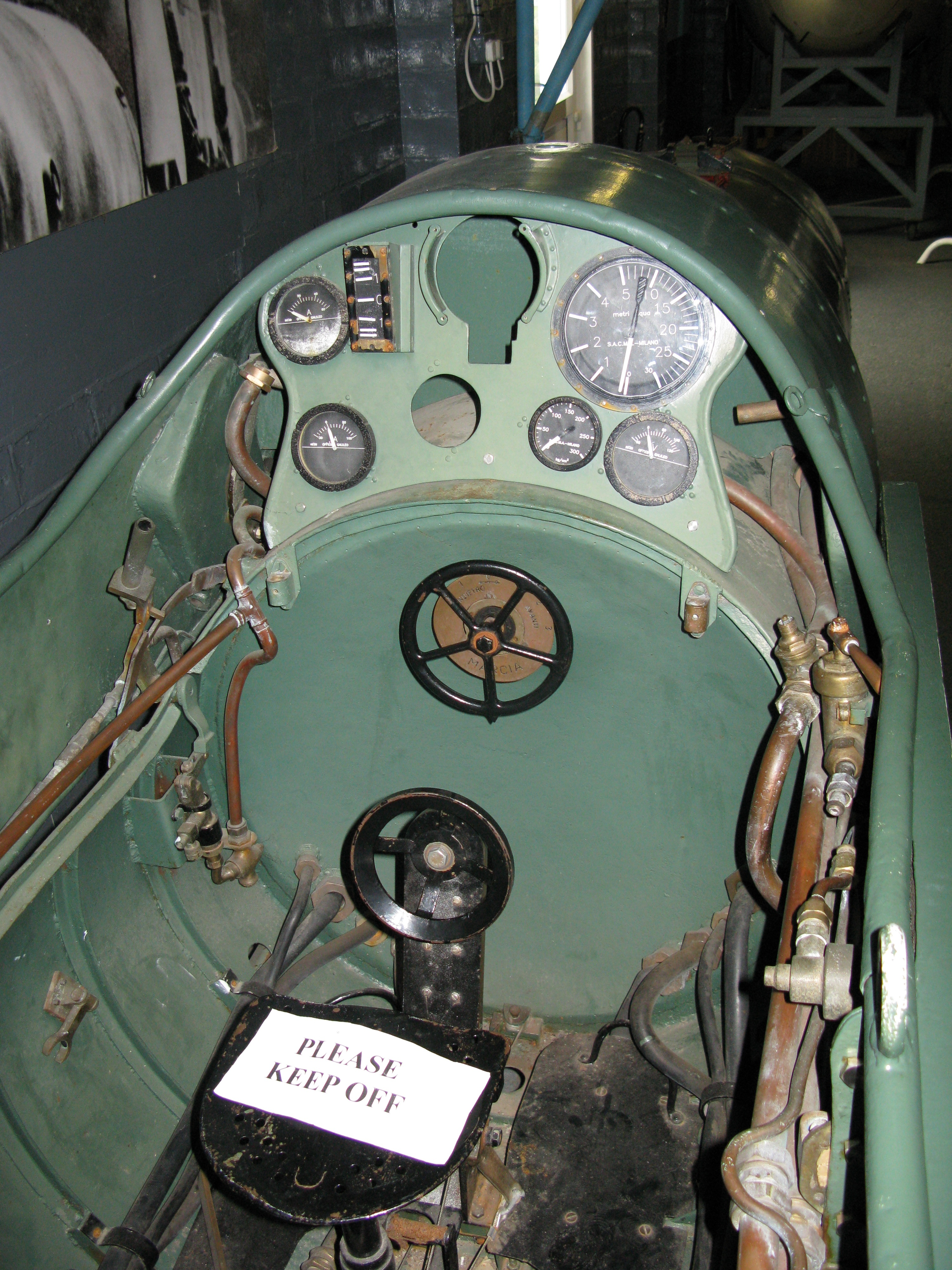
Cockpit of a maiale.

After the death of Visintini, Lieutenant Ernesto Notari took charge of Ursa Major on board Olterra. Replacements of personnel and materials were also sent from Italy. Owing to the improvements in the boom defenses, the next missions were planned against transport and cargo ships in the anchorage area around the naval base. The end of the war in North Africa and the subsequent Allied landings on Sicily also made the attacks on merchant ships a priority. In May 1943, Commander Junio Valerio Borghese, of Scirè, was appointed commander of the Decima. On the night of the 8/9 May was chosen for the next assault, taking advantage of the bad weather and the phase of the moon.

Lieutenant Notari, along with his second, Petty Officer Ario Lazzari, was the head of another three-torpedo wave heading for Gibraltar. The second human torpedo was manned by Lieutenant Tadini and Petty Officer Mattera and the third by Second Lieutenant Cella and Petty Officer Montalenti. To divert any British suspicion from Olterra, the targets were merchant ships at anchor in the farthest point from Algeciras. The gale that was raging at the time hampered the mission, because the current forced them to dive around the targets before they could attach the limpet mines to the hulls. At dawn, all the Italian craft reached their mother ship safely.

They had mined the American Liberty ship Pat Harrison (7,000 GRT) and the British freighters Mahsud (7,500 GRT) and Camerata (4,875 GRT). When the charges exploded, the American transport was severely damaged and became a total loss and an American sailor was killed by the blast. Mahsud rested on the bottom with much of the ship still above the water line, while Camerata was sunk. To mislead the British into thinking of combat swimmers instead of manned torpedoes, members of the Italian secret service scattered diving equipment along the shore. The second attempt from Olterra had been a stunning success.

== Last mission ==
Image of Thorshøvdi broken in two at Gibraltar.

On 25 July, a putsch removed Mussolini from power, a signal that Italy was on the brink of collapse. The course of the war and the political changes were no deterrent for the Decima MAS, which continued to plan and execute attacks on Allied shipping in all fronts. On 10 June, the unit was awarded the Medaglia d'oro as a tribute to their deeds. On the night of 3 August 1943, the Ursa Major carried out the last operation against Gibraltar. Three craft left Olterra in search of three transport ships at anchor in the bay. Notari led the "pigs" close to the Spanish coast to avoid the searchlights aimed at open sea. His second man was Petty Officer Andrea Gianoli, whose training on piloted torpedoes was poor. While the crew was clamping the explosive charge to the keel of a Liberty ship, their torpedo went out of control. Notari opened the diving valves and the "pig" suddenly crash dived to a depth of 34 m (112 ft). Then, the craft surfaced just a few feet from their intended victim.

Half conscious and with no trace of his companion, Notari tried to fix the mechanical problems developed by his torpedo but the diving mechanism was disabled. Notari managed to sneak out at full speed, helped by a school of porpoises that covered his wake; Gianoli being left behind. After waiting two hours on the rudder of the ship, he shouted for help. Once Gianoli was taken on board, a motor launch carrying a member of Crabb's diving unit was called to the scene. There was little doubt that the ship, Harrison Grey Otis (7,700 GRT) had been mined. The warhead blew up just seconds before the British diver, Petty Officer Bell, could put his foot on the water. One sailor was killed and eight others were seriously injured. Like her sister ship Pat Harrison in May, Otis was declared a constructive total loss. Two other Allied ships were also rocked by explosions at the same time, about 4:00 a.m. on 4 August. The Norwegian Thorshøvdi, of 9,900 GRT was broken in two by the blast, while the British Stanridge (6,000 GRT) sank in shallow water. The last mission of the Ursa Major destroyed 23,000 GRT of Allied shipping.

== Aftermath ==
Italy submitted to Allied terms on 8 September 1943. The war was over, this time for good, for Olterra. Until then, the British in Gibraltar had no proof to link the presence of the tanker at Algeciras with the raids on their ships,

We never found any proof of the part played by the Olterra in this affair. From British Naval Headquarters on Gibraltar we could see, with the naked eye, the Olterra's superstructure above the exterior mole at Algeciras. The possibility that the Olterra might be associated in some way with the attacks of human torpedoes did not escape us, but there was never the least visible evidence to suggest the actual nature of her participation.|Leon Goldsworthy

The Spanish authorities tried to hide the evidence but when Crabb's diving team boarded Olterra after the Armistice of Cassibile, they found spare parts from three torpedoes. This allowed them to reassemble a full manned torpedo, named Emily. The craft was lost after six trials at open seas. Crabb met some of his former enemies after the war, including the last commander of the Ursa Major, Lieutenant Notari.

Though the ship was broken up and disposed of in 1961, some bits of her outer plating, bearing the ship's name and a few portholes were salvaged and put into display at the Italian Naval Museum in La Spezia, along with other Decima Flotilla MAS artifacts (a barchino assault explosive motor boat and a maiale manned torpedo).

In 2021, the shipyard T. Mariotti of Genoa received the assignment from the Italian Navy for the construction of a submarine rescue ship which bears the name of Olterra; the vessel is also conceived to support Italian naval special forces.

== See also ==
- Decima MAS
- Human torpedo
- Military history of Gibraltar during World War II
- Spain in World War II

== Bibliography ==
- Borghese, Valerio (1995). Sea Devils: Italian Navy Commandos in World War II. Naval Institute Press. ISBN 1-55750-072-X.
- Bragadin, Marc'Antonio (1957). The Italian Navy in World War II, United States Naval Institute, Annapolis. ISBN 0-405-13031-7.
- Breuer, William (2001). Daring Missions of World War II. J. Wiley. ISBN 0-471-40419-5
- Cocchia, Aldo (1958). The Hunters and the Hunted. United States Naval Institute, Annapolis. ISBN 0-405-13030-9.
- Greene, Jack & Massignani, Alessandro (2004).The Black Prince and the Sea Devils: The Story of Valerio Borghese and the Elite Units of the Decima MAS. Da Capo Press. ISBN 0-306-81311-4.
- Longo, Luigi Emilio (1991). "Reparti speciali" italiani nella seconda guerra mondiale: 1940–1943. (Italian special units in the Second World War: 1940–1943) (in Italian) Mursia. ISBN 88-425-0734-2.
- O'Donnell, Patrick K. (2006). Operatives, Spies, and Saboteurs: The Unknown Story of World War II's OSS. Kensington Publishing Corporation. New York ISBN 978-0-74-323572-3
- Pugh, Marshall (1956). Frogman: Commander Crabb's Story. Scribner's, New York OCLC 1280137}
- Schofield, Williams, Carisella P. (2004). Frogmen: First Battles. Branden Books. Boston, MA ISBN 0-8283-2088-8.
