= Vincent-Froideville =

Commune in Bourgogne-Franche-Comté, France

- Commune
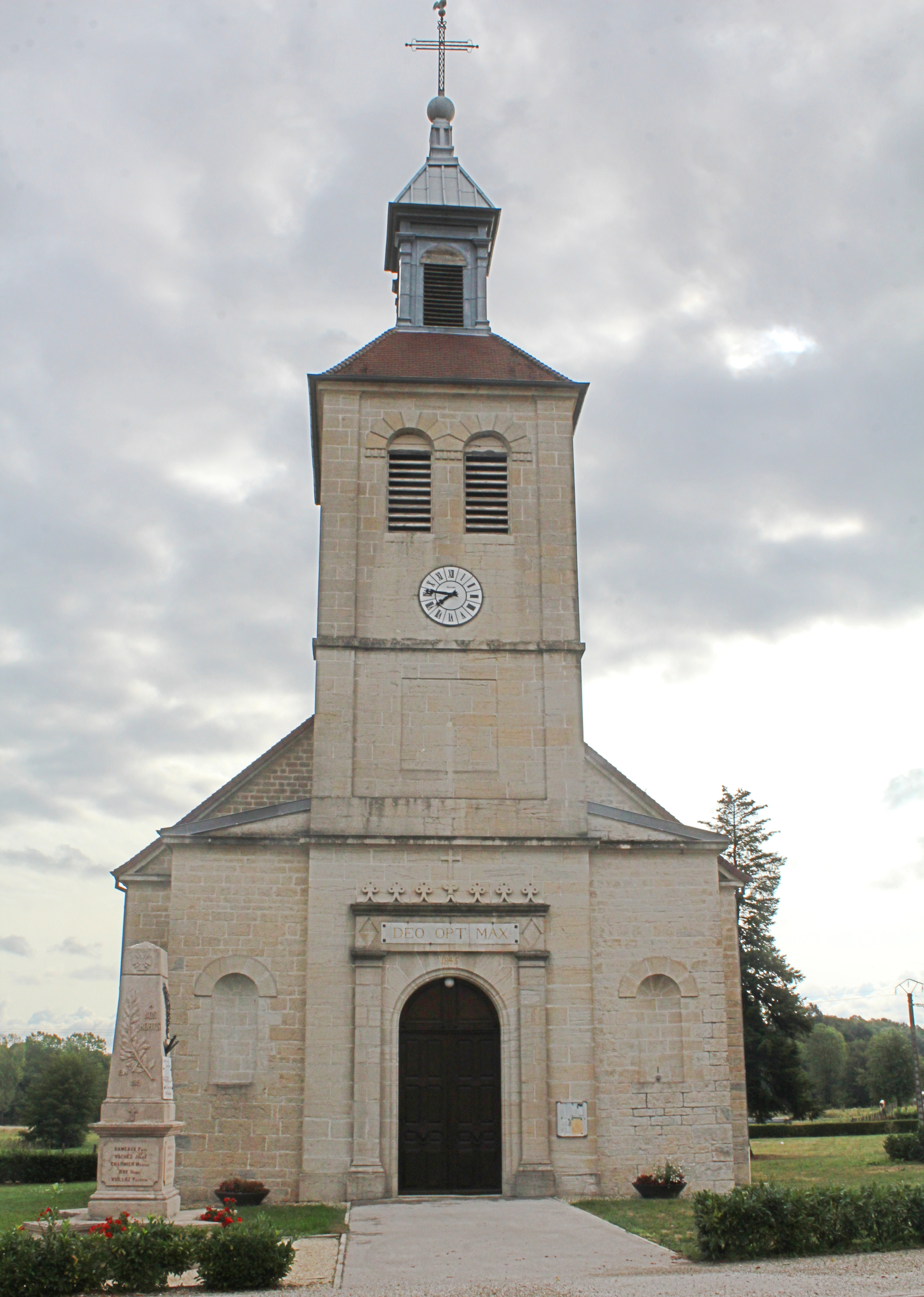
- The church in Vincent-Froideville
- Location of Vincent-Froideville
- Location within France Location within Bourgogne-Franche-Comté
- Coordinates: 46°47′02″N 5°29′20″E
- Country: France
- Region: Bourgogne-Franche-Comté
- Department: Jura
- Arrondissement: Lons-le-Saunier
- Canton: Bletterans

Government
  - Mayor (2020–2026): Alexandre Mulat
- Area^{1}: 11.69 km^{2} (4.51 sq mi)
- Population (2023): 381
  - Density: 32.6/km^{2} (84.4/sq mi)
- Time zone: UTC+01:00 (CET)
  - Summer (DST): UTC+02:00 (CEST)
- INSEE/Postal code: 39577 /39230
- ^{1} French Land Register data, which excludes lakes, ponds, glaciers > 1 km^{2} (0.386 sq mi or 247 acres) and river estuaries.

Vincent-Froideville (French pronunciation: [vɛ̃sɑ̃ fʁwadvil]) is a commune in the Jura department of eastern France. The municipality was established on 1 April 2016 and consists of the former communes of Vincent and Froideville.

== See also ==
- Communes of the Jura department
