= Visentin =

Visentin is an Italian surname from Veneto, derived from Venetian vixentin ('from Vicenza'). Notable people with the surname include:

- Carlos Visentín (1918–2017), Argentine water polo player
- David Visentin (born 1963), Canadian television host
- John Visentin (1962–2022), American business executive
- Louis Visentin, Canadian scientist
- Marcelo Visentín (1914–1998), Argentine water polo player
- Mark Visentin (born 1992), Canadian ice hockey player
- Michele Visentin (born 1991), Italian rugby union player
- Noemi Visentin (born 2000), Italian football player
- Roberto Visentin (born 1953), Italian politician
- Santiago Visentin (born 1999), Argentine football player
- Umberto Visentin (1909–1994), Italian football player and manager

== See also ==
- Col Visentin, a mountain in Veneto, Italy
- Vicentino (disambiguation)
- Visentini
- Visintin
- Visintini
