= Mario Visintini =

Italian military pilot

- c. 1936
- Born: Mario Visentin; 26 April 1913; Parenzo, Austria-Hungary
- Died: 11 February 1941 (aged 27); Mount Bizen, Nefasit, Eritrea
- Burial place: Asmara, Eritrea
- Military career
- Allegiance: Italy
- Branch: Regia Aeronautica; Aviazione Legionaria
- Service years: 1936 – 1941
- Rank: Capitano
- Nickname: “cacciatore scientifico”
- Units: 25ª Squadriglia of XVI° Gruppo "La Cucaracha", 413ª Squadriglia, 412ª Squadriglia
- Conflicts: Spanish Civil War; World War II
- Awards: Medaglia d'Oro al Valor Militare; Medaglia di Bronzo al Valor Militare

Mario Visintini, MOVM, (26 April 1913 – 11 February 1941) was an Italian military pilot, the first Regia Aeronautica flying ace of World War II. In recognition of his flying skill and meticulousness, Visintini was nicknamed cacciatore scientifico (scientific hunter).

Visintini was the top-scoring pilot of all belligerent air forces in Eastern Africa (Africa Orientale) and the top biplane fighter ace of World War II; he achieved all his air victories flying the Fiat CR.42 biplane. He is credited with 16 confirmed air victories (20, according to other sources) and five probable, plus two victories achieved during the Spanish Civil War serving in the Aviazione Legionaria.

== Early years ==
Mario Visentin (later changed to "Visintini") was born in Parenzo d'Istria, now Poreč in Croatia, on 26 April 1913. (Note: Lieutenant Licio Visintini, Mario's brother, was also a highly decorated veteran of the Italian Navy in World War II.) His father was an agricultural expert. Visintini tried to enter the Regia Accademia Aeronautica but did not pass the medical examination because he was declared "too weak and susceptible". So he enrolled in the Faculty of Agricultural Sciences at "Università di Bologna". Subsequently, in spring 1936, he entered the air training centre at Caproni di Taliedo. Transferred to Lecce, Visintini followed the usual training program. He gained his civilian pilot's licence on 30 May 1936 and his military wings in September 1936. Two months later, he qualified as a military pilot at Grottaglie, Taranto, on Breda Ba.25s and Fiat CR.20s. With the rank of Sottotenente, he was posted to the 91ª Squadriglia, 10°Gruppo, 4° Stormo, at Gorizia, in northeast Italy, where he trained on Fiat CR.30s and Fiat CR.32s.

In November 1937, Visintini volunteered for service in the Spanish Civil War. He was attached to 25ªSquadriglia of XVI° Gruppo "La Cucaracha", then equipped with Fiat CR.32s. In Spain, Visintini distinguished himself as an outstanding pilot, claiming a number of kills. At least two of his victories are confirmed. On 24 August 1938 he shot down a Russian Polikarpov I-15 fighter aircraft, while, on 5 September 1938, he claimed a Polikarpov I-16 of 1ª Escuadrilla Chatos, over Venta de los Campesinos. In October 1938, after 330 hours of combat, Visintini returned to Italy, rejoining 4° Stormo. For his service in Spain, he was decorated with a first Medaglia d'Argento al valor militare(Silver Medal for military valour). (Note: Visintini may have scored as many as four victories over Spain but incomplete records have hampered research into his combat history.) In September 1939, he was promoted to Servizio Permanente Effettivo.

== East Africa ==
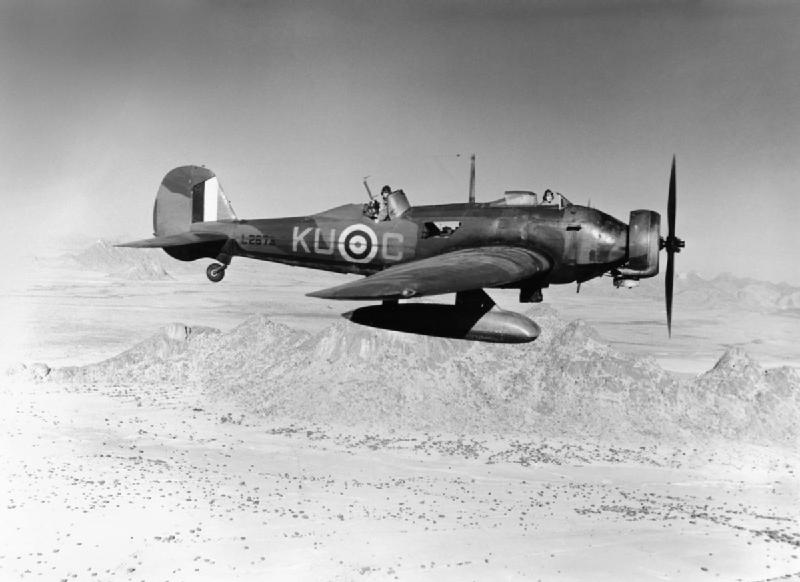
A Wellesley Mk.I of no. 47 Squadron RAF (as can be seen by the code letters KU) over the desert - Visintini shot down several of these aircraft

In April 1940, Visintini, was transferred to 412ª Squadriglia. This unit had, in its ranks, a good number of ex-4° Stormo (the Royal Italian Air Force's elite unit) pilots and - after only one year of operations - produced five aces. On 12 June, two days after Italy entered World War II, flying from Gura, he claimed a Vickers Wellesley bomber K7747 of No. 223 Squadron RAF (crewed by F/O Ross & Cpl. Stevenson, the plane returned but crashed when landing). It was the first of his 16 air victories during the conflict, in Eastern Africa Two days later, on 14 June 1940, he intercepted a pair of Vickers Wellesleys from No. 14 Squadron RAF, en route to bomb Massawa. Visintini shot down aircraft K7743, flown by Pilot Officer Reginald Patrick Blenner Plunkett. Plunkett fell in the Red Sea and was never found despite a search mission undertaken. During a reconnaissance flight over Dekemhare (Italianized as Decamerè), on 3 July 1940 (according to other authors, on 4 July), Visintini shot down another Wellesley (L2652), from No. 14 Squadron, flown by 26-year-old Flying Officer Samuel Gustav Soderholm (RAF No. 40194), who was killed in the crash.

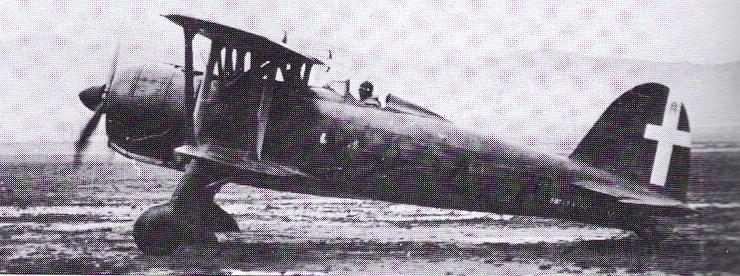
A Fiat CR.42 in Regia Aeronautica the type that Visintini flew; he was credited with 16 confirmed air victories and five probables, all of them achieved with the CR.42

In July 1940, Visintini shot down several aircraft. On 12 July, 11 Wellesleys from 14 and 47 Squadrons attacked Massawa airfield. Mario Visintini and Sergente Luigi Baron intercepted them, and Visintini shot down Sergeant Frederick “Freddy” Nelson (RAF No. 516778) of 47 Squadron, in K8520 at 15:00. The pilot was killed, while the rest of the crew was taken prisoner. Visintini and Baron were credited with another "probable" but in fact, the Wellesley I (L2667) of 47 Squadron managed to return to its base, but was so damaged that it was considered written off. On 29 July, he was decorated with a second Medaglia d'Argento al valor militare. He claimed another Wellesley, possibly on 26 August (K7731). On 1 September 1940, Visintini shared the kill of another Vickers monoplane with two other pilots. The downed aircraft was a Wellesley (L2669) from No. 14 Squadron, flown by Sergeant Norris on a photographic reconnaissance sortie over Harmil Island, when it was intercepted and attacked by Fiat fighters, scrambled from Massawa. The Wellesley crash-landed on the island, the crew being taken prisoner. According to other sources that was a solo kill, qualifying Visintini as an ace.

Visintini had his first double kill, on 13 October. At 16:30, two Bristol Blenheim MkI bombers of 45 Squadron went to bomb Dekemhare, but were soon attacked by him. After having placed himself, for mere challenge, exactly between the bombers, so that neither of them could fire at him without hitting its companion, he soon moved to a blind spot outside the bombers' defensive fields of fire and shot down both in a matter of seconds. The two Blenheims fell near Sageneyti, a hamlet some 15 kilometres East of Dekemhare. All the crews were killed: 25-years-old Flight Officer Gordon Cyril Butler Woodroffe (RAF No. 39837), 24-years-old Sergeant Eric Bromley Ryles (RAF No. 581161), Sergeant Albert Alfred Meadows (RAF No. 612422), and 28-years-old Pilot Officer George Angus Cockayne (RAF No. 41779), 24-years-old Sergeant Trevor Ascott Ferris (RAF No. 566370), Sergeant Robert William Reader (RAF No. 548764).

On 6 November, the British forces in Sudan launched an offensive against the Italian Gallabat and Metemma Forts, just across the border. The CR.42s led by Capitano Raffi and "ace" Mario Visintini from 412ª Squadriglia clashed with No. 1 SAAF Squadron Gloster Gladiators and shot down 24-year-old Flight Lieutenant Kenneth Howard Savage (RAF no. 37483) (L7614), Pilot Officer Kirk (K7969) and forced Pilot Officer J. Hamlyn to crash-land his aircraft (L7612). Meanwhile, Major Schalk van Schalkwyk (N5855) of No. 1 SAAF Squadron was attacked by Fiat biplanes that put his aircraft in flames and forced him to bail out but he did not survive. Captain Brian Boyle took off to van Schalkwyk's assistance but was himself immediately attacked and wounded, being forced to crash-land. That day, around midday, while trying to attack Caproni Ca.133 bombers, another flight of Gladiators was intercepted. Flying Officer Haywood (K7977) was hit and crashed in flames. South Africans claimed to have shot down two Fiats, but only Sottotenente Rosmino's aircraft was hit, returning with his parachute pack riddled with bullets. Two or three of these victories were credited to Capitano Visintini.

On 26 November, six Blenheim IV bombers of 14 Squadron went to attack the railway station at Nefasit, a town near Asmara on the road to Massawa. Visintini, with two more pilots, intercepted them at 08:30, over the island of Dessei. The aircraft (R3593) of Flight Officer MacKenzie was so damaged that he had to force-land on the coast north of Massawa. The air victory seems to have been credited to Visintini.

On 4 December, Tenente Visintini claimed to have shot down a Blenheim over the Red Sea. This was Blenheim IV R2770 of 14 Squadron, piloted by Flying Officer Thomas G. Rhodes, that failed to return by a reconnaissance mission. The crew was MIA.

On 12 December 1940, five CR.42s of 412ª Squadriglia and a Savoia-Marchetti S.M.79 attacked the Goz Regeb airstrip (west of river Atbara, in Sudan), the home base of No. 237 Squadron RAF B Flight. They destroyed four Hawker Hardys (K4053, K4308, K4055 and K4307) parked on the ground, but the Sudan Defence Force defending the base hit the Fiat of Capitano Antonio Raffi, who was forced to land to the east of Aroma. Visintini landed and helped Raffi aboard. With both pilots tightly packed into the cockpit, Visintini flew back to the Barentu base.

Visintini was promoted to Capitano and Commander of 412ª Squadriglia on 16 January 1941 and on 11 February 1941, he claimed a Hawker Hurricane, over Keren. The Hawker monoplane was probably an aircraft from the No. 1 SAAF Squadron that had 11 fighter aircraft on patrol that day. Two of the British aircraft clashed with Fiat CR.42s, and Lieutenant S. de K. Viljoen had to force-land his stricken fighter. After the combat, Visintini landed on his airfield, refuelled and took off again, searching for his faithful wingman, Luigi Baron (an ace with a score of 12 kills, at the end of the war), who had been forced down by a storm. Because of the same inclement weather, Visintini's Fiat crashed into Mount Bizen, near Nefasit, about 24 kilometres from Asmara, Eritrea.

== Victories ==
Tomb of Visintini in the Italian Monumental Cemetery, Asmara, Eritrea

According to Shores in 1983, Visintini shot down 20 enemy aircraft. During 50 air battles, he downed at least five Blenheim bombers, a greater number of Wellesley bombers, almost certainly three Gladiator fighters and a Hurricane, plus 32 enemy aircraft (alone and shared with others pilots) destroyed on the airfields of Gedaref, Goz Regeb (Sudan) and Agordat.

== Honours and tributes ==
Visintini was posthumously awarded a Medaglia d'Oro al Valor Militare (Gold Medal of Military Valor), one of Argento (Silver) (one more in Spain) and one of Bronzo (Bronze).

His successes, his charm and his demise, during a gallant attempt to help his comrades, made Visintini a legend at the time. In 1942, a volume of the series Eroi della nostra guerra (Heroes of Our War), entitled Il Pilota solitario ("The Lonely Pilot"), was dedicated to him.

Postwar, the Gruppo Giovanile Mario Visintini named in honour of Visintini was a youth group in Eritrea that operated from 1950 to 1957.

The Aeroporto di Rivolto "MOVM Cap. Mario Visintini" is a small regional civil airport located four km southwest of Udine, Italy.
