= Froideville, Jura =

Froideville
- Part of Vincent-Froideville
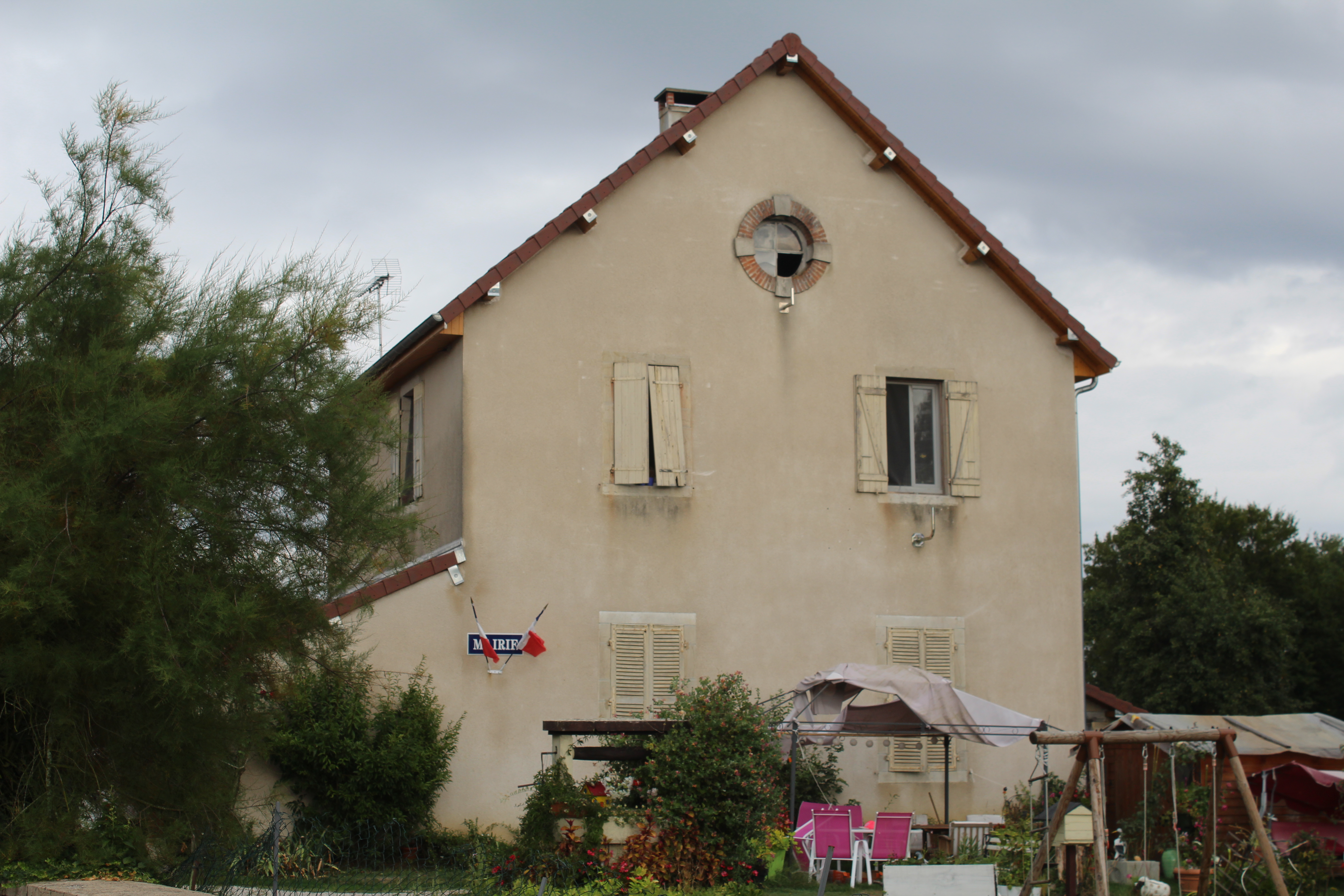
- Town hall
- Location of Froideville
- Location within France Location within Bourgogne-Franche-Comté
- Coordinates: 46°48′38″N 5°29′09″E
- Country: France
- Region: Bourgogne-Franche-Comté
- Department: Jura
- Arrondissement: Lons-le-Saunier
- Canton: Bletterans
- Commune: Vincent-Froideville
- Area^{1}: 2.97 km^{2} (1.15 sq mi)
- Highest elevation: 224 m (735 ft)
- Lowest elevation: 199 m (653 ft)
- Population (2023): 62
  - Density: 21/km^{2} (54/sq mi)
- Time zone: UTC+01:00 (CET)
  - Summer (DST): UTC+02:00 (CEST)
- Postal code: 39230
- ^{1} French Land Register data, which excludes lakes, ponds, glaciers > 1 km^{2} (0.386 sq mi or 247 acres) and river estuaries.

Froideville (French pronunciation: [fʁwadvil]) is a former commune in the Jura department in Franche-Comté in eastern France. On 1 April 2016, it was merged into the new commune of Vincent-Froideville.

== See also ==
- Communes of the Jura department
