= Marshall Pugh =

British journalist and author (born 1925)

Marshall Pugh (1925-1976) was a British journalist and author. He wrote a book called Commander Crabb based on the true story of a British officer who learned deep sea diving to thwart Italian frogmen who were sabotaging British naval forces. He later adapted it into a movie called The Silent Enemy which was released in 1958. He also wrote fiction, including the novel "A Wilderness of Monkeys" which was published in 1958. A list of his work is available at https://openlibrary.org/a/OL1947915A/Marshall-Pugh
