= Vicentino =

Vicentino may refer to:

== Places ==
- Barbarano Vicentino, Vicenza, Italy
- Bolzano Vicentino, Vicenza, Italy
- Camisano Vicentino, Vicenza, Italy
- Cornedo Vicentino, Vicenza, Italy
- Fara Vicentino, Vicenza, Italy
- Lugo Vicentino, Vicenza, Italy
- Marano Vicentino, Vicenza, Italy
- Mason Vicentino, Vicenza, Italy
- Montebello Vicentino, Vicenza, Italy
- Montorso Vicentino, Vicenza, Italy
- Nogarole Vicentino, Vicenza, Italy
- Quinto Vicentino, Vicenza, Italy

== People ==
- Vicentino (surname), people with the name Vicentino

== See also ==
- Vicentina (disambiguation)
