= Puerto Vicentini =

Coordinates: 27°24′39″S 59°03′07″W

- Municipality and village
- Interactive map of Puerto Vicentini
- Country: Argentina
- Province: Chaco Province
- Time zone: UTC−3 (ART)

Puerto Vicentini is a village and municipality in Chaco Province in northern Argentina.
