= Jorge Visintini =

Argentine professional footballer

Personal information
- Full name: Jorge Luis Visintini
- Date of birth: 8 September 1988 (age 38)
- Place of birth: San Miguel de Tucumán, Argentina
- Height: 1.80 m (5 ft 11 in)
- Position: Midfielder

Team information
- Current team: San Martín Senior

Senior career*
Years	Team	Apps	(Gls)
- Tucumán Central
2010–2013	Atlético Concepción		
2013	Mitre	0	(0)
2013–2014	Atlético Concepción		
2014–2015	Deportivo Lastenia	14	(5)
2015	Concepción	14	(1)
2016	Unión Santiago	9	(2)
2016	Central Norte	15	(1)
2017–2019	Deportivo Riestra	16	(0)
2020–	Vélez de San Ramón	3	(0)
2022–	Deportivo la Merced	1	(0)
2022–	Club Atlético Amalia	16	(2)
- * Club domestic league appearances and goals as of 18:44, 17 September 2020 (UTC)

Jorge Luis Visintini (born 8 September 1988) is an Argentine professional footballer who plays as a midfielder for Vélez de San Ramón.

== Career ==
Visintini, after a spell with Tucumán Central, went to Torneo Argentino B with Atlético Concepción. He made sixty-nine appearances and netted six goals in four years, either side of a stint with Mitre in 2013. In 2014, Visintini joined Deportivo Lastenia. Two goals in fourteen games followed, prior to the midfielder agreeing a move to Torneo Federal A with Concepción of Tucumán in 2015. He made his bow in April versus Unión Aconquija, with his first goal coming in a loss to Américo Tesorieri. He featured in fourteen fixtures as they suffered relegation. Visintini split time in 2016 with Unión Santiago and Central Norte.

On 27 January 2017, Visintini agreed to join Deportivo Riestra of Primera B Metropolitana. Eleven appearances occurred as the club won promotion to Primera B Nacional, a competition he subsequently appeared four times in; as they were relegated back down. It was announced that the club would not renew his contract at the conclusion of 2018–19. In 2020, Visintini headed to Vélez de San Ramón.

== Career statistics ==
As of 17 September 2020.

Appearances and goals by club, season and competition
Club	Season	League			Cup		League Cup		Continental		Other		Total	
Club	Season	Division	Apps	Goals	Apps	Goals	Apps	Goals	Apps	Goals	Apps	Goals	Apps	Goals
Atletico concepcion	2012	Torneo Federal B	76	14	0	0					0	0	76	14
Deportivo Lastenia	2014	Torneo Federal B	14	2	0	0	—		—		0	0	14	2
Concepción	2015	Torneo Federal A	14	1	0	0	—		—		0	0	14	1
Unión Santiago	2016	Torneo Federal B	9	2	1	0	—		—		0	0	10	2
Central Norte	2016 (C)	Torneo Federal B	15	1	0	0	—		—		0	0	15	1
Deportivo Riestra	2016–17	Primera B Metropolitana	10	0	0	0	—		—		1 (Note: Appearance(s) in the Primera B Metropolitana play-offs)	0	11	0
Deportivo Riestra	2017–18	Primera B Nacional	4	0	0	0	—		—		0	0	4	0
Deportivo Riestra	2018–19	Primera B Metropolitana	2	0	0	0	—		—		0	0	2	0
Deportivo Riestra	Total		16	0	0	0	—		—		1	0	17	0
Vélez de San Ramón	2020	Torneo Amateur	3	0	0	0	—		—		0	0	3	0
Deportivo la Merced	2020	Torneo Amateur	5	0	0	1	—		—		0	0	3	0
Club Atlético Amalia	2022	Liga Tucumana	16	0	0	4	—		—		0	0	3	0
Career total			76	6	1	0	—		—		1	0	73	6
