= Vincent, Jura =

Vincent
- Part of Vincent-Froideville
- Location of Vincent
- Location within France Location within Bourgogne-Franche-Comté
- Coordinates: 46°47′09″N 5°29′31″E
- Country: France
- Region: Bourgogne-Franche-Comté
- Department: Jura
- Arrondissement: Lons-le-Saunier
- Canton: Bletterans
- Commune: Vincent-Froideville
- Area^{1}: 8.72 km^{2} (3.37 sq mi)
- Highest elevation: 247 m (810 ft)
- Lowest elevation: 202 m (663 ft)
- Population (2013): 317
  - Density: 36.4/km^{2} (94.2/sq mi)
- Time zone: UTC+01:00 (CET)
  - Summer (DST): UTC+02:00 (CEST)
- Postal code: 39230
- ^{1} French Land Register data, which excludes lakes, ponds, glaciers > 1 km^{2} (0.386 sq mi or 247 acres) and river estuaries.

Vincent (French pronunciation: [vɛ̃sɑ̃]) is a former commune in the Jura department in the Bourgogne-Franche-Comté region in eastern France. On 1 April 2016, it was merged into the new commune of Vincent-Froideville.

== Population ==
Historical population

Year	Pop.	±% p.a.
1831	544	—
1846	528	−0.20%
1872	492	−0.27%
1901	372	−0.96%
1926	297	−0.90%
1946	257	−0.72%
1962	214	−1.14%

Year	Pop.	±% p.a.
1968	192	−1.79%
1975	169	−1.81%
1982	163	−0.52%
1990	203	+2.78%
1999	226	+1.20%
2013	317	+2.45%

Source: EHESS and INSEE

== See also ==
- Communes of the Jura department
