= Vinzant Software =

Vinzant Software, Inc.
- Type: Private
- Industry: Software & Programming; IT Services
- Founded: 1987
- Headquarters: Valparaiso, Indiana, United States
- Key people: Sue Behnke (President and Entrepreneur); Bob Behnke (COO); Douglas McDowell (VP of Development)
- Products: Global ECS
- Website: www.vinzantsoftware.com

Vinzant Software is a privately held company headquartered in Valparaiso, Indiana. The company specializes in developing and marketing enterprise job scheduling software for various operating systems including Windows, Unix, Linux, IBM i, and MPE/ix.

== History ==
Initially founded as Vinzant, Inc. in 1987 by David Vinzant, the company first developed add-on programs for the SKYLINE property management software. In 1988, as client-server computing began to emerge, Vinzant, Inc. collaborated with Microsoft and Novell to create SQLFile, the first front-end interface for the Ashton-Tate/Microsoft SQL Server. This product was subsequently expanded to support DOS, OS/2, and Windows, providing a versatile development tool for accessing data stored in various SQL servers.

In 1990, Vinzant, Inc. released the SQLFile System for DOS, distributed worldwide as part of Novell's Client Server Starter Kit. The company was also selected by Oracle to develop the installation program for the Oracle Server for NetWare. Other notable SQL-based products developed by Vinzant, Inc. include the SQL BASIC Library and the SQL Server Connectivity Pack.

In the mid-1990s, Vinzant shifted its focus to the job scheduling and batch processing market, resulting in the development of the Event Control System (ECS). ECS was designed to provide centralized control for a network of DOS, OS/2, and Windows-based PCs. By 1999, ECS had been redesigned to support Unix and Linux systems, leading to the creation of the Global Event Control Server (Global ECS).

== Global ECS ==
Global ECS is Vinzant Software's primary product. It is an enterprise-level job scheduling tool. The software is managed from a single point using a Windows or browser-based client, Global ECS offers traditional time-based scheduling as well as event-driven triggers. This means that the user can define jobs to occur based on time, or another event.

== Implementations ==
Job scheduling and batch processing tools like Global ECS help manage data processing systems by automating operations. Common applications include scheduling file transfers, database updates, report generation, compilations, and backups. Global ECS is used by various industries, including financial services, government agencies, healthcare, retail, and manufacturing.

== Industry affiliations ==
- Apple Developer Connection
- HP Developer and Solution Partner Program
- Intel Software Partner Program
- Microsoft Developer Network
- Novell Developer Network
- Red Hat Developer Program
- SCO Developer Network
- SGI Global Developer Program
- Sun Developer Network

== See also ==
- Information Management
- Business Process Automation
- Job Scheduling
