= Italian submarine Scirè (1938) =

Italian submarine

Coordinates: 33°0′10″N 34°0′12″E

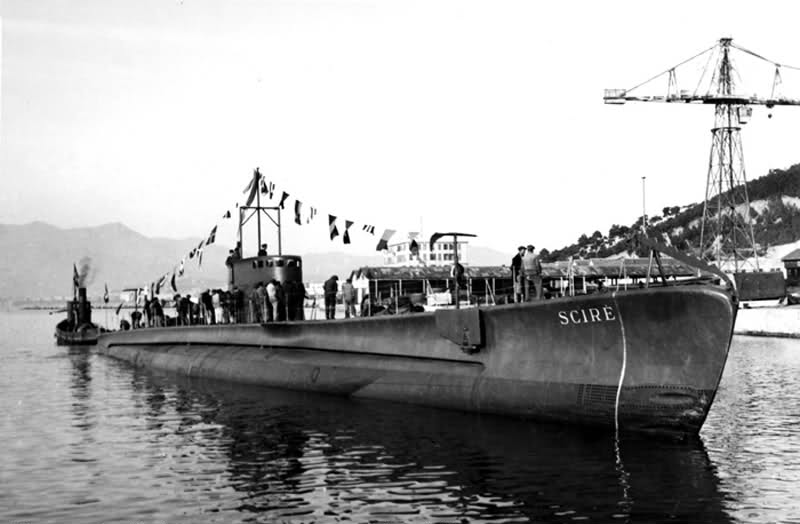
- RIN Scire

History

Kingdom of Italy
- Name: Scirè
- Namesake: Northern part of Ethiopia
- Builder: OTO, Muggiano
- Laid down: 30 January 1937
- Launched: 6 January 1938
- Completed: 25 March 1938
- Fate: Sunk, 10 August 1942

General characteristics
- Class & type: 600-Serie Adua-class submarine
- Displacement: 680 long tons (691 t) surfaced; 844 long tons (858 t) submerged
- Length: 60.18 m (197 ft 5 in) (oa)
- Beam: 6.45 m (21 ft 2 in)
- Draught: 4.6 m (15 ft 1 in)
- Propulsion: 2 × FIAT diesel engines; 2 × Marelli electric motors,
- Speed: 14 knots (26 km/h) surface; 7.5 knots (13.9 km/h) submerged
- Complement: 36 (4 officers + 32 non-officers and sailors)
- Armament: 6 × torpedo tubes (4 bow, 2 stern); 12 × 533 mm (21.0 in) torpedoes on board; 1 × 100 mm (4 in) / 47 caliber deck gun; (deck gun was removed in 1940 and 3 Human torpedo launchers were installed instead)

Italian submarine Scirè was an Adua-class submarine, built in the 1930s which served during World War II in the Regia Marina. It was named after a northern region of Ethiopia, at the time part of Italian East Africa.

== Design and description ==
The Adua-class submarines were essentially repeats of the preceding Perla class. They displaced 680 long tons (690 t) surfaced and 844 long tons (858 t) submerged. The submarines were 60.18 meters (197 ft 5 in) long, had a beam of 6.45 meters (21 ft 2 in) and a draft of 4.7 meters (15 ft 5 in).

For surface running, the boats were powered by two 600-brake-horsepower (447 kW) diesel engines, each driving one propeller shaft. When submerged, each propeller was driven by a 400-horsepower (298 kW) electric motor. They could reach 14 knots (26 km/h; 16 mph) on the surface and 7.5 knots (13.9 km/h; 8.6 mph) underwater. On the surface, the Adua class had a range of 3,180 nautical miles (5,890 km; 3,660 mi) at 10.5 knots (19.4 km/h; 12.1 mph), submerged, they had a range of 74 nmi (137 km; 85 mi) at 4 knots (7.4 km/h; 4.6 mph).

The boats were armed with six internal 53.3 cm (21.0 in) torpedo tubes, four in the bow and two in the stern. They were also armed with one 100 mm (4 in) deck gun for combat on the surface. The light anti-aircraft armament consisted of one or two pairs of 13.2 mm (0.52 in) machine guns.

== Construction and career ==
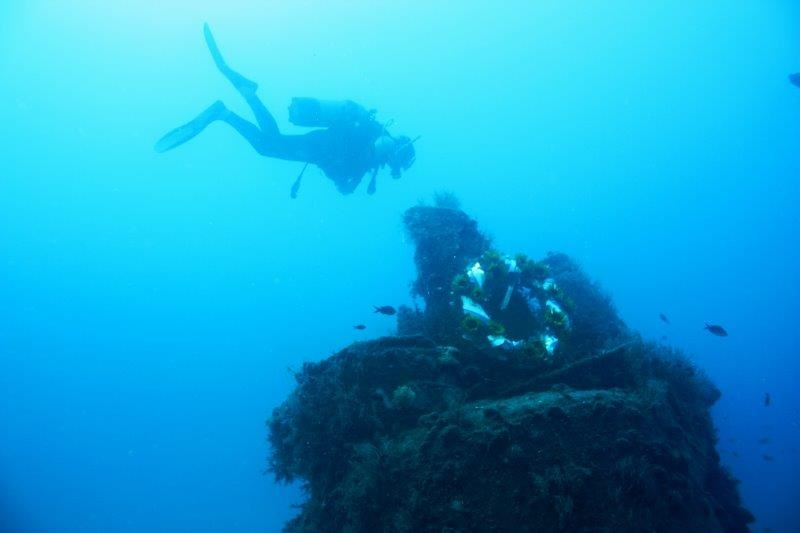
A diver leaves a wreath on top of the submarine's conning tower, 2002.

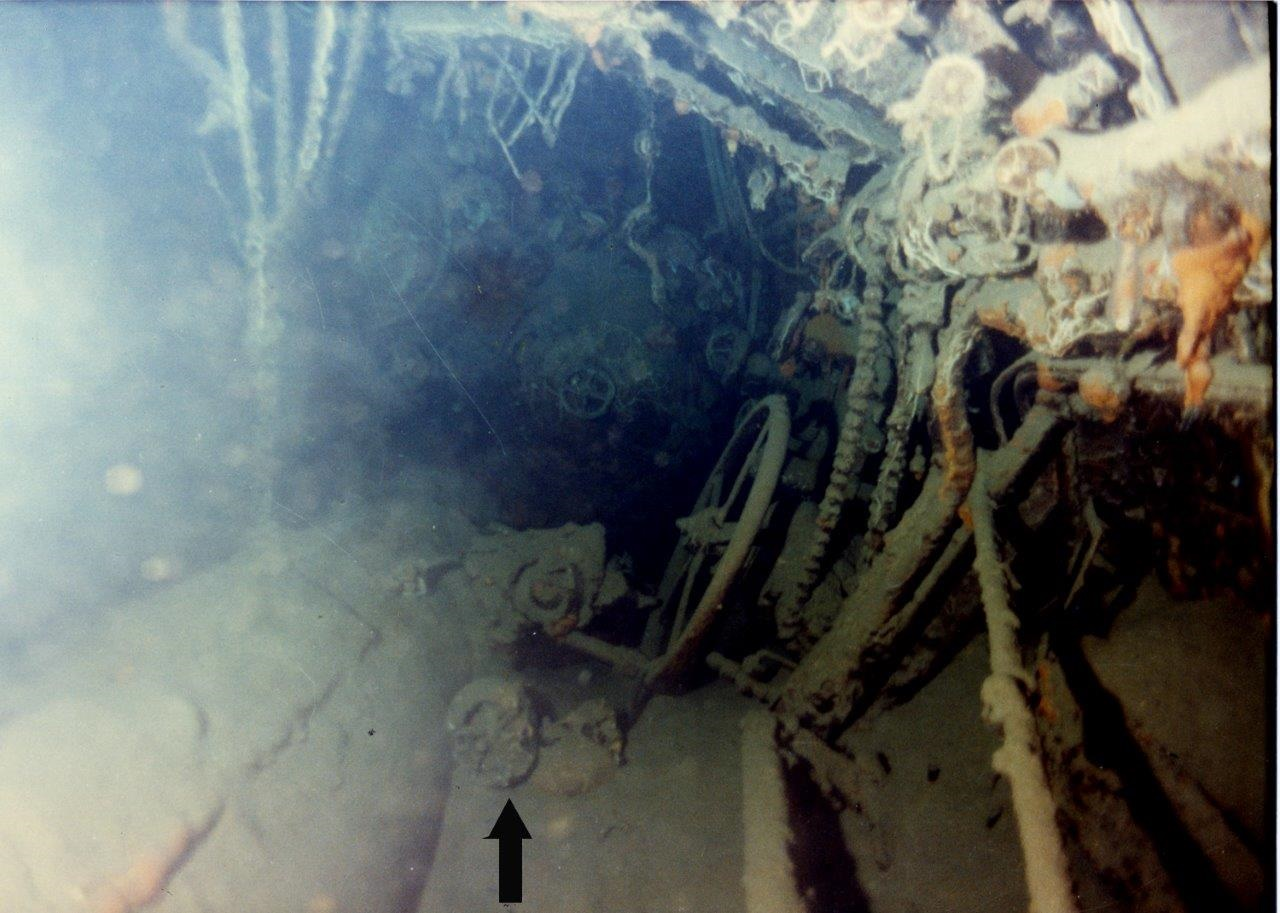
The torpedo room of Scirè, 1982. The skulls of two crewmen are visible.

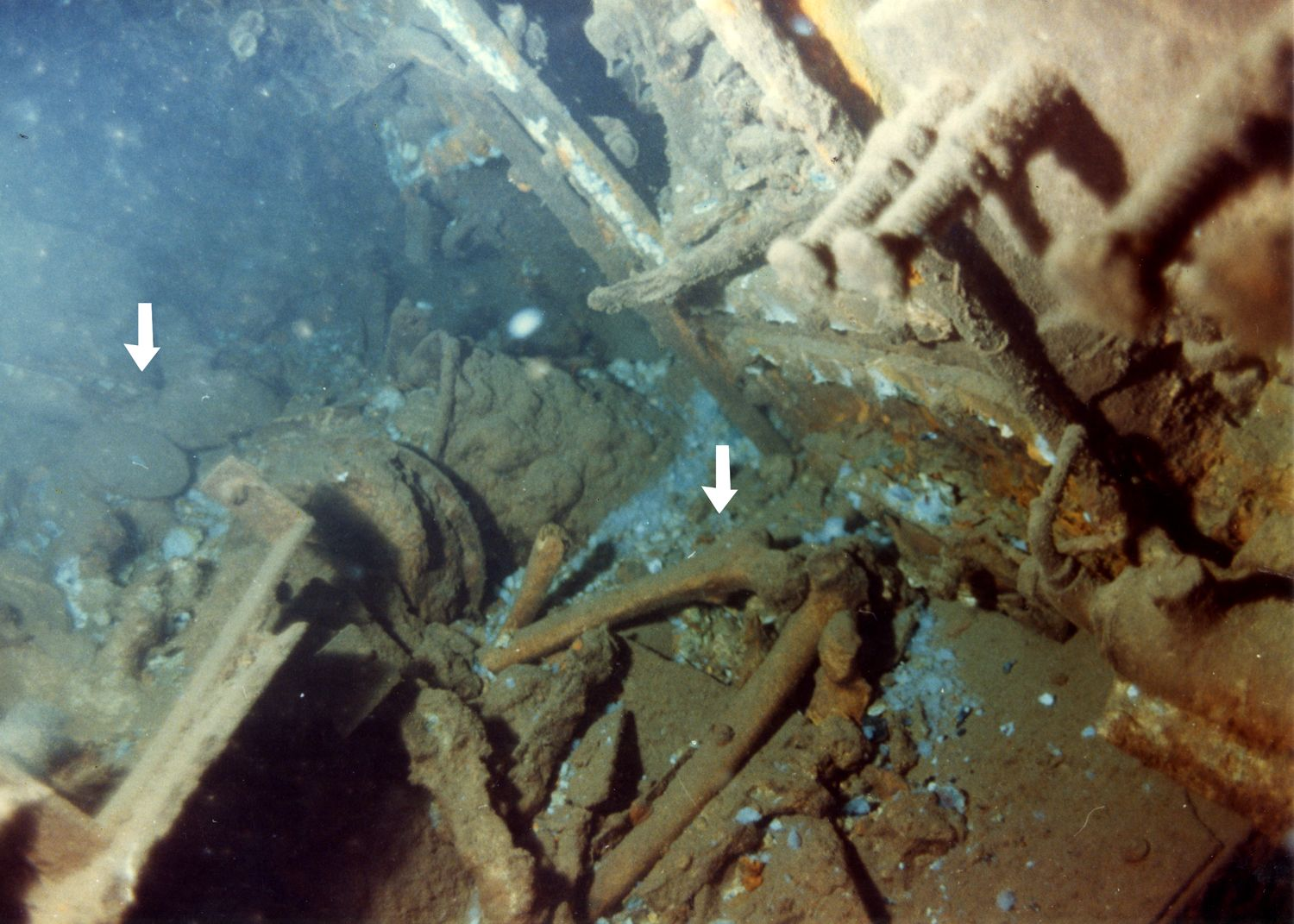
The engine room of Scirè, 1982. The bones of crewmen are visible.

Scirè was launched on 6 January 1938 in OTO's shipyard in La Spezia and commissioned on 25 April 1938. At the beginning of the war, she was assigned to 15th Squadron (I Submarine Group) based at La Spezia and was under the command of Adriano Pini. On July 10, 1940, while on patrol in the western Mediterranean, French cargo ship SS Cheik (1058 GRT) was torpedoed and sunk by Scirè 54 nm from the Asmare Light, north of Sardinia.

In the summer of 1940 Scirè underwent a series of modifications allowing her to carry SLC. The size of the tower was reduced, her deck gun was removed, and 3 watertight cylinders were mounted on her deck instead to accommodate maiali. These cylinders, each weighing 2.8 tons, could hold up depths down to 90 meters. On September 24, 1940 Scirè, under command of captain Junio Valerio Borghese, sailed from La Spezia for her first special mission to be performed in Gibraltar. In the evening of September 29, upon reaching the Strait of Gibraltar, Sciré received an order from Supermarina to suspend the mission and return to the base as Force H had left the Mediterranean to operate in the Atlantic.

In 1940 Scire made its first foray into the Bay of Gibraltar with the intent of sabotaging the British ships in Gibraltar Harbour with three manned torpedoes. None of the three were successful with the most daring getting stuck 100 metres from HMS Barham. The crew were forced to withdraw and the explosion of the torpedo's only achievement was to tip off the defenders of Gibraltar Harbour. They organised for boats to drop small charges into the water each night that would have proved fatal to any diver in range of the shock wave.

Scirè entered the Bay of Gibraltar again in September 1941 with better results than the previous time. On September 20, 1941, three tankers were attacked and Fiona Shell (2444 GRT, 1892) was sunk whilst other two ships, RFA Denbydale (8154 GRT / 17 000 t) and MS Durham (10893 GRT) were damaged. The Italians decided to create a permanent base in Spain eventually converting a ship called Olterra that was moored off Algeciras into a permanent base for naval sabotage.

Scirè accomplished many missions inside enemy waters. Among these, the most important was the raid on Alexandria launched on 3 December 1941. Scirè left La Spezia carrying three manned torpedoes. At the island of Leros in the Aegean Sea, it secretly loaded six crew for them: Luigi Durand de la Penne and Emilio Bianchi (maiale 221), Vincenzo Martellotta and Mario Marino (maiale 222), Antonio Marceglia and Spartaco Schergat (maiale 223). On 19 December, Scirè reached Alexandria in Egypt and its manned torpedoes entered the harbour. They sank the British battleships HMS Valiant and Queen Elizabeth in shallow water and damaged the tanker Sagona and the destroyer Jervis. All six torpedo-riders were captured and the battleships returned to service after several months of repairs.

In 1934 the Kirkuk-Haifa oil pipeline was completed and in 1939 a large refinery became operational in the port of Haifa, creating a strategic asset for the British and a magnet for ships during the war.

During a mission to launch manned torpedoes, on 10 August 1942, Scirè was depth charged by the British naval trawler Islay in Haifa bay, about 11 kilometres (5.9 nmi) from the harbour. Scirè surfaced briefly before sinking during which time she was also shelled by 300 Coast Battery, Royal Artillery. Islay was captained by Lieutenant Commander John Clements Ross of North Shields, Tyne and Wear who was later awarded the Distinguished Service Cross for his actions.

The wreck of Scirè, lying at a depth of 32 metres (105 ft), became a popular diving site and Shayetet 13 training location. In 1984 a joint Italian-Israeli Navy ceremony was performed, in which the forward section was removed from the submarine and sent to Italy to become part of a memorial. Italian Navy divers also welded the access hatches shut to prevent divers from entering the wreck.
