= Robert Holles =

British writer (1926–1999)

Robert Holles (1926–1999), was a British author and TV and film screenwriter, often writing on military life but not limited to this alone.

== Biography ==
Holles was the son of a sergeant major, and enlisted in the British Army as a boy soldier at 14 during World War II. He served in Korea as an armourer sergeant (information taken from the book by Robert Holles 'Captain Cat') with the 1st battalion of the Gloucestershire Regiment, and saw action during the Battle of Imjin in 1951, one of "The Glorious Glosters" greatest battle honours.

Holles was prolific in the 1960s and '70s, he wrote with wry humour in such works as Religion and Davey Peach, and experimented with the horror genre in Spawn amongst his non-fiction books he wrote on his experiences with Soldiering (The Guide to Real Subversive Soldiering).

Holles lived for many years in the Essex village of Stebbing and was a keen village cricketer there which was reflected in his book The Guide to Real Village Cricket.

As well as published works he was a successful TV writer with credits for Coronation Street and Hine, as well as one-offs for the prestigious Play for Today slot on the BBC's main TV channel (Michael Regan and The Vanishing Army), two episodes for The Man Outside (Drama series, BBC 1972) and several plays in Thames TV's Armchair Theatre series. Also amongst his credits was the screenplay for the 1964 award-winning film Guns at Batasi (based on his own novel The Siege of Battersea).
