= Licio Visintini =

Italian naval officer (1915–1942)

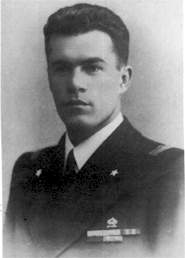
- Born: 12 February 1915; Parenzo, Istria, Austria-Hungary
- Died: 8 December 1942 (aged 27); Gibraltar
- Military career
- Allegiance: Kingdom of Italy
- Branch: Regia Marina
- Service years: 1933–1942
- Conflicts: Spanish Civil War; Italian invasion of Albania; World War II
- Awards: Gold Medal of Military Valor (posthumous); Silver Medal of Military Valor (twice)

Licio Visintini (12 February 1915 – 8 December 1942) was an Italian naval officer during World War II. Visintini was decorated for his operations against Allied shipping in Gibraltar during the Battle of the Mediterranean. His brother Mario Visintini was a famous flying ace; both were killed during the war.

== Biography ==
Visintini joined the Italian Naval Academy in Livorno in 1933, and received his appointment as Ensign in 1937. Initially assigned to surface ships, he participated in missions during the Spanish Civil War; he then served on the submarines Narvalo and then on Atropo. While on the latter, in April 1939, he participated in the operations for the Italian invasion of Albania.

On 10 June 1940, when Italy entered World War II, Visintini was serving on the submarine Torelli, and participated in its first mission in the Atlantic Ocean. On his return, he asked to be assigned to the Tenth MAS Flotilla in La Spezia, where he became an assault craft operator. In 1941, he was promoted to Lieutenant and was given command of the "Ursa Major squadron", deployed against the British naval base at Gibraltar.

In the night between 25 and 26 May 1941, Visintini led the first attack on Gibraltar with three SLC manned torpedoes released from the submarine Scirè (operation "B.G.3"); the raiders managed to enter the harbor, but the operation failed due to a combination of mechanical breakdowns suffered by the SLCs and sudden illnesses that seized two of the operators (moreover, Force H, the objective of the attack, had sailed just a few hours before). Visintini and his companions had to swim to the shore, and then they returned to Italy with the help of agents from the Italian Navy intelligence service.

In the night between 19 and 20 September 1941, Visintini led another attack against Gibraltar (operation "B.G.4"), again with the use of three SLC released by the Scirè. This time, the operation resulted in a success: Visintini and his partner Giovanni Magro mined and damaged the naval tanker RFA Denbydale (of 17,200 tons of displacement), which remained afloat but was considered a constructive total loss because of the severity of the damage (it was reduced to a floating fuel depot until its demolition), while the other two SLCs sank the tanker Fiona Shell and severely damaged the armed merchant Durham. The operators then destroyed the SLCs and swam to the coast, where they were again assisted by Italian agents who helped them to return to Italy.

In the summer of 1942, when it was decided to stop using submarines for the approach of SLCs to the port of Gibraltar, instead resorting to turning the steamer Olterra, interned in Algeciras, into a secret floating base for SLCs, Visintini was tasked with directing the transformation, as well as being given command of the SLC group that would operate from the ship.

At 23:15 on 7 December 1942, Visintini left Olterra for operation "B.G.5", and steered his manned torpedo towards the port of Gibraltar, with the aim of mining the battleship HMS Nelson. He and his partner, Leading Seaman Giovanni Magro, managed to overcome the external obstructions and entered the harbour, but were both killed by the depth charges thrown by British surveillance to ward off Italian raiders. Visintini and Magro were both awarded a posthumous Gold Medal of Military Valor. Their bodies were recovered by the British and buried with full military honours.

The Marina Militare named a De Cristofaro-class corvette, F 546, after him.
