= Istrian Italians =

Ethnic group in Europe

Istriani italiani (Italian) Talijanski Istrani (Croatian) Italijanski Istrani (Slovene)
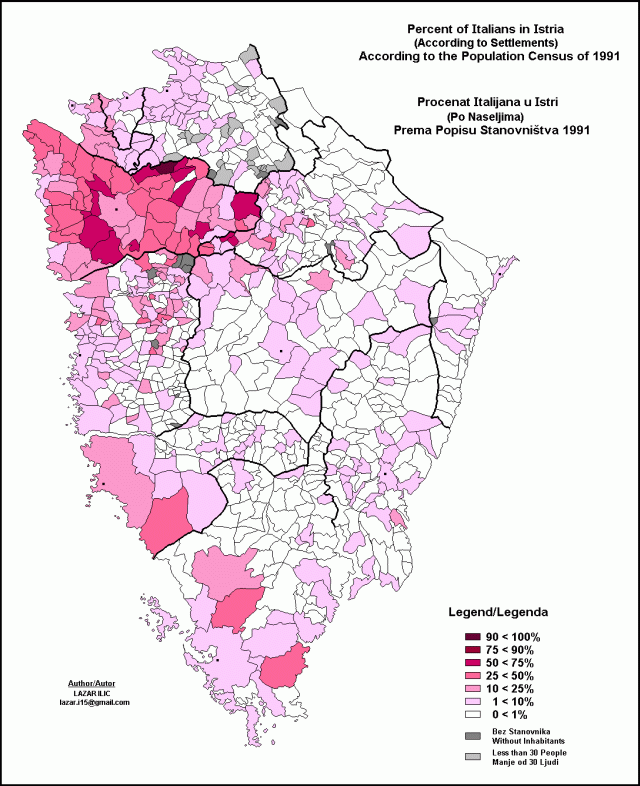
- Percentage of Italians in Croatia's and Slovenia's Istria, 1991

Regions with significant populations
- Istria, Italy

Languages
- Italian, Slovene, Croatian, Istriot and Venetian

Religion
- Roman Catholic

Related ethnic groups
- Slovenes, Croats, other Italians; Especially Dalmatian Italians and Venetians

Istrian Italians (Italian: istriani italiani; Slovene: Italijanski Istrani; Croatian: Talijanski Istrani) are an ethnic group from the Adriatic region of Istria in modern northwestern Croatia and southwestern Slovenia. Istrian Italians descend from the original Latinized population of Roman Histria, from the Venetian-speaking settlers who colonized the region during the time of the Republic of Venice, from the local Croatian people who culturally assimilated, and from colonization between the two world wars.

While nationalization processes were still underway, in 19th century Istria the west side of the peninsula had a majority of Italian language and Romance verniculars speakers, while the Croatian language was spoken by the majority in the central and eastern regions and on the islands, and Slovene in the north. Italian language was the official language in the territories of the former Venetian Republic, which encouraged many Istrians to identify as Italians, in spite of their mother tongue and ethnic origins. Italian speaking population made up about a third of the population in 1900, and 36% in 1910. The Italian population growth was followed by a stark decline during the Istrian–Dalmatian exodus (1943–1960), with estimates of those who left ranging from 163,000, to 230,000 and 350,000. A significant Italian minority still lives in the Croatian County of Istria (5.01%) and in Slovenian Istria (3.3%), where they are granted minority rights. According to the official Slovenian and Croatian censuses conducted in 2001 and 2002 respectively, they number around 22,000.

Throughout history, Istrian Italians exerted a vast and significant influence on Istria, especially cultural and architectural. The number of people resident in the Croatian part of Istria declaring themselves to be Italian nearly doubled between 1981 and 1991, i.e. before and after the dissolution of Yugoslavia.

== History ==
=== Early period ===
Regio X Venetia et Histria of Roman Italy

Historian Theodor Mommsen wrote that Istria (included in the Regio X Venetia et Histria of Roman Italy since Augustus) was fully romanized in the 5th century AD.

Between 500 and 700 AD, Slavs settled in Southeastern Europe (Eastern Adriatic), and their number ever increased, and with the Ottoman invasion Slavs were pushed from the south and east. This led to Italic people becoming ever more confined to urban areas, while some areas of the countryside were populated by Slavs, with exceptions in western and southern Istria which remained fully Romance-speaking.

By the 11th century, most of the interior mountainous areas of northern and eastern Istria (Liburnia) were inhabited by South Slavs, while the Romance population continued to prevail in the south and west of the peninsula. Linguistically, the Romance inhabitants of Istria were most probably divided into two main linguistic groups: in the north-west, the speakers of a Rhaeto-Romance language similar to Ladin and Friulian prevailed, while in the south, the natives most probably spoke a variant of the Dalmatian language.

One modern claim suggests the original language of the romanized Istrians survived the invasions, this being the Istriot language which was spoken by some near Pula. Republic of Venice influenced the neolatins of Istria for many centuries from the Middle Ages until 1797, until conquered by Napoleon: Capodistria and Pola were important centres of art and culture during the Italian Renaissance. Other historians have attributed the ancient language of romanized Istrians as being the Istro-Romanian.

=== Venetian era ===
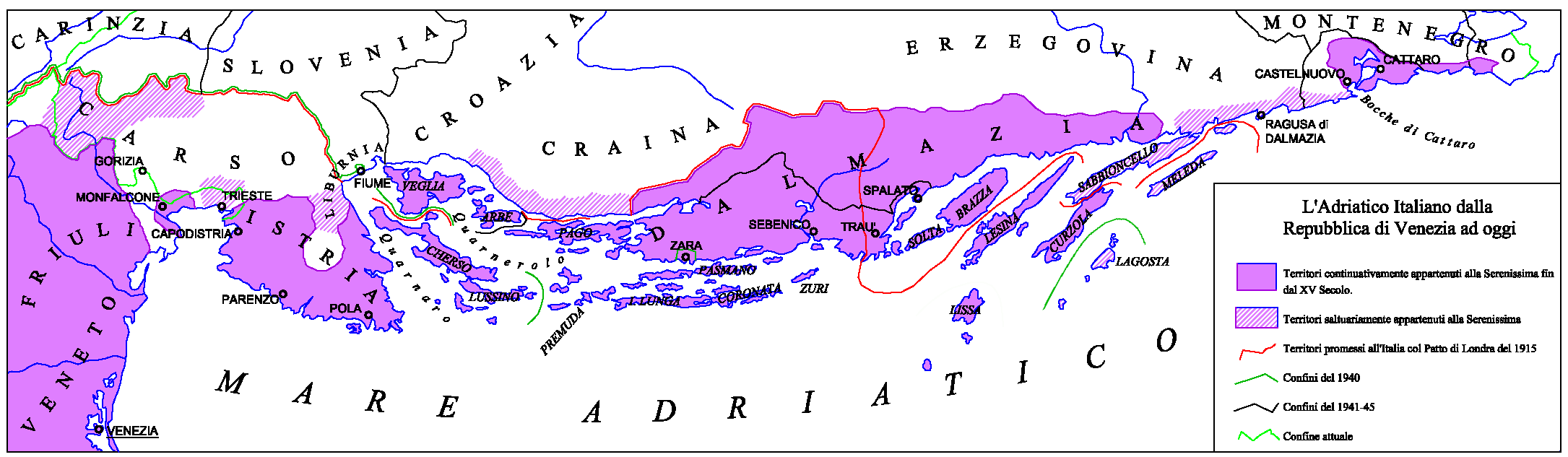
Map of Istria and Dalmatia with the ancient domains of the Republic of Venice (indicated in fuchsia, the territories that belonged occasionally are dashed diagonally.)

In the 14th century, epidemics such as the Black Death decimated in those years the Istrian population, which was still mostly of Romance ethnicity. As a consequence of depopulation, Venice started settling Slavic communities to repopulate the interior areas of the peninsula. These were mostly Čakavian and partially Štokavian speaking South Slavs from Dalmatia and present-day Montenegro (differently from Kajkavian and proto-Slovene speakers that lived in the northern areas of the peninsula).

At the same time, settlers from the Veneto region were used to resettle the towns. This caused a language shift of the local Romance population who replaced the old Romance (either Rhaeto-Romance or Italo-Dalmatian) languages with the Venetian language. Only in the extreme south of the peninsula did the original Istrian Romance language survive: under strong Venetian influences it transformed itself into the modern Istriot language. Until the early 19th century, Dalmatian continued to be spoken on the island of Veglia / Krk, and a dialect of Friulian in the town of Muggia: both became extinct in the mid 19th century, replaced by Venetian.

In 1374 Because of the implementation of a treaty of inheritance, central and eastern Istria fell to the House of Habsburg, while Venice continued to control the northern, western and south-eastern portion of the peninsula, including the major coastal towns of Capodistria / Koper, Parenzo / Poreč, Rovigno / Rovinj, Pola / Pula, Fianona / Plomin, and the interior towns of Albona / Labin and Pinguente / Buzet. This created a dichotomy that characterized Istria until the late 18th century. The Venetian culture and language left a profound impact on Venetian Istria. By the Baroque and Enlightenment periods, Istrian Italians were completely integrated into the wider Italian culture via their belonging to the Republic of Venice. The towns of Venetian Istria became almost exclusively Venetian-speaking, and Venetian Italian was the language of commerce, culture and administration. Nevertheless, significant numbers of South Slavic speakers (mostly Slovene and Čakavian Croatian) continued to dwell in the rural areas of Venetian Istria, especially in the north of the province and on the border with Austrian Istria.

On the other hand, interior and eastern Istria were included in the Central European cultural sphere and were dominated by a feudal culture. By the late 18th century, the vast majority of Austrian Istria were Slavic (Slovene and Croat) speakers.

=== Napoleonic era ===
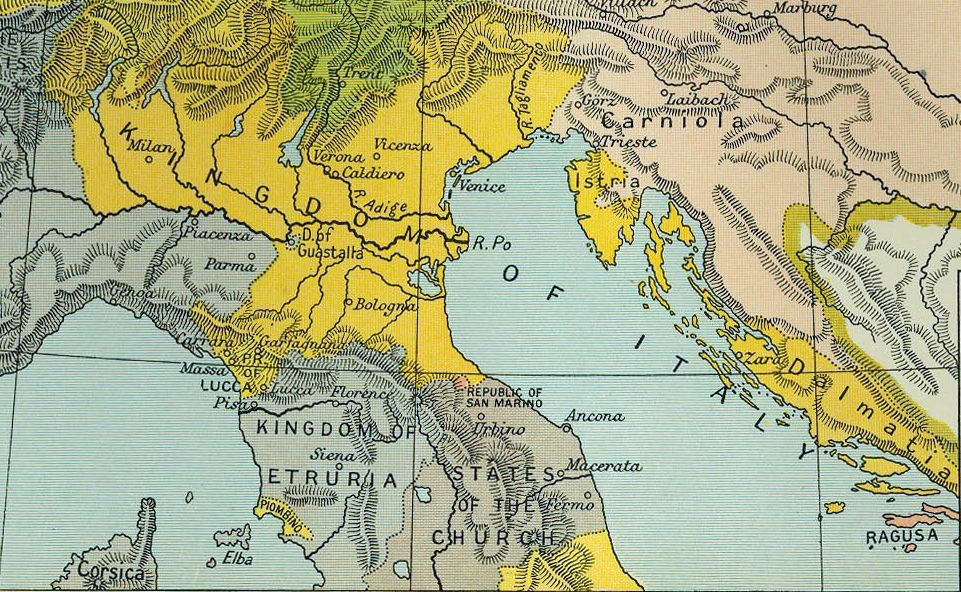
1807: Istria inside the Napoleonic Kingdom of Italy

In 1797, during the Napoleonic Wars, the Republic of Venice was dissolved. After the Treaty of Campo Formio (1797) Austria occupied the Venetian part of the peninsula. Istria was included in the Napoleonic Kingdom of Italy from 1805 to 1809, and successively in the Illyrian Provinces from 1809.

After a short French interim, Austria reconquered the whole peninsula in 1813, and unified it into a single province. As a result, Istrian Italians became a minority in the new administrative unit, although they maintained their social and part of their political power.

From the Middle Ages to the 19th century, Italian and Slavic communities in Istria had lived peacefully side by side because they did not know the national identification, given that they generically defined themselves as "Istrians", of "Romance" or "Slavic" culture.

=== Austrian period ===
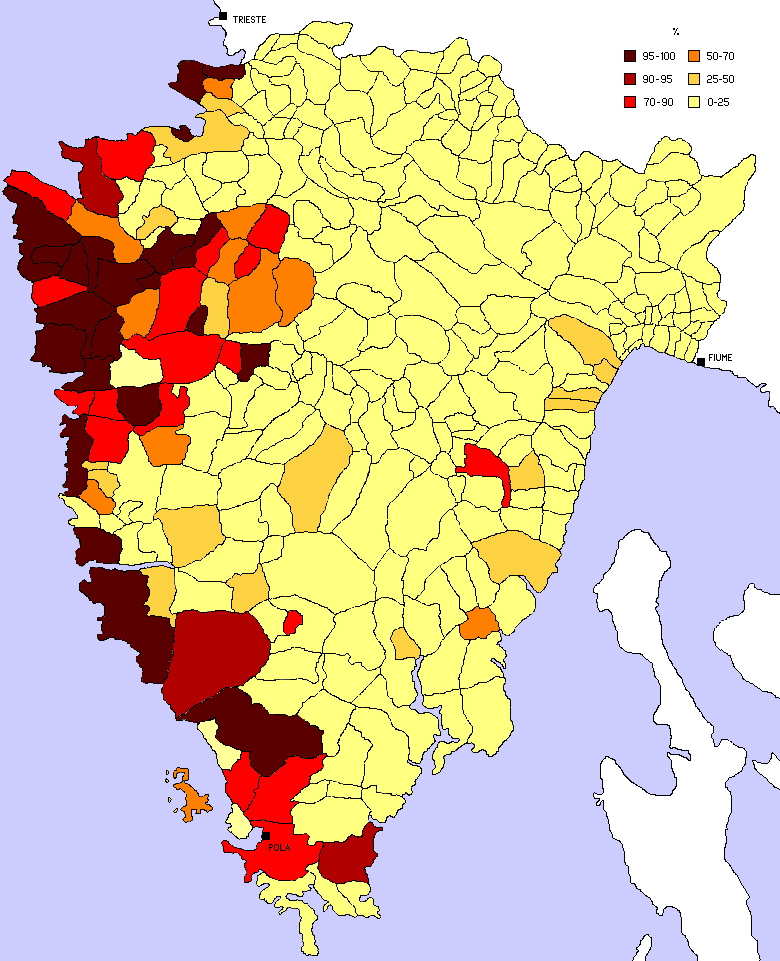
1910 census, percentages of the population who used Italian as the main language.

Although the incorporation into the Austrian Empire caused deep changes in the political assets of the region, it did not alter the social balance. Venetian-speaking Istrian Italians continued to dominate the region both culturally and economically. In the first half of the 19th century, the use of the Venetian language even extended to some areas of former Austrian Istria, like the town of Pazin / Pisino. The Austrian censuses detected a gradual but constant rise of Italian speakers both in numerical and proportional terms: in 1848, around a third of Istrians were Italian (Venetian or Istriot) speakers.

From the early 19th century onward, the local Croats and Slovenes engaged in a national revival, demanding linguistic and national rights that challenged the supremacy of the Italian language and culture in Istria. The Croatian-Slovene national movement gained force only in the second part of the 19th century, causing a clash with a parallel nationalist movement of the Istrian Italians.

Many Istrian Italians looked with sympathy towards the Risorgimento movement that fought for the unification of Italy. However, after 1866, when the Veneto and Friuli regions were ceded by the Austrians to the newly formed Kingdom of Italy, Istria remained part of the Austro-Hungarian Empire, together with other Italian-speaking areas on the eastern Adriatic (Trieste, Gorizia and Gradisca, Fiume). This triggered the gradual rise of Italian irredentism among many Italians in Istria, who demanded the unification of the Austrian Littoral, Fiume and Dalmatia with Italy.

Under Austrian rule in the 19th century, it included a large population of Italians, Croats, Slovenes, some Vlachs/Istro-Romanians and even a few Montenegrins. The Italians in Istria supported the Italian Risorgimento: as a consequence, the Austrians saw the Italians as enemies and favoured the Slav communities of Istria During the meeting of the Council of Ministers of 12 November 1866, Emperor Franz Joseph I of Austria outlined a wide-ranging project aimed at the Germanization or Slavization of the areas of the empire with an Italian presence:

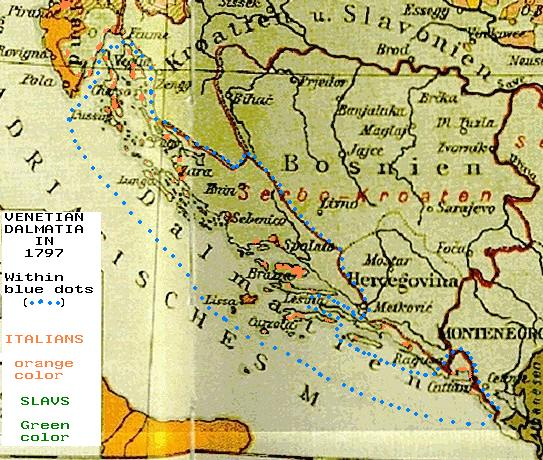
Austrian linguistic map from 1896. In green the areas where Slavs were the majority of the population, in orange the areas where Istrian Italians and Dalmatian Italians were the majority of the population. The boundaries of Venetian Dalmatia in 1797 are delimited with blue dots.

His Majesty expressed the precise order that action be taken decisively against the influence of the Italian elements still present in some regions of the Crown and, appropriately occupying the posts of public, judicial, masters employees as well as with the influence of the press, work in South Tyrol, Dalmatia and Littoral for the Germanization and Slavization of these territories according to the circumstances, with energy and without any regard. His Majesty calls the central offices to the strong duty to proceed in this way to what has been established.

— Franz Joseph I of Austria, Council of the Crown of 12 November 1866

This tension created - by some claims - a "huge" emigration of Italians from Istria before World War I, reducing their percentage inside the peninsula inhabitants (there are some claims Italians made more than 50% of the total population for centuries, but at the end of the 19th century they were reduced to only two fifths according to some estimates).

A limited tension with the Austrian state did not in fact stop the rise of the use of the Italian language, in the second part of the 19th century, when the population of predominantly Italian-speaking towns in Istria rose dramatically: in the part of Istria that eventually became part of Croatia, the first Austrian census from 1846 found 34 thousand Italian speakers, alongside 120 thousand Croatian speakers. Until 1910, the proportion changed: there were 108 thousand Italian speakers and 134 thousand Croatian speakers. Vanni D'Alessio notes (2008), the Austrian surveys of the language of use (in the Austrian censuses, the ethnic composition of the population wasn't surveyed, only the "Umgangsprache") "overestimated the diffusion of the socially dominant languages of the empire... The capacity of assimilation of the Italian language suggests that amongst those who declared themselves Italian speakers in Istria, there were people whose mother tongue was different." D'Alessio notes even the people who immigrated from non-Croatian and non-Italian parts of the Habsburg Empire tended to use Italian, after living in Istrian towns long enough. Contrasting the claims of a "huge emigration" of Italians from Istria, D'Allesio writes about an important influx of immigrants from the Kingdom of Italy to Istria, during the last decades of the Austrian rule.

In the same period, the Istrian Slovenes and Croats, who represented around three-fifths of the Istrian population, increased their demands for national and linguistic emancipation. The result was the intensification of the ethnic strife between the two groups, although it was limited to institutional battles and it rarely manifested in violent forms.

Indeed, in 1910, the ethnic and linguistic composition was completely mixed and the Italians were reduced to a minority, although still significant. According to the Austrian census results, out of 404,309 inhabitants in the "Margravate of Istria", 168,116 (41.6%) spoke Croatian, 147,416 (36.5%) spoke Italian, 55,365 (13.7%) spoke Slovene, 13,279 (3.3%) spoke German, 882 (0.2%) spoke Romanian, 2,116 (0.5%) spoke other languages and 17,135 (4.2%) were non-citizens, which had not been asked for their language of communication.

Excluding the almost exclusively Croatian-speaking areas that were annexed to Yugoslavia after WWI (Kastav and the island of Krk), Istria had 39% of Italian speakers, 37% of Croatian, and 14.7% Slovene speakers.

Until the end of the Austro-Hungarian Monarchy, the bourgeois Italian national liberal elites retained much of the political control in Istria.

=== Annexation to Italy ===
The Julian March within the Kingdom of Italy (1923–1947), with its four provinces: the Province of Gorizia (blue), the Province of Trieste (green), the Province of Fiume (red), the Province of Pola (yellow)

During World War One, many Istrians fought as volunteers on the Italian side against the Austro-Hungarian Empire. Among them, the most famous was the Nazario Sauro from Koper (Capodistria).

After the end of the war, the whole peninsula was occupied by the Kingdom of Italy, and officially annexed to Italy with the Treaty of Rapallo of 1920. Istria was included in the administrative region known as the Julian March/Venezia Giulia. After the Fascist takeover of Italy in 1922, Italian became the sole language of administration and education. A fierce policy of Italianization was followed which prohibited all use of any language but Italian. Many Slovenes and Croats left the region, which strengthened the Italian positions. However, ethnic tensions grew, and a Slovenian and Croatian anti-Fascist insurgency started to appear in the late 1920s, although it was much less strong than in other parts of the Julian March.

Indeed, before the Treaty of Rapallo, the Italians in Istria accounted for nearly half of the local inhabitants and were mostly an indigenous population, but after the treaty they were bolstered by some new arrivals of the so-called regnicoli (from the Kingdom of Italy), which were never well liked by the indigenous Istrians Italians.

The Austrian 1910 census indicated approximately 182,500 people who listed Italian as their language of communication in what is now the territory of Slovenia and Croatia: 137,131 in Istria and 28,911 in Fiume/Rijeka (1918). Meanwhile, the Italian 1936 census indicated approximately 230,000 people who listed Italian as their language of communication (in what is now the territory of Slovenia and Croatia, then part of the Italian state): nearly 194,000 in today's Croatia and 36,000 in today's Slovenia.

=== World War Two and its consequences ===
After the Italian armistice of 1943, Istria became a battlefield between the Nazi German army and the partisan (mostly Yugoslav) insurgency. Already in September 1943, several hundreds Istrian Italians were killed by the Yugoslav partisans because of their allegiance to the Italian State. This was the first wave of the Foibe massacres, which continued after the Yugoslav takeover of the region in May 1945.

From 1943 until 1953, according to various data, between 200,000 and 330,000 Italians emigrated from these regions. This emigration of Italians (called Istrian–Dalmatian exodus) reduced the total population of the region and altered its ethnic structure.

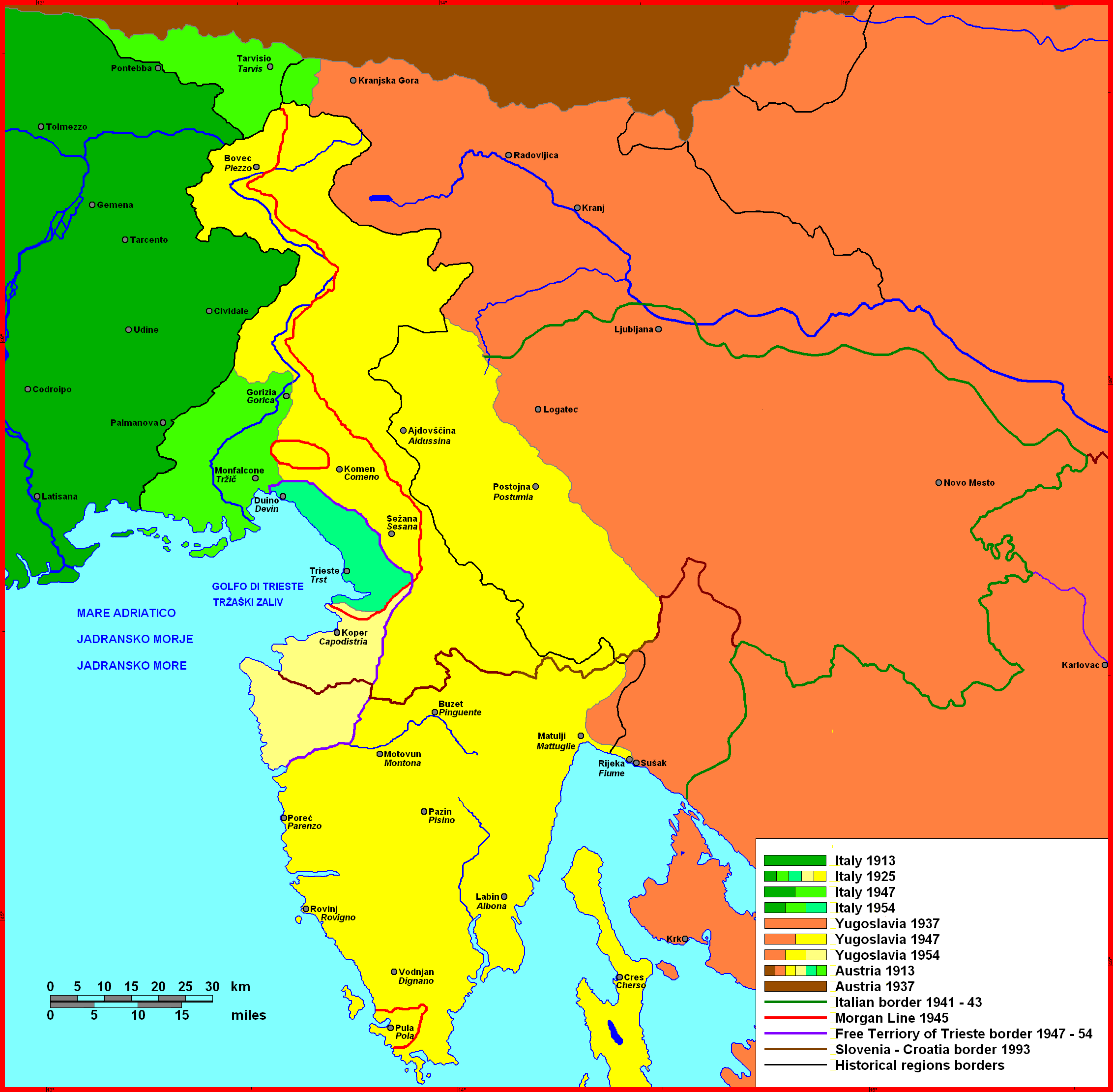
Changes to the Italian eastern border from 1920 to 1975. The Austrian Littoral, later renamed Julian March, which was assigned to Italy in 1920 with the Treaty of Rapallo (with adjustments of its border in 1924 after the Treaty of Rome) and which was then ceded to Yugoslavia in 1947 with the Treaty of Paris Areas annexed to Italy in 1920 and remained Italian even after 1947 Areas annexed to Italy in 1920, passed to the Free Territory of Trieste in 1947 with the Paris treaties and definitively assigned to Italy in 1975 with the Treaty of Osimo Areas annexed to Italy in 1920, passed to the Free Territory of Trieste in 1947 with the Paris treaties and definitively assigned to Yugoslavia in 1975 with the Osimo treaty

After the Yugoslav Communist troops occupied Istria in May 1945, many Italians started leaving Istria under the pressure of the new authorities who demanded the annexation of Istria to Yugoslavia. With an agreement between the Allied forces and Tito's Yugoslav government, a line of demarcation known as the Morgan Line was set in June 1945: most of Istria remained under Yugoslav occupation, while the towns of Pula and Muggia were transferred to Allied administration.

With the peace treaty of 1947, most of Istria (including Pula) was assigned to Yugoslavia. This triggered the Istrian–Dalmatian exodus, the departure of the large majority of Istrian Italians. Only the north-western portion was assigned to zone B of the short-lived Free Territory of Trieste, but de facto remained under Yugoslav administration.

=== Part of Yugoslavia ===
In 1953 according to the official census only 36,000 Italians lived in Yugoslavia, 16% of the Italian population before World War II, and another 35,000 lived in the zone B of the Free Territory of Trieste (FTT). After the dissolution of the FTT in 1954, and the definitive handover of zone B to Yugoslavia, almost the totality of Istria became officially part of Yugoslavia. This triggered the last wave of the Istrian–Dalmatian exodus, with most of the Istrian Italians leaving the zone B for elsewhere (mainly to Italy) because intimidated or preferring not to live in communist Yugoslavia. Yugoslav Istria was divided between Croatia and Slovenia, so that the Istrian Italians became subject to two different administrations.

In 1961 25,651 Italians remained in Yugoslavia (this number included some small minorities in Dalmatia), around 10-12% of the Italian population before World War II. Italians continued to emigrate in later decades (most of them to Australia, Canada, South America or the USA). Therefore, their population declined in each subsequent census to 15,132 inhabitants in 1981.

It has to be emphasized that the data of the Yugoslav censuses are unreliable in relation to the real number of Italians, since many members of the Italian minority, for various reasons, chose to be nationally undeclared or preferred to use their regional identity and declared themselves as Istrians. Not surprisingly in 2001 (i.e. after the dissolution of Yugoslavia), the Croatian and Slovenian censuses reported a total Italian population of 21,894 (with the figure in Croatia nearly doubling).

In its 1996 report on 'Local self-government, territorial integrity and protection of minorities' the Council of Europe's European Commission for Democracy through Law (the Venice Commission) put it that "a great majority of the local Italians, some thousands of Slovenes and of nationally undefined bilingual 'Istrians', used their legal right from the peace treaty to 'opt out' of the Yugoslav controlled part of Istria". In several waves, they moved to Italy and elsewhere (also overseas, mainly in the Americas) and claimed Italian or other citizenship.

== Current situation ==
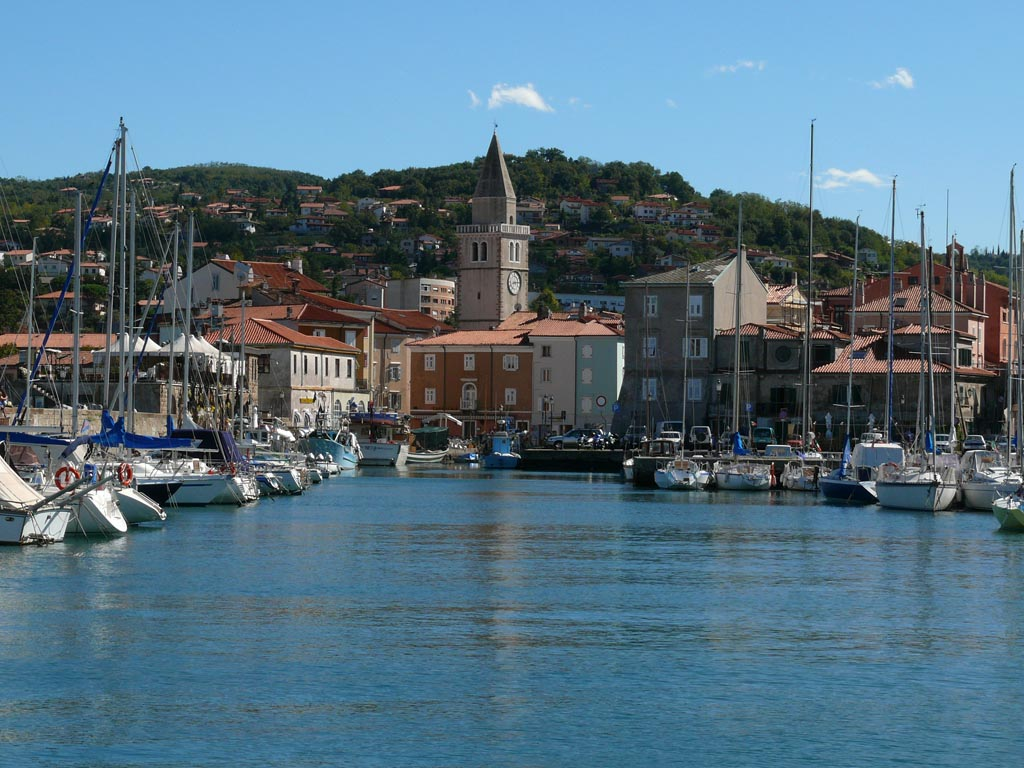
Muggia, one of the two Italian towns of contemporary Istria

Today Istrian Italians are mostly a national minority in Croatia. Croatian municipalities with a significant Italian population include Grisignana / Grožnjan (36%), Verteneglio / Brtonigla (32%), and Buie / Buje (24%).

The last census (2001) showed that there are nearly 50,000 Istrian Italians in Istria as a whole (between Croatia, Slovenia and Italy), more than half of them living in Italy:

Municipality	Italian name	Country	Inhabitants	Mother tongue Italian	Mother tongue Croatian and Slovenian
Labin, city	Albona	Croatia	10,424	1.69%	90.19%
Buje, city	Buie	Croatia	4,441	28.57%	65.96%
Novigrad, city	Cittanova	Croatia	3,889	9.95%	83.52%
Vodnjan, city	Dignano	Croatia	5,838	13.53%	74.51%
Poreč, city	Parenzo	Croatia	16,607	2.40%	89.71%
Buzet, city	Pinguente	Croatia	5,999	0.60%	93.35%
Pazin, city	Pisino	Croatia	8,279	0.75%	96.67%
Pula, city	Pola	Croatia	52,220	3.26%	87.75%
Rovinj, city	Rovigno	Croatia	12,968	8.14%	83.11%
Umag, city	Umago	Croatia	12,699	13.61%	79.38%
Bale	Valle	Croatia	1,170	14.27%	81.37%
Barban	Barbana d'Istria	Croatia	2,491	0.60%	97.07%
Brtonigla	Verteneglio	Croatia	1,523	35.72%	60.15%
Cerovlje	Cerreto	Croatia	1,453	0.48%	98.69%
Fažana	Fasana	Croatia	3,463	2.77%	92.72%
Gračišće	Gallignana	Croatia	1,312	0.08%	98.86%
Grožnjan	Grisignana	Croatia	656	44.51%	51.83%
Kanfanar	Canfanaro	Croatia	1,498	1.00%	95.06%
Karojba	Caroiba del Subiente	Croatia	1,404	0.36%	98.65%
Kaštelir-Labinci	Castellier-Santa Domenica	Croatia	1,439	1.94%	75.89%
Kršan	Chersano	Croatia	2,829	0.35%	94.84%
Lanišće	Lanischie	Croatia	268	-	98.50%
Ližnjan	Lisignano	Croatia	4,087	4.04%	90.05%
Lupoglav	Lupogliano	Croatia	836	0.36%	97.97%
Marčana	Marzana	Croatia	4,250	0.75%	95.81%
Medulin	Medolino	Croatia	6,552	2.64%	86.88%
Motovun	Montona	Croatia	912	7.13%	89.80%
Oprtalj	Portole	Croatia	748	11.76%	80.75%
Pićan	Pedena	Croatia	1,722	0.17%	98.90%
Raša	Arsia	Croatia	2,809	0.78%	90.21%
Sveta Nedelja	Santa Domenica d'Albona	Croatia	2,898	0.62%	92.20%
Sveti Lovreč	San Lorenzo del Pasenatico	Croatia	960	1.15%	90.84%
Sveti Petar u Šumi	San Pietro in Selve	Croatia	1,051	0.38%	98.39%
Svetvinčenat	Sanvincenti	Croatia	2,179	1.33%	95.82%
Tar-Vabriga	Torre-Abrega	Croatia	2,148	10.01%	84.27%
Tinjan	Antignana	Croatia	1,729	0.81%	96.93%
Višnjan	Visignano	Croatia	2,096	3.53%	92.89%
Vižinada	Visinada	Croatia	1,142	5.17%	92.91%
Vrsar	Orsera	Croatia	1,923	2.03%	91.89%
Žminj	Gimino	Croatia	3,360	0.77%	97.95%
Milje	Muggia	Italy	13,208	94.80%	04.80%
Dolina	San Dorligo della Valle	Italy	6,025	29.20%	70.50%
Koper, city	Capodistria	Slovenia	49,206	2.22%	74.14%
Izola	Isola	Slovenia	14,549	4.26%	69.13%
Piran	Pirano	Slovenia	16,758	7.00%	66.69%
Lovran	Laurana	Croatia	3,527	1.16%	94.10%
Opatija, city	Abbazia	Croatia	12,719	1.37%	93.95%
Mošćenička Draga	Draga di Moschiena	Croatia	1,288	0.62%	96.59%

Source: Croatian Census - 2021. Slovenian Census - 2002. Italian Census - 1970/2001

== Bilingual municipalities in Istria ==
- Buje/Buie
- Novigrad/Cittanova d'Istria
- Vodnjan/Dignano d'Istria
- Poreč/Parenzo
- Pula/Pola
- Rovinj/Rovigno d'Istria
- Umag/Umago
- Kaštelir-Labinci/Castellier-Santa Domenica
- Fažana/Fasana
- Funtana/Fontane
- Grožnjan/Grisignana
- Ližnjan/Lisignano
- Motovun/Montona
- Oprtalj/Portole
- Vrsar/Orsera
- Tar-Vabriga/Torre-Abrega
- Bale/Valle d'Istria
- Brtonigla/Verteneglio
- Višnjan/Visignano
- Vižinada/Visinada
- Koper/Capodistria
- Piran/Pirano
- Izola/Isola

== Education and Italian language ==
=== Croatia ===
Besides Croat language schools, in the Croatian County of Istria there are also kindergartens in Buje/Buie, Brtonigla/Verteneglio, Novigrad/Cittanova, Umag/Umago, Poreč/Parenzo, Vrsar/Orsera, Rovinj/Rovigno, Bale/Valle, Vodnjan/Dignano, Pula/Pola and Labin/Albona, as well as primary schools in Buje/Buie, Brtonigla/Verteneglio, Novigrad/Cittanova, Umag/Umago, Poreč/Parenzo, Vodnjan/Dignano, Rovinj/Rovigno, Bale/Valle and Pula/Pola, as well as lower secondary schools and upper secondary schools in Buje/Buie, Rovinj/Rovigno and Pula/Pola, all with Italian as the language of instruction.

=== Slovenia ===
Besides Slovene language schools, in Slovenian Istria there are also kindergartens, primary schools, lower secondary schools and upper secondary schools with Italian as the language of instruction in Koper/Capodistria, Izola/Isola and Piran/Pirano. At the state-owned University of Primorska, however, which is also established in the bilingual area, Slovene is the only language of instruction (although the official name of the university includes the Italian version, too).

== Citizenship ==
As per the Paris Peace Treaties, 1947, those people who lived in the territories of the Kingdom of Italy ceded to Yugoslavia between 1940 and 1947 would lose their Italian citizenship, but could keep it should they decide to move to Italy in a ten-year-period following the treaty.

As such, the local Italian residents who opted to remain in Istria, Rijeka, Lastovo and other territories lost their Italian citizenship.

On 8 March 2006, the Italian government approved law n. 124, which would provide a possibility to regain Italian citizenship to "those Italians and their descendants residing in Istria, Fiume, and Dalmatia between 1940 and 1947, when they relinquished it upon these territories being ceded to Yugoslavia. To access this initiative, the following documents are required:

- Birth certificate, preferably with an international format;
- Certificate proving the possession of a relevant foreign citizenship (Croatian or Slovene)
- Certificate of residency in these territories.
- Proof of residence in these territories between 1940 and 1947.
- Certificate released by local Italian entities of the Unione Italiana, including but not limited to the subscription to such entity and proven knowledge of the Italian language.
- Other documents proving the language of the applicant (such as diplomas released from schools where Italian is the language of instruction, grade reports...)

== Culture ==
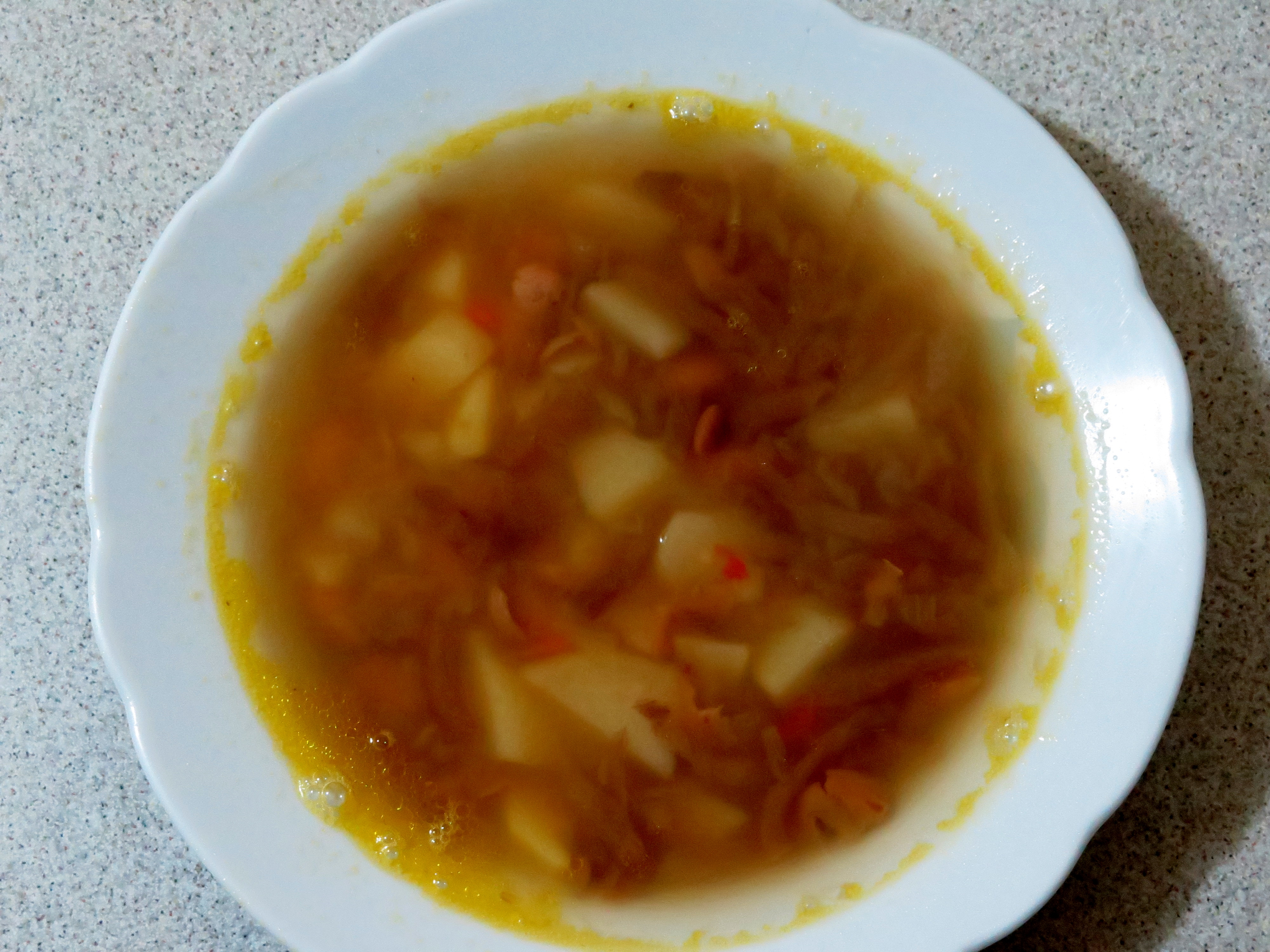
Istrian stew

Istrian culture has been deeply influenced by Venetian culture, especially from an architectural point of view. Istrian cities are characterized by architectural forms with a Venetian imprint, an influence that extends to urban planning, particularly in the grid formed by streets and squares. This influence is still visible today, both in cities and in smaller population centres. Noteworthy is the Venetian architecture of Poreč.

Italian cultural influence has resulted in the resemblance of many Istrian dances to those of Northern Italy. This applies to dances done by the modern-day Croatian population and by the Italian national minority found today in the larger towns and some villages in the western part of Istria. Dances done by both the Croatian and the Italian communities include Molferina or Mafrina and Kvadrilja. Dances specific to the Istrian Italians include La Veneziana, Bersagliera, Denci, Sette Passi and the very similar dances Vilota and Furlana.

The Croatian cuisine of Istria was influenced by Italian cuisine, given the historical presence of Istrian Italians, influence that has eased after the Istrian-Dalmatian exodus. For example, the influence of Italian cuisine on Croatian dishes is seen in the pršut (similar to Italian prosciutto) and in the preparation of homemade pasta. Italian cuisine has particularly influenced the cuisine of Slovenian Istria, given the historical presence of Istrian Italians, influence that has eased after the Istrian-Dalmatian exodus. Slovenian dishes of Italian origin are njoki (similar to Italian gnocchi), rizota (the Slovenian version of risotto) and zilkrofi (similar to Italian ravioli).

Istrian stew or Jota (Croatian: Istarska jota; Slovene: Jota, Italian: Jota) is a soup made of beans, sauerkraut or sour turnip, potatoes, bacon, spare ribs, known in the northern Adriatic region. It is especially popular in Friuli-Venezia Giulia, Istria and some other parts of northwestern Croatia. Under the name jota, it is also typical of the whole Slovenian Littoral and territories in northeastern Italy, especially in the provinces of Trieste (where it is considered to be the prime example of Triestine food) and Gorizia, and in some peripheral areas of northeastern Friuli (the Torre river valley, and the mountain borderlands of Carnia and Slavia Veneta). The stew originated in Friuli before spreading east and south. According to the most accredited thesis, "Jota" derives from the Latin jutta (meaning broth) and has parallels in the ancient friulan language and in modern emilian-romagnol.

== Notable Istrian Italians ==
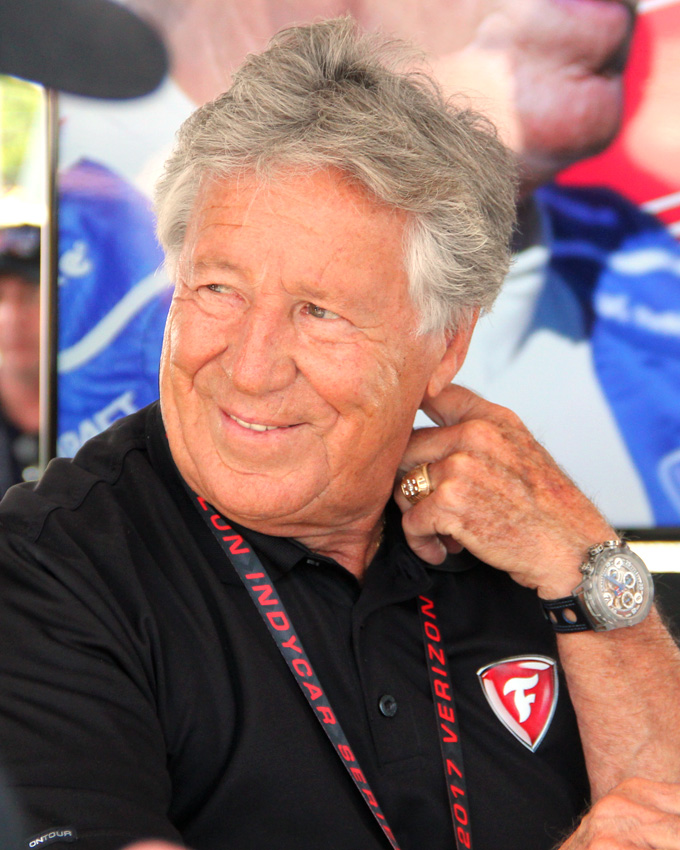
Mario Andretti

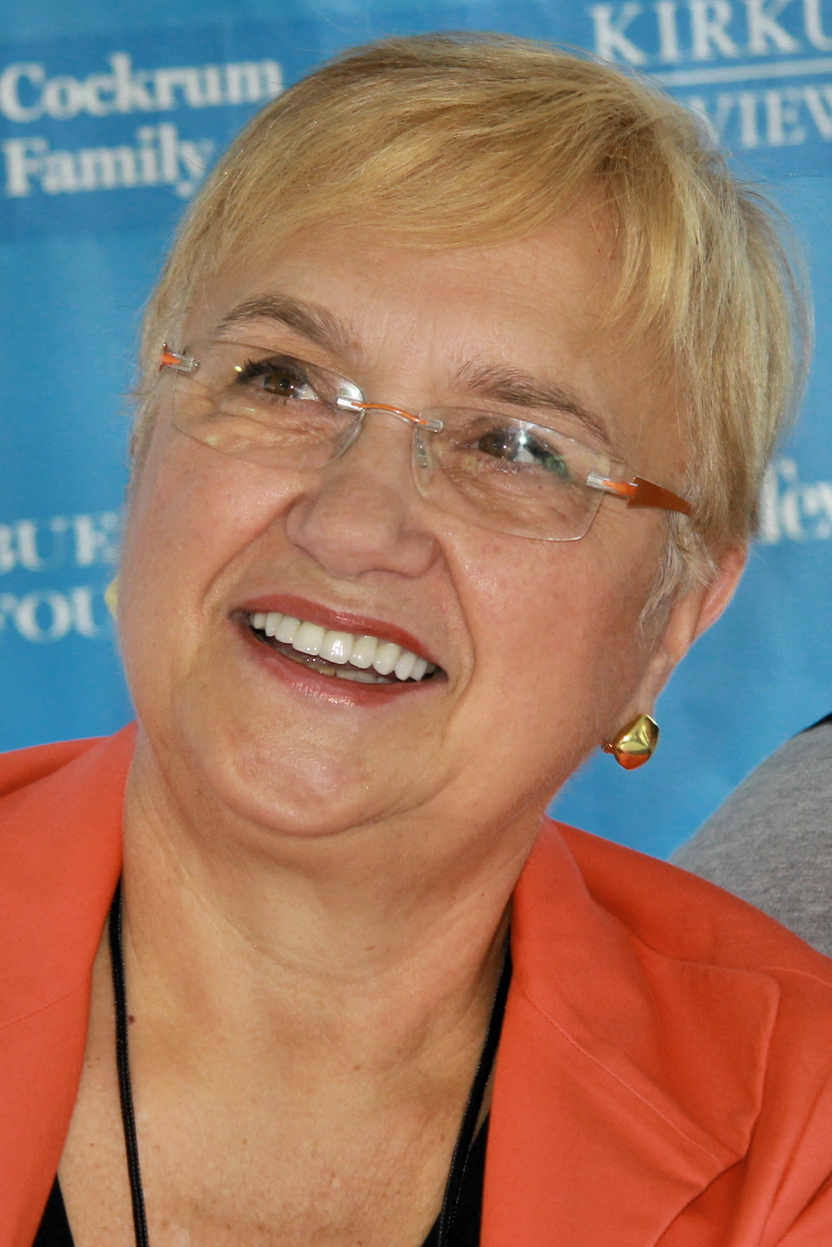
Lidia Bastianich

Antonio Grossich

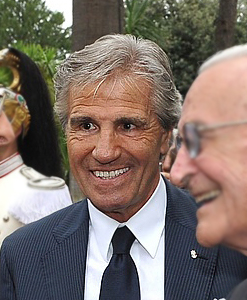
Nino Benvenuti

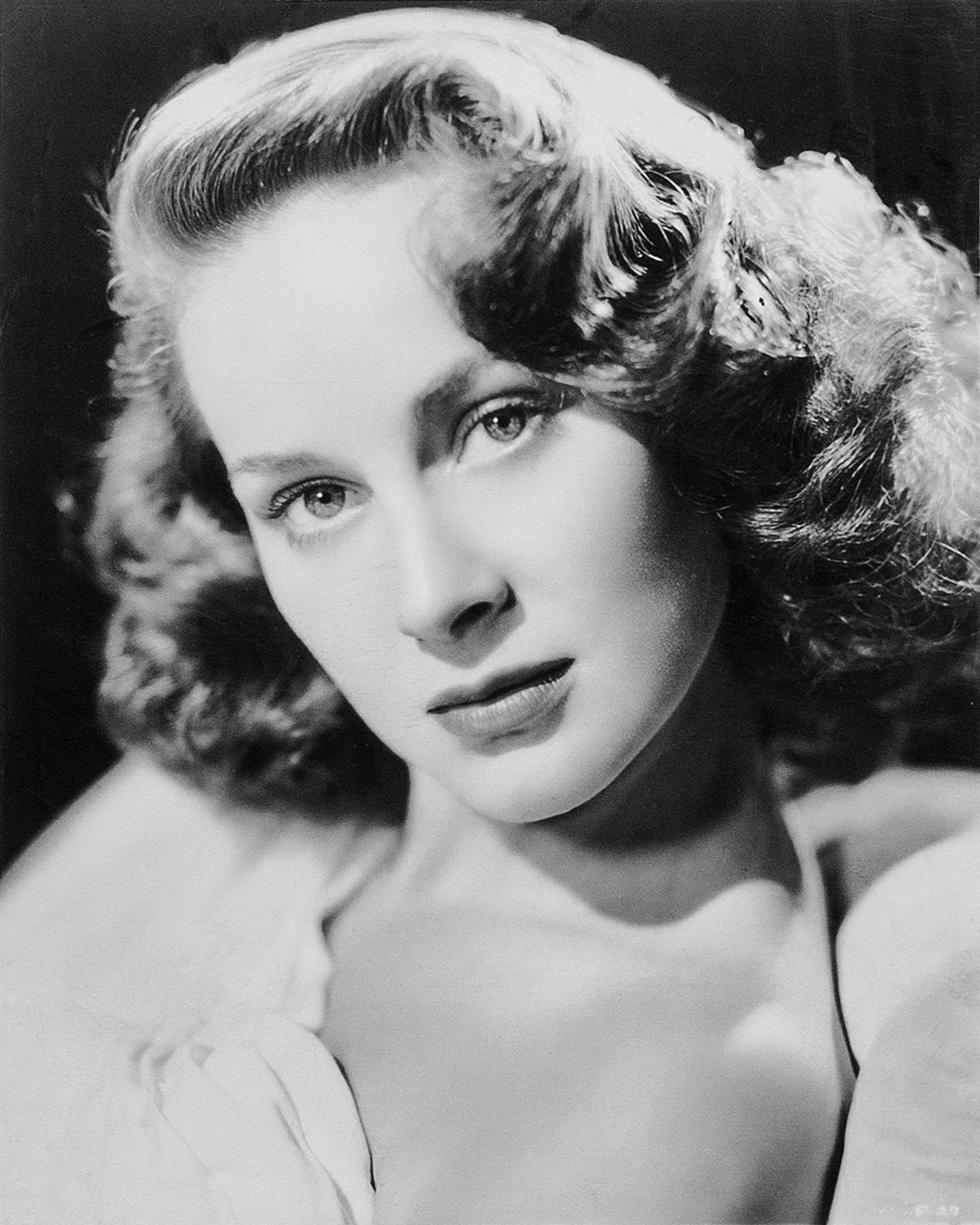
Alida Valli

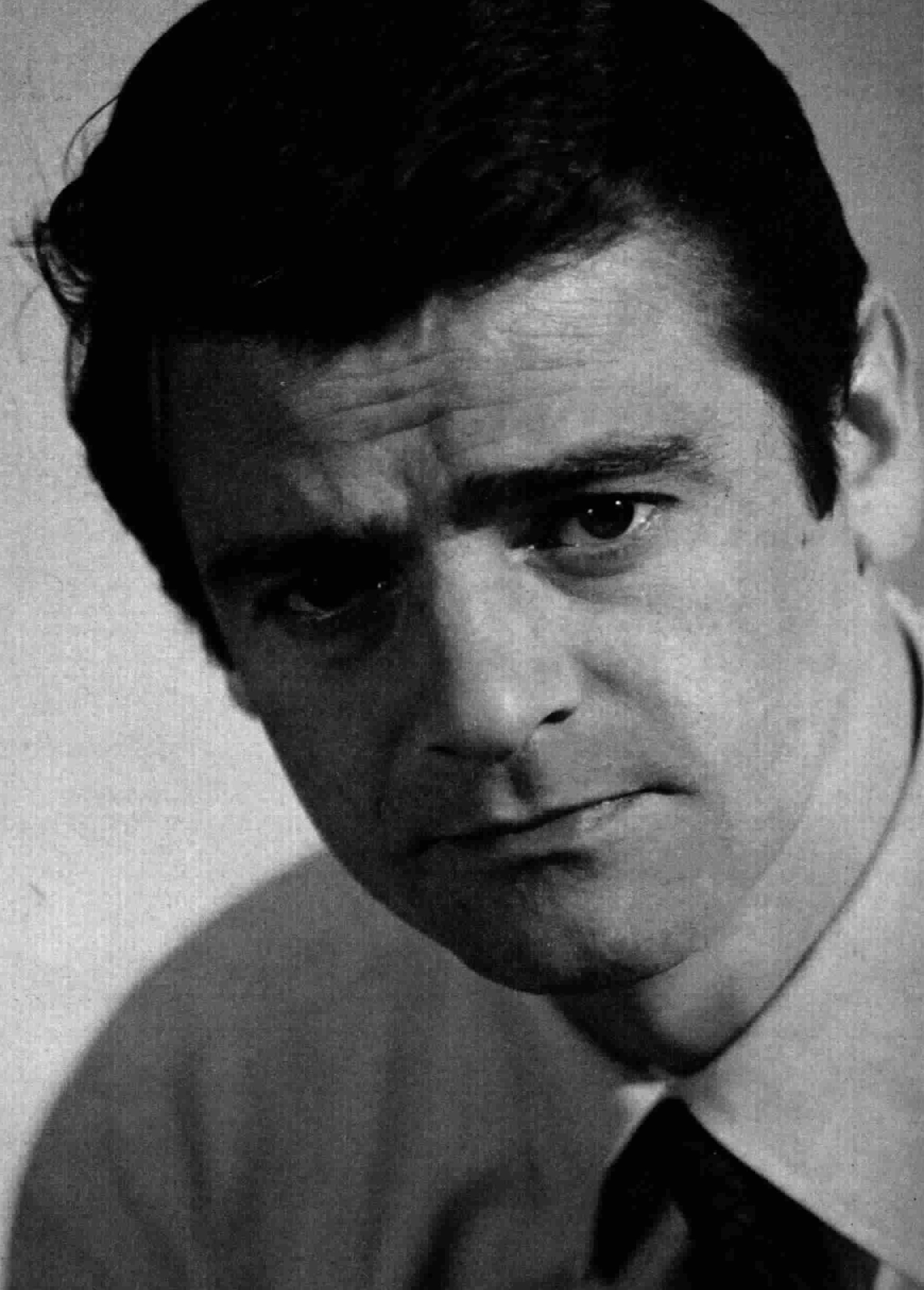
Sergio Endrigo

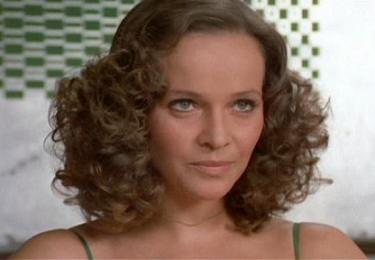
Laura Antonelli

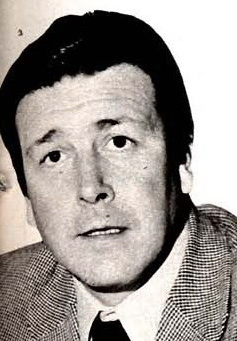
Fulvio Tomizza

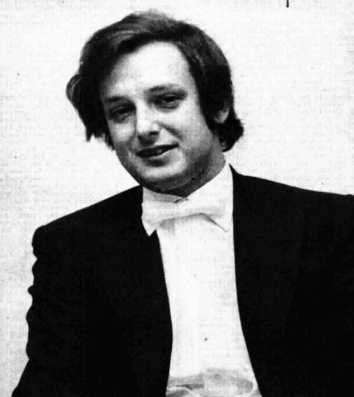
Dino Ciani

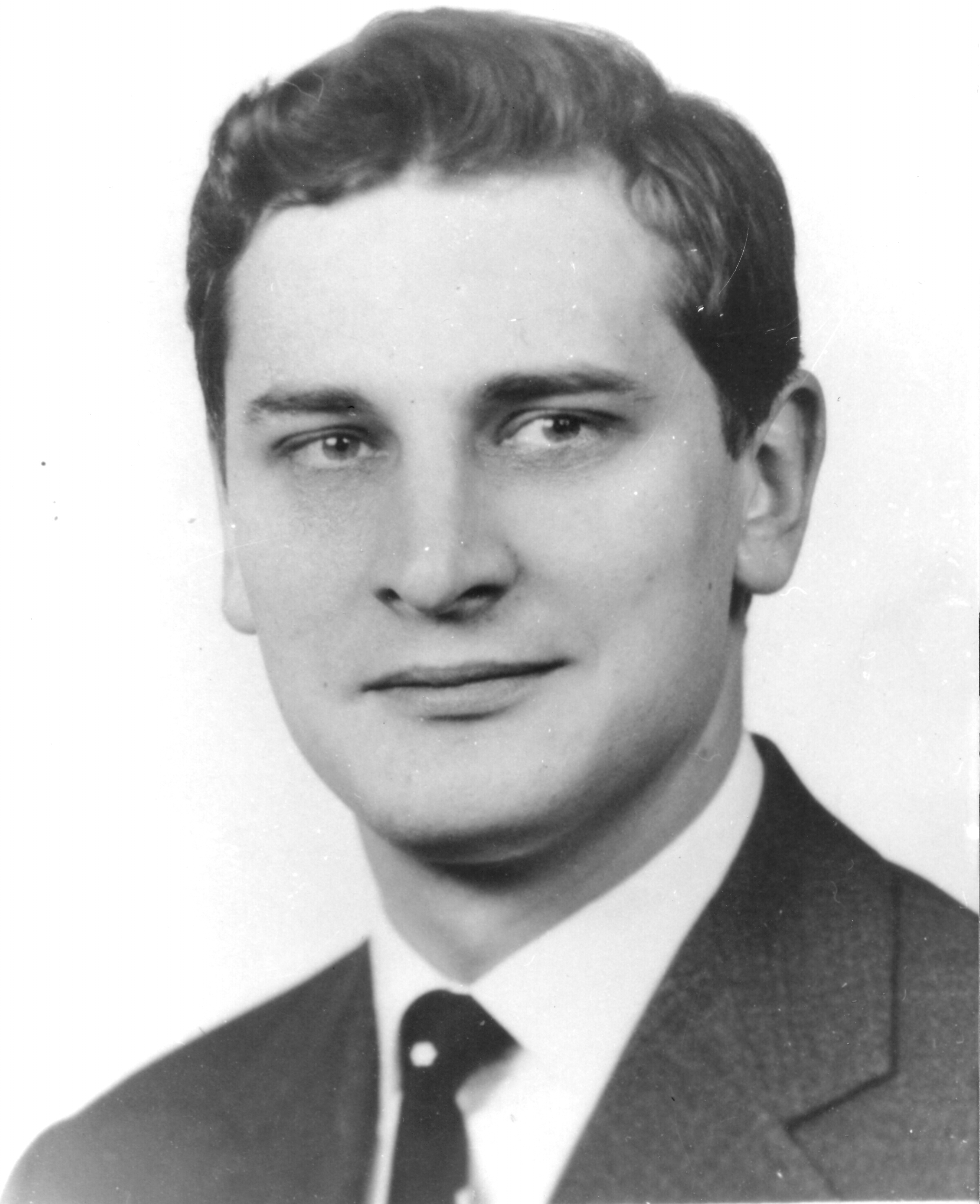
Luciano Fonda

List of notable Istrian Italians across the centuries.

=== Science ===
- Bartolomeo Biasoletto (Vodnjan), pharmacist
- Attilio Colacevich (Rijeka), astronomer
- Umberto D'Ancona, (Rijeka), biologist
- Luciano Fonda (Pula), theoretical physicist
- Giuseppe Furlani (Pula), archaeologist
- Antonio Grossich (Draguć), surgeon
- Domenico Lovisato (Izola), geologist
- Santorio Santorio (Koper), inventor of clinical thermometer and physician

=== Music and arts ===
- Andrea Antico (Motovun), music editor and composer of the Renaissance
- Erma Bossi (Pula), painter
- Domenico da Capodistria (Koper), architect
- Dino Ciani (Rijeka), pianist
- Giulio Clovio (Grižane), Croatian painter, born as Juraj Julije Klović
- Luigi Dallapiccola (Pazin), composer
- Gino De Finetti (Pazin), painter
- Cesare Dell'Acqua (Piran), painter
- Renato Dionisi (Rovinj), composer
- Sergio Endrigo (Pula), singer-songwriter
- Enrico Fonda (Rijeka), painter
- Attilio Micheluzzi (Umag), comics artist
- Giuseppe Pagano (Poreč), architect
- Bernardo Parentino (Poreč), painter
- Ottavio Scotti (Umag), art director
- Antonio Smareglia (Pula), opera composer
- Roberto Soffici (Pula), songwriter
- Giuseppe Tartini (Piran), music composer and violinist
- Francesco Trevisani (Koper), Rococo painter
- Romolo Venucci, (Rijeka), painter

=== Literature and writing ===
- Giovanni Arpino (Pula), writer and journalist
- Matteo Bartoli (Labin), linguist
- Lidia Bastianich (Pula), chef, author and restaurateur
- Gian Rinaldo Carli (Koper), economist
- Lina Galli (Poreč), writer
- Nelida Milani (Pula), writer
- Anna Maria Mori (Pula), journalist
- Sergio Noja Noseda (Pula), professor of Arabic language
- Pier Antonio Quarantotti Gambini (Pazin), writer
- Fulvio Tomizza (Umag), international writer
- Leo Valiani (Rijeka), historian
- Pier Paolo Vergerio (Koper), Reformer and Humanist
- Pier Paolo Vergerio the Elder (Koper), humanist

=== Religion ===
- Matteo Barbabianca (Koper), prelate
- Francesco Bonifacio (Piran), martyr priest beatified
- Egidio Bullesi (Pula), member from the Secular Franciscan Order
- Nicolò Cortese (Cres), priest
- Antonio Elio (Koper), prelate
- Eugenio Ravignani (Pula), bishop
- Antonio Santin (Rovinj), bishop

=== Politics ===
- Marino Baldini (Poreč), Croatian politician
- Mario Blasich (Rijeka), politician
- Giovanni de Ciotta (Rijeka), politician
- Luciano Delbianco (Rovinj), Croatian politician
- Aurelio Juri (Pula), Slovenian politician, Member of European Parliament
- Ivan Pauletta (Premantura), Italian politician and writer active in Croatia
- Pietro Polani (Pula), Doge of Venice
- Furio Radin (Pula), Croatian politician representing Italian national minority
- Rossana Rossanda (Pula), politician
- Vittorio Vidali (Muggia), politician
- Riccardo Zanella (Rijeka), politician
- Adriano Sansa (Pula), politician, former Mayor of Genoa (article in Italian)

=== Cinema ===
- Laura Antonelli (Pula), international film actress
- Femi Benussi (Rovinj), national film actress
- Lilia Dale (Pula), film actress
- Massimo Dobrovic (Pula), international film actor
- Oretta Fiume (Rijeka), film actress
- Antonio Gandusio (Rovinj), film actor
- Aldo Lado (Rijeka), film director
- Romano Scavolini (Rijeka), film director
- Alida Valli (Pula), international film actress

=== Sport ===
- Silvano Abbà (Rovinj), pentathlete
- Albano Albanese (Poreč), hurdler
- Aldo Andretti, (Motovun), American racing driver
- Mario Andretti (Motovun), international automobile racing driver
- Nino Benvenuti (Izola), professional boxing champion, Olympic gold medal in 1960
- Fausto Budicin (Pula), Croatian football player
- Luigi Busidoni (Pula), football player
- Francesco Carpenetti (Vrsar), football player
- Giovanni Cernogoraz (Koper), Croatian shooter, Olympic gold medal in 2012
- Giovanni Cucelli (Rijeka), tennis player
- Giliante D'Este (Izola), rower
- Luigi De Manincor (Rovinj), sailor
- Giovanni Delise (Izola), rower
- Riccardo Divora (Koper), rower
- Samanta Fabris (Pula), Croatian volleyball player
- Mitja Gasparini (Izola), Slovenian volleyball player
- Aredio Gimona (Izola), football player
- Ezio Loik (Rijeka), football player
- Paolo Marinelli (Rijeka) – Croatian basketball player
- Eva Mori (Kanal ob Soči), Slovenian volleyball player
- Mario Novelli (Pula), basketball player
- Rodolfo Ostromann (Pula), Austrian football player
- Valentino Pellarini (Koper), basketball player
- Giuseppe Perentin (Izola), swimmer
- Valerio Perentin (Izola), rower
- Renato Petronio (Piran), rower
- Antonio Quarantotto (Vrsar), swimmer
- Nicolò Rode (Mali Lošinj), sailor
- Orlando Sain (Pula), football player
- Elvis Scoria (Pula), Croatian football manager
- Ulderico Sergo (Rijeka), boxer
- Orlando Sirola (Rijeka), tennis player
- Agostino Straulino (Mali Lošinj), sailor
- Rodolfo Tommasi (Opatija) – football player
- Ernesto Vidal (Buje), Italians/Uruguayan football player
- Nicolò Vittori (Izola), rower
- Rodolfo Volk (Rijeka), football player
- Vittorio Zucca (Pula), sprinter

=== War ===
- Fabio Filzi (Pazin), Italian patriot and irredentist
- Lucrezio Gravisi (Koper), freelance soldier
- Antonio Marceglia (Piran), Frogman and hero of WWII
- Nazario Sauro (Koper), Italian patriot and irredentist
- Spartaco Schergat (Koper), Frogman and hero of WWII
- Licio Visintini (Pula), naval officer
- Mario Visintini (Poreč), aircraft pilot

=== Others ===
- Romano Alquati (Klana), sociologist
- Lidia Bastianich (Pula), chef
- Giuseppina Martinuzzi (Labin), pedagogue

== See also ==
- Istria
- Istrian-Dalmatian exodus
- Free Territory of Trieste
- Dalmatian Italians
- Istriot language
- Istro-Romanians
- Italianization
- Slavicisation

== Bibliography ==
- Antolini, Nicola. Slavi e Latini in Istria tra cinquecento e novecento: origini storiche e problemi del contesto multietnico istriano. Magazine "Storicamente". n. 2, 2006
- Bartoli, Matteo. Le parlate italiane della Venezia Giulia e della Dalmazia. Tipografia italo-orientale. Grottaferrata 1919.
- Benussi, Bernardo. L' Istria nei suoi due millenni di storia. Treves-Zanichelli. Trieste 1924.
- Monzali, Luciano (2016). "A Difficult and Silent Return: Italian Exiles from Dalmatia and Yugoslav Zadar/Zara after the Second World War". Balcanica (47): 317–328. doi:10.2298/BALC1647317M. hdl:11586/186368.
- Mommsen Theodore. The Provinces of the Roman Empire. Barnes & Noble Books. New York, 1996 ISBN 0-7607-0145-8
- Perselli, Guerrino. I censimenti della popolazione dell'Istria, con Fiume e Trieste, e di alcune città della Dalmazia tra il 1850 e il 1936. Centro di ricerche storiche - Rovigno, Trieste - Rovigno 1993.
- Pirjevec, Jože; Kacin-Wohinz, Milica. Storia degli sloveni in Italia, 1866-1998. Marsilio, Venezia 1998.
- Petacco, Arrigo. L'esodo, la tragedia negata degli italiani d'Istria, Dalmazia e Venezia Giulia. Mondadori, Milano, 1999.
- Pradelli, A. Il silenzio di una minoranza: gli italiani in Istria dall'esodo al post-comunismo 1945–2004. Lo Scarabeo Editoriale. Bologna, 2004.
- Seton-Watson, Italy from Liberalism to Fascism, 1870-1925. John Murray Publishers, Londra 1967.
- Vignoli, Giulio. I territori italofoni non appartenenti alla Repubblica Italiana. Giuffrè, Milano, 1995.
- Tomaz, Luigi. Il confine d'Italia in Istria e Dalmazia. Duemila anni di storia. Think ADV, Conselve 2007.
- Ezio e Luciano Giuricin (2015) Mezzo secolo di collaborazione (1964–2014) Lineamenti per la storia delle relazioni tra la Comunità italiana in Istria, Fiume e Dalmazia e la Nazione madre
