= Josip Crnobori =

Croatian painter

- Born: 22 October 1907; Banjole, Austria-Hungary
- Died: 12 August 2005 (aged 97); Zagreb, Croatia
- Known for: Painting

Josip Crnobori (born in Banjole near Pula on 22 October 1907 - died 12 August 2005) was a Croatian painter.

Crnobori was born near Pula in Istria in 1907, but his family moved to Vienna in 1915 where he attended primary school. He came to Zagreb in 1925 and by 1936 he finished art academy.

He had his first independent exhibition in 1937 with Pola vijeka hrvatske umjetnosti, which was held at the Meštrović Pavilion. In 1942 his work was featured among the Croatian exhibits at the Venice Biennale. Over the course of the Second World War he had exhibitions in Berlin, Vienna and Bratislava. He painted a portrait for Croatian leader Ante Pavelić at his request, which Pavelić later declined.

In 1946, Crnobori escaped the newly established Communist Yugoslavia and went to Italy. The following year he moved to Argentina where he lived until 1978. He subsequently moved to New York City in the United States of America. Here he painted Milka Trnina for the Metropolitan Opera and also left several works for the Croatian diaspora.

Crnobori returned to Croatia in 1999 before dying in 2005.
