= Fonda (surname) =

Fonda is a surname. Notable people with the surname include:

- Bridget Fonda (born 1964), American film actress
- Douw Fonda (1700–1780), early settler in the Mohawk Valley, New York
- Enrico Fonda (1892–1929), Italian artist
- Gloria Fonda (1896–1978), American film actress
- Henry Fonda (1905–1982), American stage and film actor
- Jane Fonda (born 1937), American film actress
- Joe Fonda (born 1954), American musician
- Lorenzo Fonda (born 1979), Italian-American film director and artist
- Luciano Fonda (1931–1998), Italian physicist
- Mary Alice Fonda (1837–1897; pen name, "Octavia Hensel"), American musician, linguist, author, critic
- Olga Fonda (born 1982), Russian-American actress and model (née Olga Tchakova)
- Pavel Fonda (born 1942), Italian psychiatrist
- Peter Fonda (1940–2019), American film actor
