= Ivan Pauletta =

Croatian politician and writer (1936–2017)

Member of the Croatian Parliament for the Italian national minority
- In office 1993–1997

President of the Istrian Democratic Assembly
- In office 14 February 1990 – 31 December 1990
- Preceded by: Office established
- Succeeded by: Elio Martinčić (acting); Ivan Jakovčić

Personal details
- Born: 22 December 1936 Promontore, Italy (modern-day Premantura, Croatia)
- Died: 18 March 2017 (aged 81) Pula, Croatia
- Party: Istrian Democratic Assembly (1990–2017)
- Education: University of Zagreb

Ivan Corrado Pauletta (22 December 1936 – 18 March 2017) was an Istrian Italian politician, journalist and writer active in Croatia.

== Biography ==
In his career Pauletta ranged from being a craftsman, a director of a factory in Pula that supplied souvenir producers in Medjugorje, to a politician and a member of the Croatian Parliament.

=== Early life ===
Pauletta was born in Premantura: a village in the municipality of Medulin, in the southern part of Istrian peninsula, then part of the Kingdom of Italy. He lived in Ventimiglia until 1946, near the Italian border with France, where his father had a job at Italian customs.

=== Politician ===
He officially entered politics in 1982, when Pauletta was elected representative of craftsmen in the Associated Labor Council of the Croatian Parliament in Socialist Republic of Croatia, then part of the SFR Yugoslavia. He continued to deal with politics in a local newspaper in Rijeka, with which he began to collaborate in 1988. In 1990 he was among the founders of the Istrian Democratic Assembly, a political party founded on the eve of first multi-party elections in the independent Croatia. In the same year he went to Italy to work and in 1993 Pauletta returned to Croatia where he became a deputy of the Croatian Parliament or Sabor. In 1997 he retired from politics to pursue writing.

He is also known for the project "Terra d'Istria", or "Histria Terra", which claims an even greater autonomy of Istria from the central government of Zagreb. However, the project was never carried out, and it was indeed a reason for harsh criticism of Pauletta, accused of being an irredentist close to Italian far-right circles.

=== Writer ===
He graduated in mechanical engineering in 1964 in Zagreb, the capital of Croatia, then part of the Socialist Federal Republic of Yugoslavia and in the following years after bachelor's degree, he made scientific publications regarding mechanical engineering, and he worked as an occasional teacher at the Faculty of Mechanical Engineering in Zenica, Bosnia and Herzegovina.

At the end of 1999 he published his first book "Histria Collage" or "Histrija Kolaz" in both languages: Italian and Croat. In 2005 he published his second book "The fugitive". With a group of authors in 2007, he published a monograph about Premantura. His other book is titled "Stories of Istria", published in 2009. In 2014 Pauletta wrote his last book "Mladić iz stoljeća prošlog" which translates as The young man of the last century.

== See also ==
- Istrian identity
- Luciano Delbianco
- Furio Radin
