= Fonda =

Fonda may refer to:

== People ==
- Fonda (surname)
- Fonda Lee, Canadian-American fiction author
- Fonda Metassa, Australian rugby league footballer

== Places ==
=== United States ===
- Fonda, Iowa, in Pocahontas County
- Fonda, New York, in Montgomery County
- Fonda, North Dakota, an unincorporated community

== Other uses ==
- Fonda (band), an American indie pop band
- Fonda (U.S. Supreme Court case), an 1886 case (117 U.S. 516)
