= Vinkuran =

Vinkuran Vincural
- Village
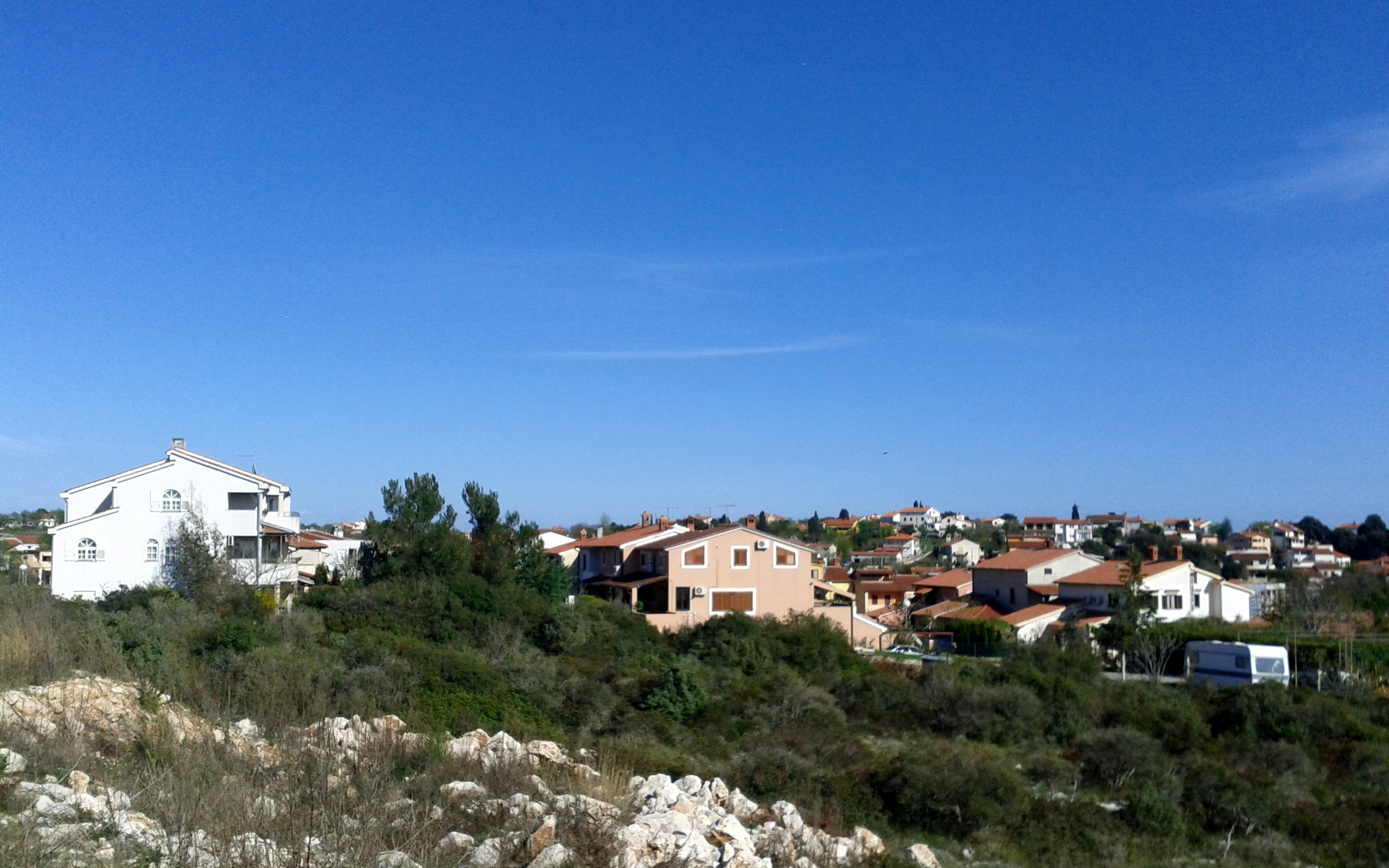

- Location within Croatia
- Coordinates: 44°49′48″N 13°51′36″E
- Country: Croatia
- County: Istria County
- Municipality: Medulin

Area
  - Total: 0.73 sq mi (1.9 km^{2})
- Elevation: 95 ft (29 m)

Population (2021)
  - Total: 652
  - Density: 890/sq mi (340/km^{2})
- Time zone: UTC+1 (CET)
  - Summer (DST): UTC+2 (CEST)
- Postal code: 52100 Pula
- Area code: 052

Vinkuran (Italian: Vincural) is a village in the municipality of Medulin-Medolino, in southern Istria in Croatia.

== Demographics ==
According to the 2021 census, its population was 652. In 2011 it had a population of 672.
