= Valbonaša =

- Village
- Location within Croatia
- Coordinates: 44.8433094°N 13.8687805°E
- Country: Croatia
- County: Istria County
- Municipality: Medulin

Area
  - Total: 0.39 sq mi (1.0 km^{2})

Population (2021)
  - Total: 51
  - Density: 130/sq mi (51/km^{2})
- Time zone: UTC+1 (CET)
  - Summer (DST): UTC+2 (CEST)
- Postal code: 52100 Pula
- Area code: 052

Valbonaša is a village in the municipality of Medulin, in southern Istria in Croatia.

== Demographics ==
According to the 2021 census, its population was 51.
