= Vintijan =

Vintijan Vintian
- Village
- Location within Croatia
- Coordinates: 44°50′42″N 13°51′36″E
- Country: Croatia
- County: Istria County
- Municipality: Medulin

Area
  - Total: 0.27 sq mi (0.7 km^{2})

Population (2021)
  - Total: 186
  - Density: 690/sq mi (270/km^{2})
- Time zone: UTC+1 (CET)
  - Summer (DST): UTC+2 (CEST)
- Postal code: 52100 Pula
- Area code: 052

Vintijan (Italian: Vintian) is a village in the municipality of Medulin-Medolino, in southern Istria in Croatia.

== Demographics ==
According to the 2021 census, its population was 186. In 2011 it had a population of 126.
