= Pješčana Uvala =

Pješčana Uvala Valsabbion
- Village
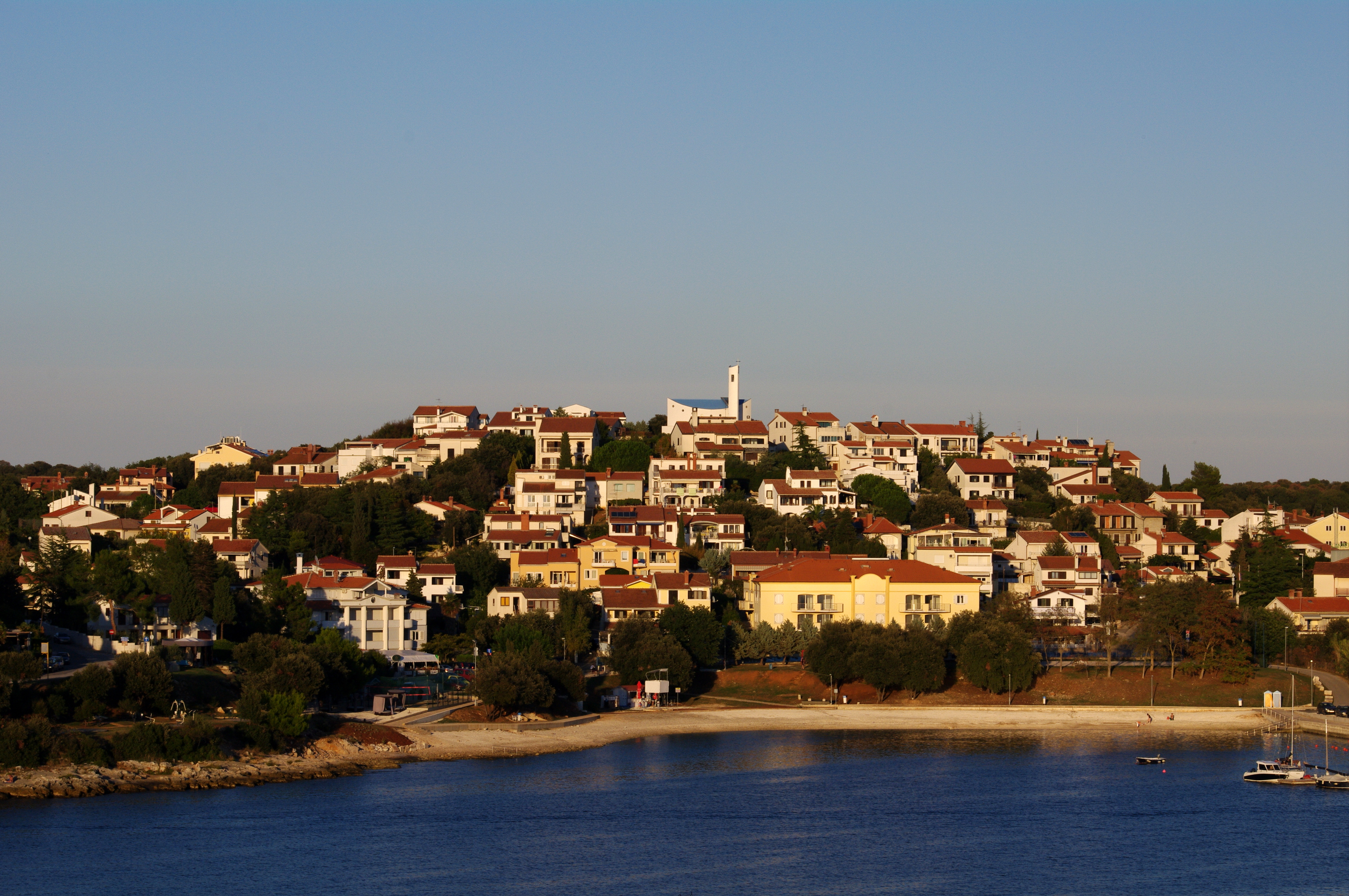

- Location within Croatia
- Coordinates: 44°50′13″N 13°50′56″E
- Country: Croatia
- County: Istria County
- Municipality: Medulin

Area
  - Total: 0.39 sq mi (1.0 km^{2})

Population (2021)
  - Total: 565
  - Density: 1,500/sq mi (570/km^{2})
- Time zone: UTC+1 (CET)
  - Summer (DST): UTC+2 (CEST)
- Postal code: 52100 Pula
- Area code: 052

Pješčana Uvala (Italian: Valsabbion) is a village in the municipality of Medulin-Medolino, in southern Istria in Croatia.

== Demographics ==
According to the 2021 census, its population was 565. In 2011 it had a population of 606.
