= Ivan Jakovčić =

Croatian politician (born 1957)

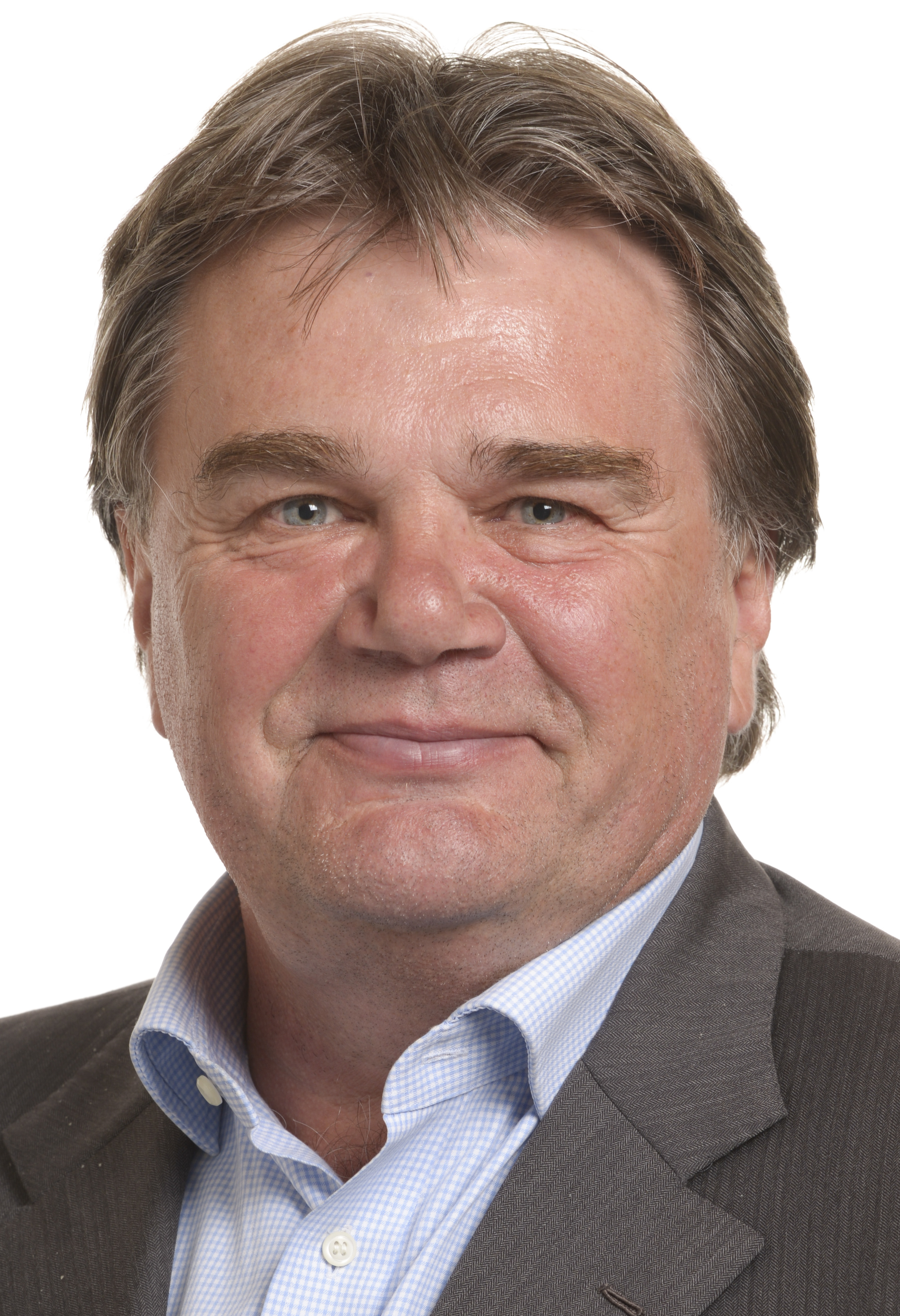

Minister of European Integration
- In office 27 January 2000 – 21 June 2001
- Prime Minister: Ivica Račan
- Preceded by: Ljerka Mintas-Hodak
- Succeeded by: Neven Mimica

Prefect of the Istria County
- In office 24 July 2001 – 7 June 2013
- Preceded by: Stevo Žufić
- Succeeded by: Valter Flego

President of the Istrian Democratic Assembly
- In office 14 February 1991 – 1 January 2014
- Preceded by: Ivan Pauletta; Elio Martinčić (acting)
- Succeeded by: Boris Miletić

Personal details
- Born: 15 November 1957 (age 68) Poreč, PR Croatia, FPR Yugoslavia (modern Croatia)
- Party: Istrian Democratic Assembly
- Domestic partner: Dubravka Svetličić
- Children: 3
- Education: University of Zagreb

Ivan Jakovčić (born 15 November 1957) is a Croatian politician who served as prefect of Istria County from 2001 to 2013.

== Political career ==
After finishing primary and secondary education in Poreč, Jakovčić graduated from the University of Zagreb Faculty of Foreign Trade in 1980. In the 1980s Jakovčić worked in exports and marketing divisions of the Istrian company Pazinka and after that became an entrepreneur and took part in investments in Austria and Croatia. In 1991 he entered politics and was elected chairman of the Istrian Democratic Assembly (IDS), an Istrian regional party.

He was elected to the Croatian Parliament five times, in the 1992, 1995 and 2000 elections. After the opposition won the 2000 elections IDS formed a coalition with the Social Democratic Party of Croatia (SDP) and several other parties, and Jakovčić was appointed minister of the newly established Ministry of European Integration.

However, when IDS decided to leave the ruling coalition in 2001 he resigned and ran in the local elections held the same year. After IDS won the local elections, Jakovčić became the head of the Istria County, position he held until 2013 after being re-elected in 2005 and 2009.

Jakovčić is also the longest serving party chairman in modern Croatia, having been leader of IDS continuously since 1991. His sixth consecutive term as head of IDS was confirmed by acclamation at the party convention held on 14 February 2010.

From 2014 until 2019, Jakovčić was a Member of the European Parliament.

== Controversy ==
On October 23, 2014, the European Parliament received a request to remove Jakovčić's immunity. He ultimately had his immunity lifted, paving the way for a defamation lawsuit against him to proceed. At the time, he was being pursued by Austrian businessman Georg List who had been attempting to build a polo facility and blamed Dalmatian local authorities for placing obstacles in his way. When asked to comment in July 2014, Jakovčić is alleged to have said “I do not comment on idiots”, prompting the lawsuit.
