= Orlando Sain =

Italian footballer

Personal information
- Full name: Orlando Sain
- Date of birth: 3 February 1912
- Place of birth: Pola, Kingdom of Italy
- Height: 1.80 m (5 ft 11 in)
- Position: Goalkeeper

Senior career*
Years	Team	Apps	(Gls)
1931–1932	Campobasso	0	(0)
1932–1938	L'Aquila	62	(0)
1938–1939	Ambrosiana-Inter	5	(0)
1939–1940	Novara	28	(0)
1940–1941	Ambrosiana-Inter	16	(0)
1941–1943	Genova 1893	53	(0)
1944	Asti	14	(0)
1945–1946	Genoa	24	(0)
- * Club domestic league appearances and goals

Orlando Sain (3 February 1912) was an Italian footballer.

== Honours ==
- Coppa Italia winner: 1938-39
