= Dino Ciani =

Italian pianist (1941–1974)

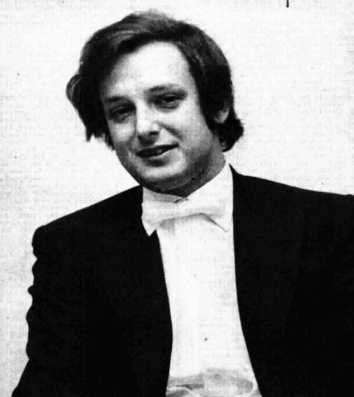
- Born: 16 June 1941; Fiume, Italy (now Rijeka, Croatia)
- Died: 28 March 1974 (aged 32); Rome, Italy
- Occupation: Pianist

Dino Ciani (16 June 1941 – 28 March 1974) was an Italian pianist.

Ciani was born in Fiume (now Rijeka in Croatia) and studied piano with Martha Del Vecchio in Genoa. He obtained his diploma at the Conservatory in Rome at the age of 14 and later, from 1958 to 1962, attended the advanced courses of Alfred Cortot, whom he greatly revered, in Paris, Lausanne and Siena. Cortot described Ciani in most enthusiastic terms: "miraculously gifted ... one of the most remarkable examples of the rarest talents one could hope to find".

Ciani's career began when he won second prize at the Liszt-Bartók Competition in Budapest in 1961. The venues in which he performed included Salle Pleyel, Carnegie Hall and Chicago Philharmonic, Kennedy Center. He made his debut at Teatro alla Scala under the baton of Claudio Abbado with Beethoven's Fourth Piano Concerto in 1968. With Abbado he also performed Prokofiev's Fifth Piano Concerto in 1968 at RAI Auditorium in Rome (then also at La Scala) and Mozart's D minor Concerto at the Salzburger Mozarteum. Ciani also played with the young Riccardo Muti Beethoven's Choral Fantasy at La Scala and the Second Piano Concerto by Bartók at Milan RAI.

His repertoire was broad and diverse for a pianist of his age. It encompassed the complete sonatas of Beethoven, works by Weber (he was the first to record the complete sonatas, in 1967), Schubert, Schumann, Chopin, Debussy and Bartók. His recordings for Deutsche Grammophon of the complete Debussy Préludes (1972), Schumann's Novellettes (1968) and Weber's second and third piano sonatas (1970) are particularly renowned and belong to the pianistic heritage.

He collaborated with such conductors as Claudio Abbado, Riccardo Muti, Thomas Schippers, John Barbirolli, Gianandrea Gavazzeni and Carlo Maria Giulini. Among his last concerts were renditions of the complete set of Chopin's Nocturnes and Schubert's Winterreise with baritone Claudio Desderi. His final live performance was Beethoven's Third Concerto with Giulini in Chicago and Milwaukee.

Ciani was killed in a road accident in Rome at the age of 32.

The Dino Ciani Piano Competition was created in his memory. Inaugurated in 1975, it is held at Teatro alla Scala. Distinguished members of the jury have included Nikita Magaloff, Martha Argerich, Maurizio Pollini, Lazar Berman, Rudolf Firkušný and Aldo Ciccolini. From 2007 to 2017 there has been a Dino Ciani Festival and Academy at Cortina d'Ampezzo.

== Discography (selection) ==
- Dino Ciani: A Tribute. Haydn: Sonata No. 52 in E flat; Mozart: Fantasia and Sonata in C minor; Beethoven: "Eroica" Variations; Diabelli Variations; Weber: Sonatas Nos. 1–4; Chopin: Etudes (sel.); Schumann: Sonata No. 1; Fantasie in C; Balakirev: Islamey; Bartók: Sonata; Improvisations on Hungarian Peasant Songs; Suite; Scriabin: Preludes (sel.); other works. Dynamic (6 CDs)
- Beethoven: Complete Piano Sonatas. Dynamic (9 CDs)
- Brahms: Concerto No. 1; Liszt: Totentanz; Weber: Sonata No. 2; Debussy: Children's Corner; Bartók: Mikrokosmos VI; Hummel: Sonata Op. 13; Schumann: Kinderszenen; Noveletten; Chopin: Barcarolle. Capital Musica (3 CDs)
- Debussy: Preludes (Books I & II). Deutsche Grammophon (2 CDs; additional works by Debussy played by Tamás Vásáry)
- Beethoven: Piano Concertos Nos. 1 and 3. Orchestra Sinfonica della RAI cond. Vittorio Gui. Doremi (CD)
- Beethoven: Piano Concertos Nos. 1 and 4. Orchestra della Scala cond. Claudio Abbado. Myto (CD)
- Mozart: Piano Concertos. Nos. 20 and 24 cond. Gianandrea Gavazzeni. Dynamic (CD)
- Rossini: Album de Chaumière, Album de Château. Fonit Cetra (CD)
- The Genius of Dino Ciani; Debussy (Préludes), Schumann (Novelettes), von Weber (Piano sonata's 2 and 3), Bartók (Out of Doors, volume 2); Original recordings made by Deutsche Grammophon, Brilliant Classics, 2010, 3CD)
- Complete Deutsche Grammophon recordings, reissued by DG in 2016
