= Bernardo Parentino =

Italian painter (c. 1450 – c. 1500)

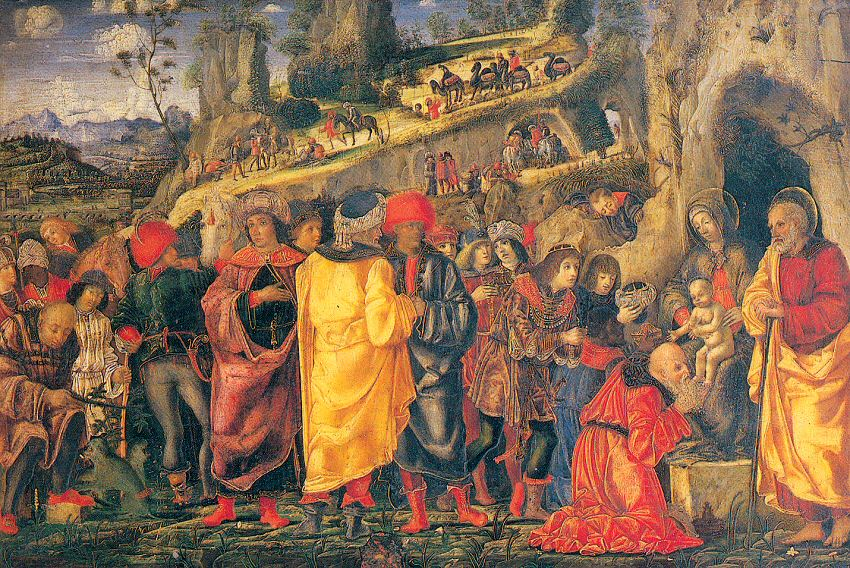
Adoration of the Magi

Bernardo Parentino, also known as Bernardo Parenzano (Italian; Croatian: Bernard Porečan) (c. 1450 – c. 1500) was a painter of the Renaissance period born in the Republic of Venice, active mainly in Padua. To his detriment, he is still being confused and superimposed by another person with the same name, an Augustine monk who took the name Fra Lorenzo (c. 1437–1531) and who died in the Monastery of St. Michael in Vicenza.

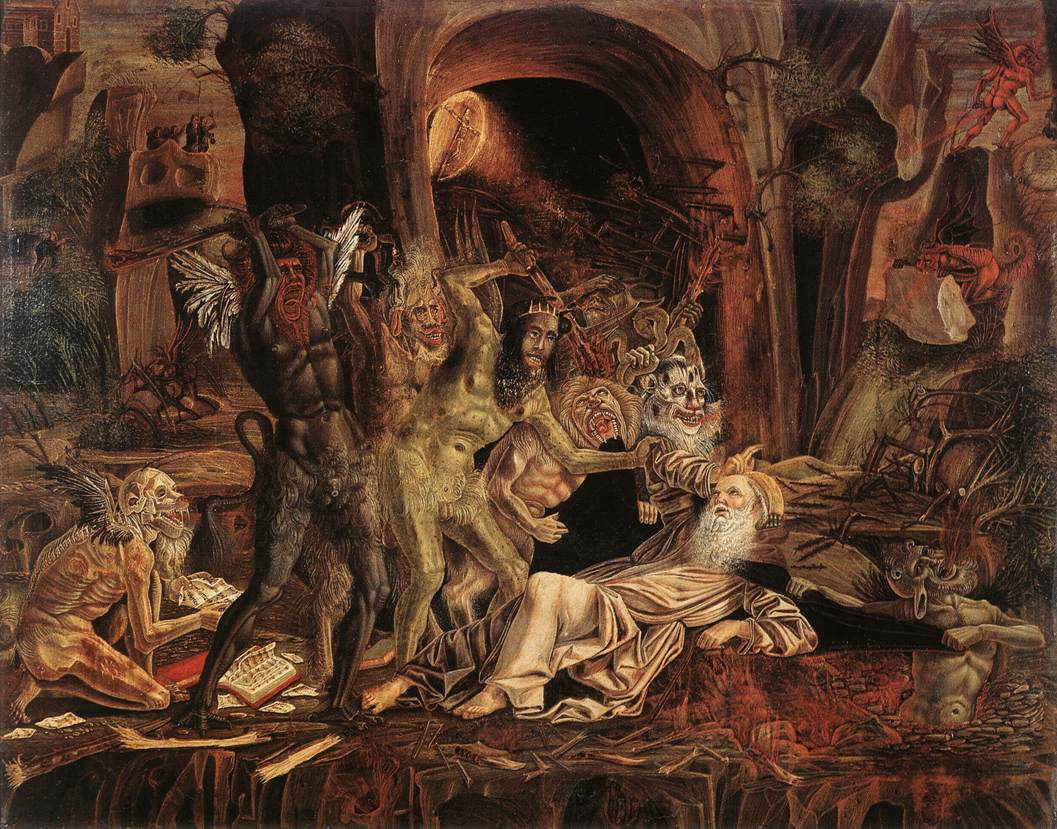
Temptation of St Anthony Abbot

Born in Parenzo, then a Venetian town in Istria and died in Vicenza. He was influenced, if not a pupil, of the painter Andrea Mantegna. He painted Scenes of the life of San Benedetto for the cloister of Santa Giustina at Padua, and a Nativity once at the Accademia Gallery in Venice. An Adoration of the Magi, more indebted to Giovanni Bellini is found at the Louvre Museum He painted a nightmarish Temptation of St Anthony Abbot found at the Doria Pamphilj Gallery. Also known as Bernardo da Parenzo or Parenzano.

A catalogue of attributed paintings was listed in 1908, noting he was often confused with contemporaries of the school of Ferrara.
