= Premantura =

Premantura Promontore
- Village
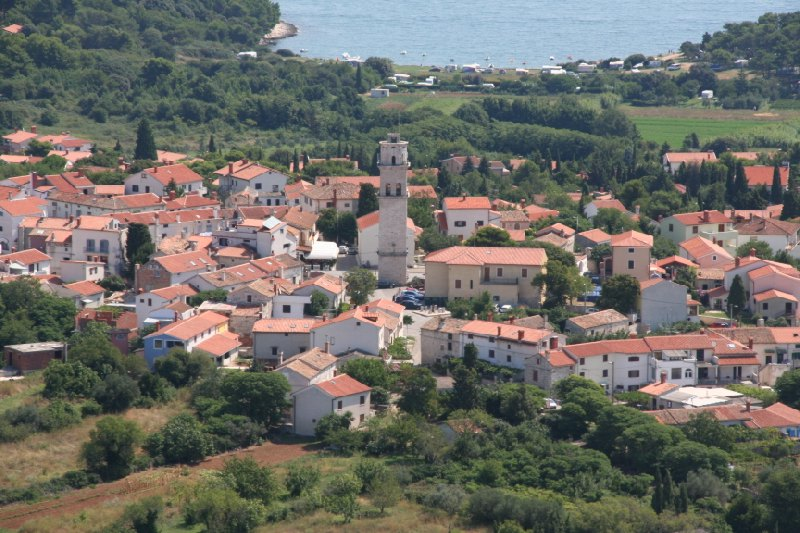

- Location within Croatia
- Coordinates: 44°52′N 13°51′E
- Country: Croatia
- County: Istria County
- Municipality: Medulin

Area
  - Total: 2.6 sq mi (6.8 km^{2})
- Elevation: 69 ft (21 m)

Population (2021)
  - Total: 819
  - Density: 310/sq mi (120/km^{2})
- Time zone: UTC+1 (CET)
  - Summer (DST): UTC+2 (CEST)
- Postal code: 52100 Pula
- Area code: 052

Premantura (Italian: Promontore) is a small village in the municipality of Medulin in Istria, on the southernmost tip of the Istrian Peninsula, just south of the city of Pula-Pola. A short distance from Premantura is Cape Kamenjak – a small peninsula consisting of more than 30 km of coastline with several coves and beaches.

In the southernmost part of Istria, on a sliver of land surrounded by the sea, and perched on the top of a hill, there lies a small and ancient village. It had been called Promontorium Polaticum first, then Promontore (Promontore d’Istria) and finally Premantura. Throughout history Premantura and Kamenjak have been exposed to constant changes of government due to the importance and uniqueness of its position. In the 20th century, the inhabitants of Premantura had lived through six different political regimes or states. The inhabitants of Premantura became famous for their ample to catch of a very delicious type of crab. Premantura is naturally connected with the Cape Kamenjak – a small peninsula which was, due to its exceptional beauty and variety of plants and animal species, declared a protected area back in 1996. Kamenjak peninsula is 3400 m long, wide between 500 and 1200 m and includes 30 km of coastline, beautiful bays and beaches, many protected and endemic plant and animal species such as: endemic orchids, butterflies, Mediterranean monk seal, crabs and more. The best evidence about the ancient history of Premantura Kamenjak are the 146 dinosaur footprints found on Kamenjak that are more than 90 million years old.

== Demographics ==
According to the 2021 census, its population was 819. In 2011 it had a population of 768.

== Notable people ==
- Ivan Pauletta (1936–2017), founder of Istrian Democratic Assembly
