= Banjole =

Banjole Bagnole
- Village
- Location within Croatia
- Coordinates: 44°49′30″N 13°51′58″E
- Country: Croatia
- County: Istria County
- Municipality: Medulin

Area
  - Total: 2.0 sq mi (5.2 km^{2})

Population (2021)
  - Total: 958
  - Density: 480/sq mi (180/km^{2})
- Time zone: UTC+1 (CET)
  - Summer (DST): UTC+2 (CEST)
- Postal code: 52100 Pula
- Area code: 052

Banjole (Italian: Bagnole) is a village in the municipality of Medulin, in southern Istria in Croatia.

== Demographics ==
According to the 2021 census, its population was 958. In 2011 it had a population of 983.

== See also ==
- Barbariga, Croatia
