= Egidio Bullesi =

Italian sailor

Venerable Egidio Bullesi TOSF
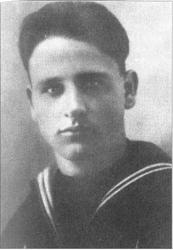

´
- Born: 24 August 1905; Pola, Istria, Kingdom of Italy (modern Croatia)
- Died: 25 April 1929 (aged 23); Pola, Istria, Kingdom of Italy (modern Croatia)

Egidio Bullesi, Egidije Bulešić in Croatianm, (24 August 1905 – 25 April 1929), was an Italian Roman Catholic and a member of the Secular Franciscan Order. Bullesi lived as a refugee during World War I after his hometown was declared a war zone; he did his education in the cities he was forced to relocate to before being able to move back to his hometown following the end of the war. He became a naval officer after being drafted and following that became a draftsman in Pula. He was noted among his colleagues for his enthusiasm in addition to his pious nature. He entered Catholic Action and the Secular Franciscans in 1920 while also working for the Vincentian communities in his region.

The beatification process for Bullesi launched in the 1970s in Trieste and he became titled a Servant of God. The confirmation of Bullesi's life of heroic virtue in 1997 allowed for Pope John Paul II to proclaim Bullesi as venerable.

== Life ==
Egidio Bullesi was born in Pola, Kingdom of Italy, (Pula) on 24 August 1905 as the third of nine children to the poor Francesco Bullesi and Maria Diritti; he was baptized in the Pola Cathedral (Pula Cathedral). His father worked in Pula as a naval technical designer. Two of his siblings were Maria and Giovanni.

The outbreak of World War I in 1914 caused his hometown to be declared a war zone thus resulting in most of the population in the area being deemed refugees due to their internment in Rovinj and then in Graz in 1915. The Bullesis also moved to Szeghedin and Wagna during this period. He was forced to remain with his mother and siblings in relative quiet during this dangerous period while his father was separated from them continuing his work in Pula. He did his schooling from place to place during this period but made the effort to attend evening classes for further education due to disruptions in his studies. He managed to settle in Rovigo for some time.

Bullesi became an apprentice at the docks after he turned thirteen in Pula at the war's end in 1919 after the Bullesi's were able to return to Pula. He later joined Catholic Action (after his sister Maria joined) on 2 July 1920 in addition to joining the Secular Franciscan Order that 4 October - the feast of Saint Francis of Assisi. Upon entering the order he took the religious name Ludovico. The preaching of the Franciscan priest Tito Castagna inspired him so much so that he entered the order soon after. In 1921 he attended the National Congress in Rome for the fiftieth commemoration of the Catholic Youth. Bullesi served in the Italian naval forces after he was drafted into it in February 1925 (serving on the battleship Dante Alighieri) and after he was discharged on 15 March 1927 became a draftsman in the docks at Monfalcone. During his conscription, he worked alongside Guido Foghin who was indifferent to faith and was no longer practising his faith. But his time with Bullesi changed his views on faith so much so that he became a Franciscan priest upon Bullesi's death and served in the Chinese and Guatemalan mission as Father Egidio-Maria. He taught catechism at his local parish and also was known to collaborate from time to time with the Vincentian communities in the area.

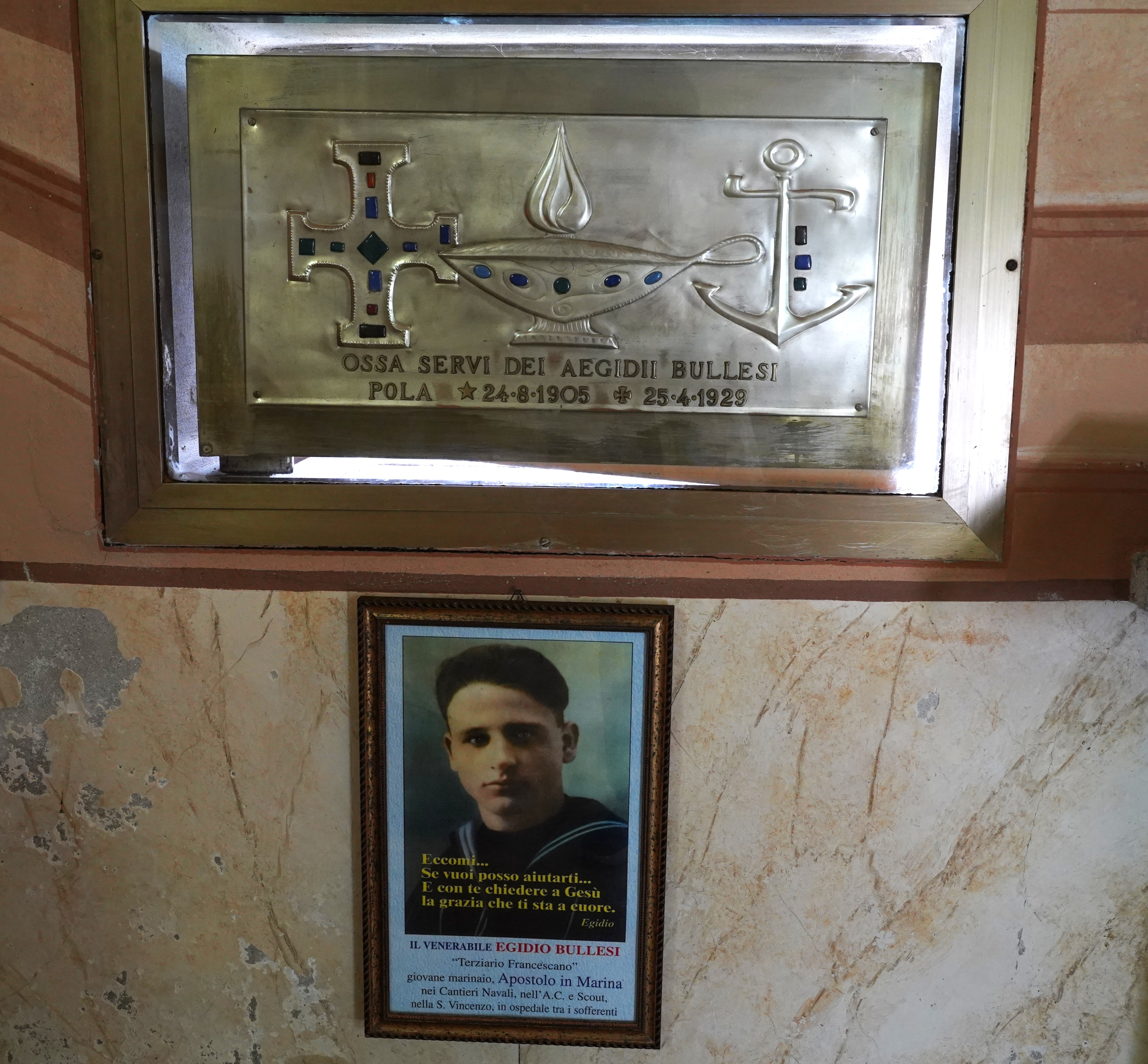
Remains

Bullesi suffered from tuberculosis prompting him to be admitted to hospital in Pula on 29 August 1928. In the hospital, he ministered to those in need despite his condition weakening over time. He died from tuberculosis in the morning on 25 April 1929; he was buried in the Franciscan habit in Pula. His remains were later relocated in 1974 to the island of Barbana near Grado.

== Beatification process ==
The beatification process opened on 23 August 1973 and Bullesi was titled as a Servant of God. The Congregation for the Causes of Saints issued the nihil obstat, therefore enabling for the cause to open in the Trieste diocese. The cognitional process for the investigation opened in Trieste on 6 May 1974 and later concluded on 6 December 1977 at which stage the evidence collected was sent to the Congregation for the Causes of Saints who later validated the process on 10 October 1990.

The postulation later compiled and sent the positio to the Congregation. Pope John Paul II named Bullesi as venerable on 7 July 1997 after confirming that Bullesi had practised heroic virtue. The postulator for this is Giovangiuseppe Califano OFM.
