= Medulin =

Medulin Medolino
- Municipality
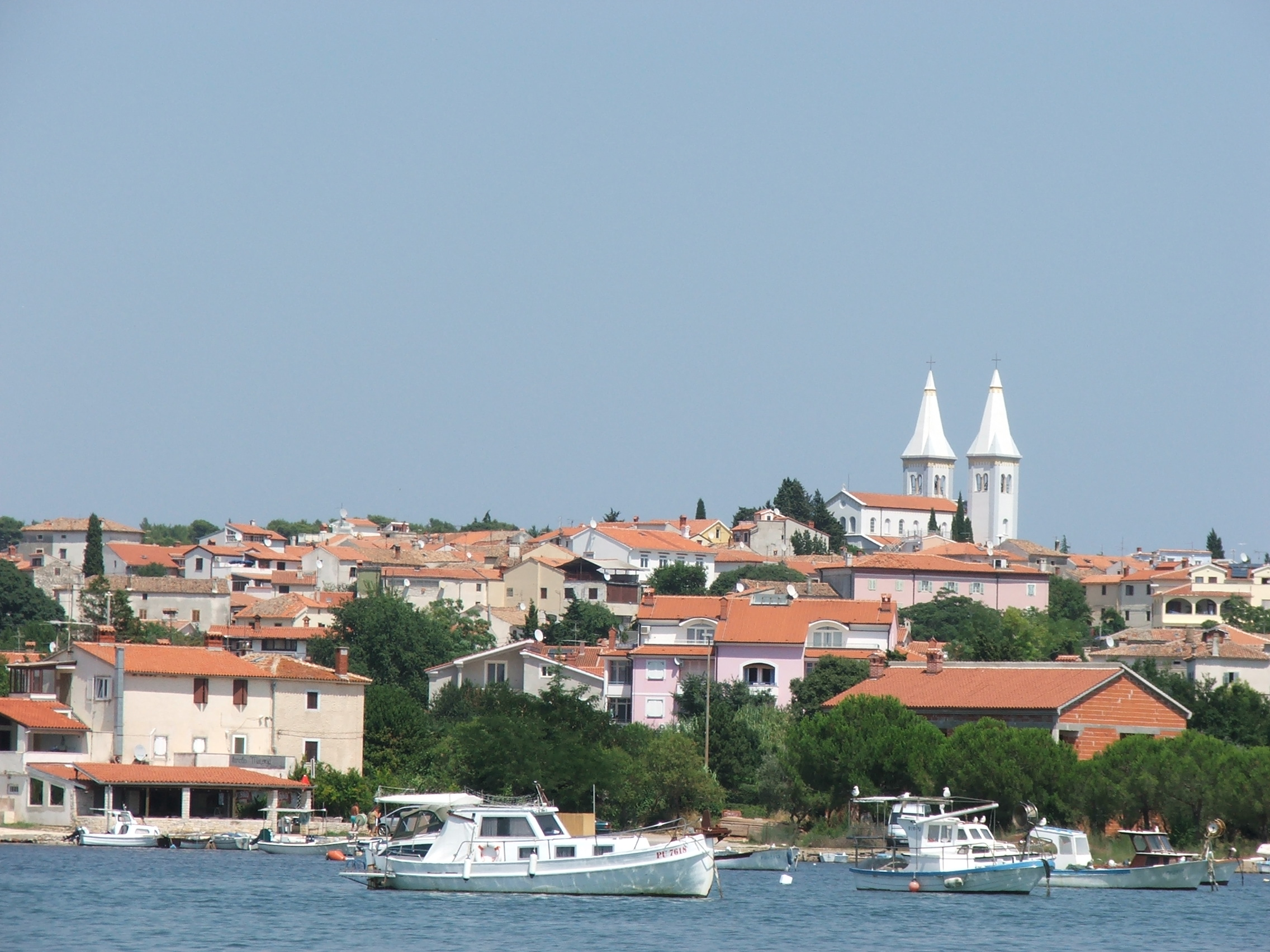
- Medulin, view from port

- Flag

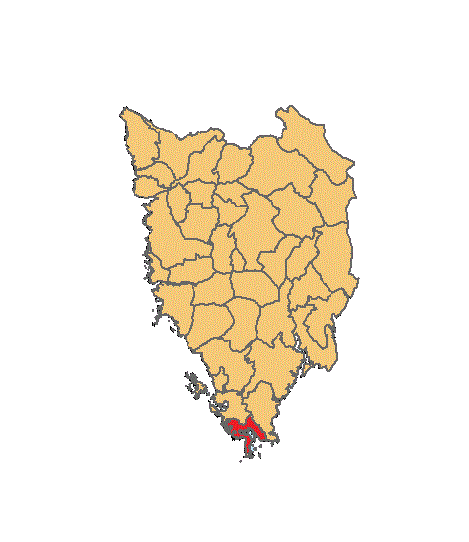
- Location of Medulin in Istria
- Interactive map of Medulin
- Location within Croatia
- Coordinates: 44°49′19″N 13°56′06″E
- Country: Croatia
- County: Istria County

Government
  - Municipal mayor: Ivan Kirac (Ind.)
  - Council: 15 members: • Ind. Goran Buić, IDS, ISU, ZS (11); • SDP (1); • HDZ (1); • Ind. (2)

Area
  - Municipality: 34.1 km^{2} (13.2 sq mi)
  - Urban: 11.0 km^{2} (4.2 sq mi)

Population (2021)
  - Municipality: 6,552
  - Density: 192/km^{2} (498/sq mi)
  - Urban: 2,830
  - Urban density: 257/km^{2} (666/sq mi)
- Time zone: UTC+1 (CET)
  - Summer (DST): UTC+2 (CEST)
- Postal code: 52203 Medulin
- Area code: 52
- Website: medulin.hr

Medulin (Italian: Medolino; Venetian: Medołin) is a municipality in the southern part of the Istrian peninsula in Croatia. Medulin is commonly called the "Tip of Istria".

Medulin is built around a harbour between Cape Kamenjak and Cape Marlera. The town centre is to the northeast of the harbour and includes the main square and the twin-spired St. Agnes Church.

== Demographics ==
According to the 2021 census, its population was 6,552 with 2,830 living in the settlement of Medulin itself.

The municipality consists of the following settlements:

- Banjole, population 958
- Medulin, population 2,830
- Pješčana Uvala, population 565
- Pomer, population 491
- Premantura, population 819
- Valbonaša, population 51
- Vinkuran, population 652
- Vintijan, population 186
Medulin: Population trends 1857–2021
v

population	1506	1854	2071	2502	2905	3288	2752	2837	2085	1966	2126	2039	2443	3407	6004	6481	6552
	1857	1869	1880	1890	1900	1910	1921	1931	1948	1953	1961	1971	1981	1991	2001	2011	2021

Sources: Croatian Bureau of Statistics publications

At the 2011 census the municipality had a population of 6,481, while the settlement proper had 2,777 inhabitants.

== Economy ==
Medulin's economy is based on tourism. During the months of July and August, its population increases to over 10,000 due to an influx of tourists that come to visit Medulin, known for its camping sites and coastline.
