= Enrico Fonda =

Italian painter (1892–1929)

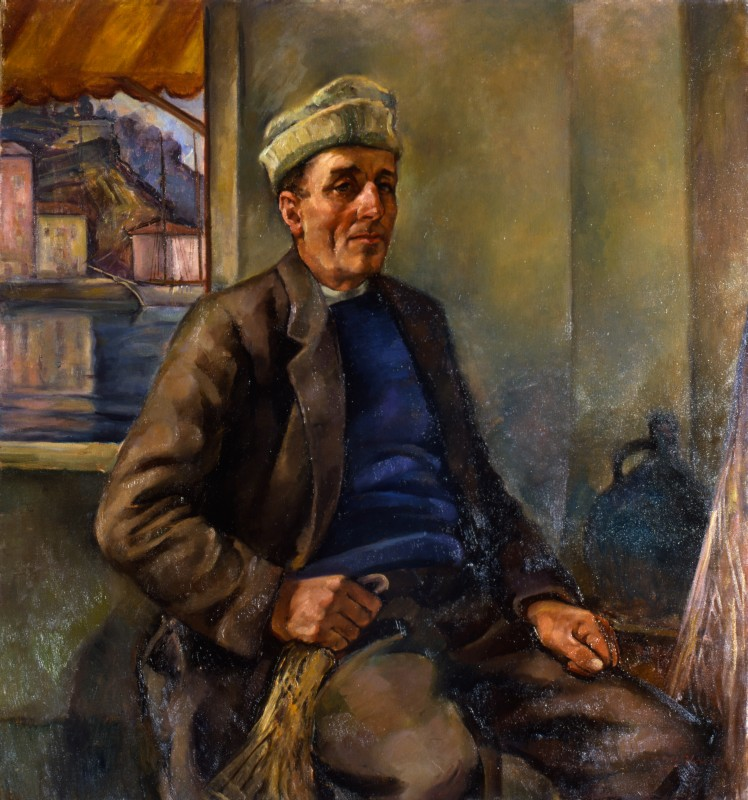
Pescatore, ca. 1925 (Fondazione Cariplo)

Enrico Fonda (1892– 1929) was an Italian painter born in Fiume (now in Croatia).

== Biography ==
Fonda was a student at the art academies of Budapest and Munich when he was a young man. After World War I he visited Florence, where he studied the painting of the Macchiaioli group, and Venice, where came into contact with the Burano School of Art which heavily influenced his later work. He focused above all on landscapes set in the Istria region and began to obtain positive recognition from art critics in 1920 at the exhibitions of the Fondazione Bevilacqua La Masa. He moved to Milan in 1924 and came into contact with the Novecento Italiano movement, taking part in their first group exhibition in 1926 with compositions of greater solidity. Having moved to Paris in 1927, he acquired a much deeper understanding of the work of Paul Cézanne and Pierre Bonnard and exhibited at the Salon d'Automne, on which occasion the French government bought a work now on permanent display in the Centre Pompidou. He died in Paris of pneumonia two years later.

== Other projects ==
Media related to Enrico Fonda at Wikimedia Commons
