= Luciano Fonda =

Italian theoretical physicist

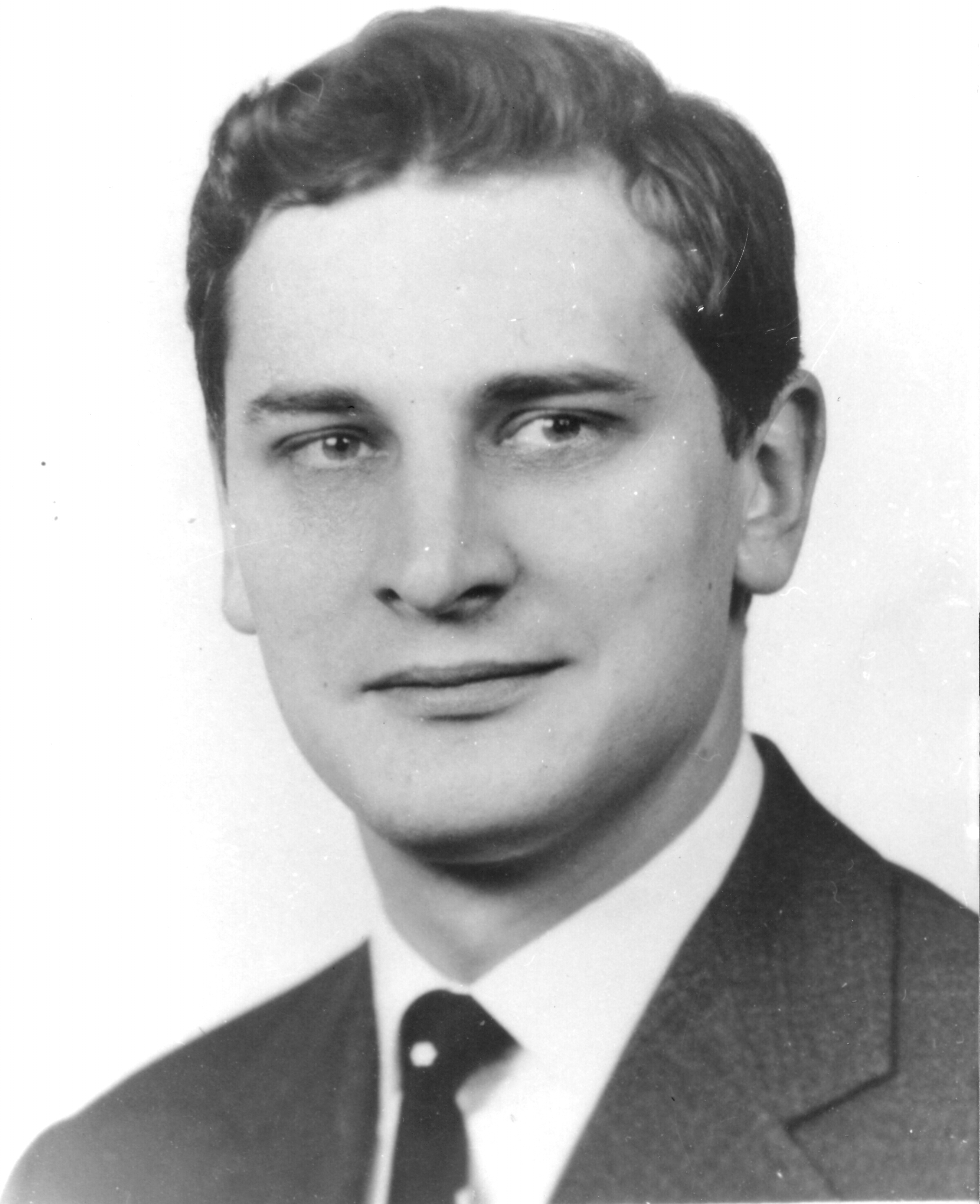
- Fonda in 1961.
- Born: December 12, 1931; Pola, Kingdom of Italy
- Died: July 21, 1998 (aged 66); Skradin, Croatia
- Education: University of Trieste
- Known for: Quantum Zeno effect ELETTRA
- Scientific career
- Fields: Physics
- Workplaces: University of Trieste; Indiana University Bloomington; Institute of Advanced Studies; University of Palermo; University of Parma

Luciano Fonda (12 December 1931 – 21 July 1998) was an Italian theoretical physicist, author of a hundred scientific publications, including a book on quantum symmetries. His research activity covered several areas, from nuclear and subnuclear physics to condensed matter physics.

== Biography ==
Born in Pola, Kingdom of Italy (now Croatia), the events of the war brought his family to Trieste in December 1943. He completed his high school and college studies at the local Dante Alighieri school, before graduating in Physics summa cum laude at the University of Trieste in July 1955.

After becoming a theoretical physics assistant at the University of Trieste, he travelled to the United States of America with a Fulbright Program grant in 1958 to take the position of Research Associate at the Indiana University Bloomington. In 1959 Robert Oppenheimer invited him to become a member of the Institute for Advanced Study in Princeton, New Jersey.

In November 1960 he won an Italian public competition to become a full professor of theoretical physics and returned to Italy in 1961, first to work at the University of Palermo and then at the University of Parma. In November 1963 he moved to the University of Trieste definitively.

== Personal life ==
Luciano Fonda married Thea Arcangeli and had three children.

He died in Skradin, Croatia on 21 July 1998, during a sailing cruise.

== Academic charges ==
Luciano Fonda was the Director of the Advanced School of Physics, which was open to scholarship holders from the International Atomic Energy Agency (IAEA) of Vienna and UNESCO. The School was under his management from 1964 to 1980, when he oversaw the merging of its contents and programmes into the recently born International School for Advanced Studies (Scuola Internazionale Superiore di Studi Avanzati – SISSA). As vice director, Luciano Fonda contributed both found and run SISSA for six years.

He was Director of the Theoretical Physics Institute of the University of Trieste from 1966 to 1969 and Dean of the Faculty of Mathematics, Physics and Natural Sciences from 1991 to 1997. He was also Director of the Consortium for Physics of the University of Trieste from 1980 to 1997 and President of the same Consortium for Physics from 1997. He was a consultant to the Abdus Salam International Centre for Theoretical Physics (ICTP) from its foundation in 1964.

== The Trieste synchrotron ==
Luciano Fonda has often been defined as the ‘father’ of the ELETTRA synchrotron light machine.

From 1980 to 1985 he participated in the Intergovernmental Committee of Brussels responsible for choosing the site on which to build a European 5GeV synchrotron light machine. When the machine was assigned to Grenoble in 1985, he used the experience acquired in those years to develop, along with his collaborator Renzo Rosei, the idea of an Italian machine that would complement the European one. The construction of ELETTRA was completed in October 1993 and it is now operative in Basovizza, on the Triestine Carso. Luciano Fonda was director of the Scientific Division of Synchrotron Trieste from 1987 to 1991 and vice president from 1993.

== Awards ==
For his research activity, he won the Italian Physical Society award in 1960. He was also conferred the title of Associate Member of the Jozef Stefan Institute for his collaboration with the theoretical physics group from the University of Ljubljana.

For the ELETTRA initiative he was conferred the San Giusto d’Oro Prize, in December 1993, an award assigned every year by local reporters to a Triestine who has made the city famous in Italy and the world with his/her work.

Following an initiative led by the Consortium for Physics, the "Luciano Fonda University College" was instituted in Trieste at the beginning of 1999. It began its activity during the academic year of 1999–2000.
