= Suleiman (disambiguation) =

Suleiman is a name. Suleiman may also refer to:

== Places ==
- Sleman Regency, Indonesia
- Suleiman Mountains, Afghanistan and Pakistan
- Suleiman Bridge, a bridge in Osijek
- Suleiman Courts, high-rise apartment building in Kuala Lumpur, Malaysia
- Suleiman Mosque
- Suleiman Mosque (Rhodes)

== Animals ==
- Suleiman (elephant), an elephant named after Suleiman the Magnificent
- Suleiman (horse)

== Other uses ==
- Süleyman (Trinity Blood character), a fictional character in the anime series Trinity Blood
- Suleiman Bhai, a fictional don in the 1999 Indian film Vaastav: The Reality, portrayed by Paresh Rawal

== See also ==
- Sleiman
- Slimane
- Soliman (disambiguation)
- Solomon
- Sulaiman (disambiguation)
- Suleman (disambiguation)
- Sulejman
- Sulayman
- Suleyman
- Süleymanoğlu
- Sulliman
- Islamic view of Solomon
- Suleimani (disambiguation)
