= Slimane =

Slimane or Sliman is a masculine given name of Arabic origin. It is an alternative spelling of Suleiman, with Suleiman being the Arabic version of the name Solomon. The name means "man of peace". Notable people with the name include:

== Given name ==
=== Sliman ===
- Sliman Bensmaia (1973–2023), French-Algerian neuroscientist
- Sliman Kchouk (born 1994), Tunisian footballer
- Sliman Mansour (1947–2026), Palestinian painter
- Sliman Ourak, Tunisian politician

=== Slimane ===
- Slimane of Morocco (1766–1822), Sultan of Morocco
- Slimane (singer) (born 1989), French singer-songwriter
- Slimane Hadj Abderrahmane (1973–2013), Danish Guantanamo detainee
- Slimane Azem (1918–1983), Algerian singer and poet
- Slimane Bengui, Algerian writer and businessman
- Slimane Chenine, Algerian politician
- Slimane Chikh (born 1940), Algerian politician
- Slimane Dazi, French actor
- Slimane Hoffman (1922–1992), Algerian politician
- Slimane Illoul (born 1983), Algerian footballer
- Slimane Khalfaoui (born 1975), French-Algerian terrorist
- Slimane Ould Mata (born 1975), Algerian footballer
- Slimane Moula (born 1999), Algerian middle-distance runner
- Slimane Raho (born 1975), Algerian footballer
- Slimane Saoudi (born 1975), Algerian tennis player
- Slimane Sissoko (born 1991), French footballer
- Slimane Zeghidour (born 1953), Algerian-French writer and journalist
- Slimane Zengli (born 1965), Algerian boxer

== Surname ==
=== Sliman ===
- Allan Sliman (1906–1945), Scottish footballer
- Ramzi Ben Sliman (born 1982), French film director and screenwriter

=== Slimane ===
- Hedi Slimane (born 1968), French-Tunisian photographer and fashion designer
- Radhouane Slimane (born 1980), Tunisian basketball player
- Yacine Ait-Slimane (born 1995), Canadian soccer player

== See also ==
- Suleiman
- Solomon (disambiguation)
- Sleiman
- Soliman (disambiguation)
- Sulaiman (disambiguation)
- Sulejman
- Sulayman
- Suleyman
- Süleymanoğlu
