= Soleymaniyeh =

Soleymaniyeh (Persian: سلیمانیه) may refer to:

- Soleymaniyeh, Kerman
- Soleymaniyeh, Rafsanjan, Kerman Province
- Soleymaniyeh, Kermanshah
- Soleymaniyeh, Sonqor, Kermanshah Province
- Soleymaniyeh, Razavi Khorasan
- Soleymaniyeh-ye Pa'in, Razavi Khorasan Province
- Soleymaniyeh, Nishapur, Razavi Khorasan Province
- Soleymaniyeh Palace, in Tehran

== See also ==
- Sulaymaniyah (disambiguation)
- Süleymaniye (disambiguation)
