= Salomon =

Salomon may refer to:

- Salomon (given name)
- Salomon (surname)
- Salomon Islands, an atoll of the British Indian Ocean Territory
- Salomon Brothers, a former investment bank, now part of Citigroup
- Salomon Group, a sporting equipment company
- Haym Salomon Nursing Home, a facility in Brooklyn, New York

== See also ==
- Salomons
- Suleiman, a name, including a list of variants
- Salomo (disambiguation)
- Solomon (disambiguation)
