= Soleyman =

Soleyman (Persian: سليمان) may refer to:

- Soleyman II, Persian ruler
- Soleyman Binafard (b. 1933), Iranian sport wrestler
- Soleyman, Khuzestan, a village in Khuzestan Province, Iran
- Soleyman, South Khorasan, a village in South Khorasan Province, Iran
- Soleyman District, an administrative subdivision of Razavi Khorasan Province, Iran
- Soleyman Rural District, an administrative subdivision of Razavi Khorasan Province, Iran

== See also ==
- Soleymani (disambiguation)
- Suleiman, a name, including a list of variants
- Solomon (disambiguation)
