= Süleymaniye (disambiguation) =

Süleymaniye Mosque is a 16th-century Ottoman mosque in Istanbul.

Süleymaniye may also refer to:

== Buildings ==
- Suleymaniye Mosque (London), a mosque in London
- Suleymaniye Mosque (Rhodes), a mosque in Rhodes
- Süleymaniye Hamam, a hamam (public bath) in Istanbul

== Places ==
- Süleymaniye, Akseki, a village in Akseki district of Antalya Province, Turkey
- Süleymaniye, Gümüşhane, a neighborhood of the city of Gümüşhane, Turkey
- Süleymaniye, Gelibolu

== Other ==
- Süleymaniye FC, former name of the Turkish sports club Küçükçekmece SK

== See also ==
- Soleymaniyeh (disambiguation)
- Sulaymaniyah (disambiguation)
