= Mohamed Soliman (disambiguation) =

Mohamed Soliman may refer to:

- Mohamed Abid Soliman (born 1945), Egyptian Olympic water polo player
- Mohamed Sabry Soliman, suspect in the 2025 Boulder fire attack
- Mohamed Sayed Soliman (born 1958), Egyptian Olympic basketball player
- Mohamed Yousef Soliman, professor and the former chairperson of the department of Petroleum Engineering at Texas Tech University

== See also ==
- Mohamedi Soliman, Egyptian basketball player in the 1948 Summer Olympics
- Muhammad Hussein Tantawi Soliman (1935-2021), Egyptian field marshal and politician
- Soliman (surname)
