= Sulyman =

Sulyman is an African masculine given name and surname, a variant of Suleiman, which is the Arabic form of Solomon. Notable people with the name include:

== Given name ==
- Sulyman Age Abdulkareem (fl. 21st century), Nigerian chemical engineer and professor
- Sulyman Kawu (fl. 21st century), Nigerian judge
- Muhammad Sulyman Al Fakki Al Shazly (fl. 1983–present), Sudanese-British writer and journalist

== Surname ==
- Seni Sulyman (born 1985), Nigerian entrepreneur
