= The Unknown Soldier (statue) =

Statue in Tirana, Albania

- Ushtari i panjohur
- Albania
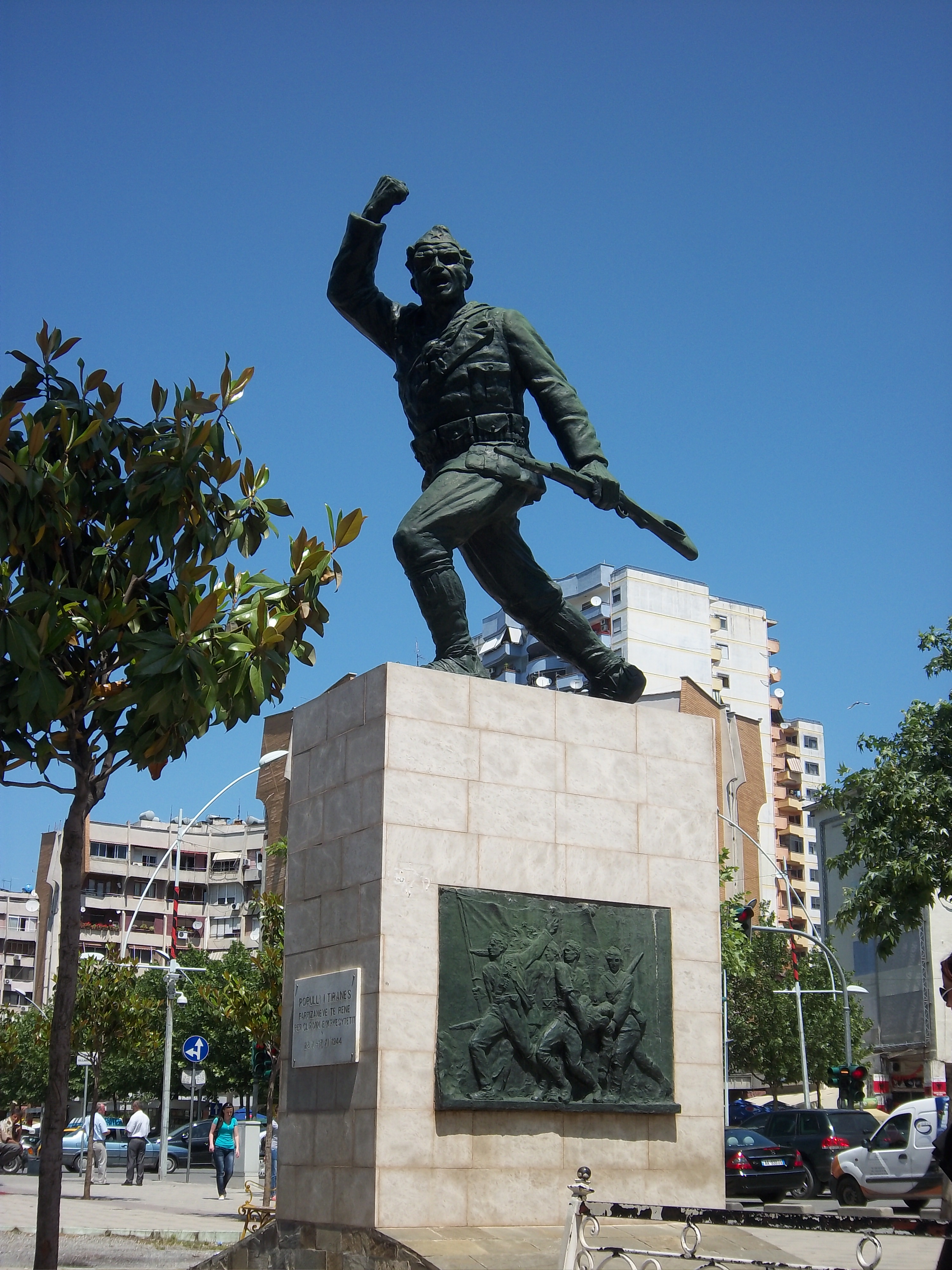
- The statue of the Unknown Soldier in the center of Tirana
- For soldiers who died during World War II
- Location: Tirana

The Unknown Soldier (Albanian: Ushtari i panjohur) is a war memorial statue in Tirana for the soldiers that died in the struggle against the Italian invaders during Second World War. The statue is located near the Albanian parliament and the Tomb of Kapllan Pasha. It was placed by the Albanian communists: For its construction, the 350-year old Sulejman Pasha Mosque built by the founder of the capital Sulejman Bargjini as well as the Suleyman Pasha Tomb were destroyed. The sculpture features a soldier with a raised fist and rifle, struggling forward.
