= Sulejman =

Sulejman is the Bosnian and Albanian form of the given name and surname Suleiman (Arabic سليمان). It means "man of peace". It may refer to:

- Sulejman Bargjini (also known as Sulejman Pasha), general of the Ottoman Empire
- Sulejman Delvina (1884–1933), Albanian politician and prime minister
- Sulejman Halilović (born 1955), Bosnian football (soccer) player
- Sulejman Kupusović (1951–2014) was a Bosnian film director
- Sulejman Maliqati (1928–2022), Albanian football (soccer) player
- Sulejman Medenčević (born 1963), Yugoslavia-born American cinematographer and producer
- Sulejman Mema (born 1955), Albanian football (soccer) player and manager
- Sulejman Naibi (Ramazani) (died 1772), Albanian poet
- Sulejman Pačariz (1900–1945), Islamic cleric and commander of the detachment of Muslim militia from Hisardžik (Prijepolje, modern-day Serbia)
- Sulejman Pitarka (1924–2007), Albanian actor, writer and playwright
- Sulejman Rebac (1929–2006), Bosnian football (soccer) player and manager
- Sulejman Smajić (born 1984), Bosnian football (soccer) player
- Sulejman Spaho (1949–2025), Serbian politician
- Sulejman Starova (footballer) (born 1955), Albanian football (soccer) player
- Sulejman Tihić (1951–2014), Bosniak politician
- Sulejman Ugljanin (born 1953), Serbian Bosniak politician
- Sulejman Vokshi (1815–1890), Albanian military commander and leader of the League of Prizren
- Sulejman Zalla (1892–1966), Albanian teacher, patriot and activist of the Rilindja Kombëtare of the early 20th century
- Sulejman Krpić (born 1991), Bosnian football (soccer) player

== See also ==
- Suleiman
- Sulejman Pasha Tomb
- Sulejman Pasha Mosque, Tirana, Albania
