= Slimani =

Slimani is an Arabic family name based on the given name Suleiman (Solomon). Slimani is a transliteration of localized slang pronunciation, whereas in classic Arabic, it would be pronounced as Suleimani.

Notable people with the surname include:

- Abdel Ali Slimani, Algerian singer
- Abdel Hamid Slimani (born 1956), Moroccan judoka
- Abdel Madjid Slimani (born 1959), Algerian handball player
- Aghiles Slimani (born 1982), Algerian swimmer
- Boubker Slimani (born 1952), Moroccan judoka
- Chico Slimani (born 1971), Welsh singer of Moroccan descent
- Eddy Nait Slimani (born 1993), French kickboxer
- Islam Slimani (born 1988), Algerian footballer
- Kacem Slimani (1948–1996), Moroccan footballer
- Kaddour Slimani (born 1984), Moroccan-born Italian long-distance runner
- Laura Slimani (born 1989), French politician
- Leïla Slimani (born 1981), French-Moroccan journalist and author
- Othman Slimani (1941–2004), Moroccan economist and banker
- Rabah Slimani (born 1989), French rugby union player
- Sid-Ahmed Slimani (born 1958), Algerian football manager
