= Suleyman =

Suleyman may refer to:

- Suleyman (name)
  - Suleiman, a name, including a list of variants
  - Suleiman the Magnificent (1494–1566), sultan of the Ottoman Empire
- Suleyman, Azerbaijan, a place
