= Suleiman Pasha =

Suleiman Pasha (Turkish: Süleyman Paşa, also transliterated as "Sulayman Pasha", "Süleyman Pasha", "Suleyman Pasha", "Sulejman Pasha") may refer to one of the following persons:

- Süleyman Pasha (son of Orhan) (c. 1306–1357), Ottoman prince, son of Orhan
- Hadım Suleiman Pasha (governor of Rumelia) (fl. 1474–1490), Ottoman governor of Rumelia and Anatolia
- Hadım Suleiman Pasha (died 1547), Ottoman grand vizier and governor of Egypt
- Süleyman Pasha (Venetian), (fl. 1599–1603), Ottoman governor of Algeria (1599–1603)
- Sulejman Bargjini (fl. 1614), Ottoman general, founder of Tirana
- Suleiman, sanjak-bey of Scutari (fl. 1685)
- İzmirli Süleyman Pasha (died 1721), Ottoman kapudan pasha
- Sarı Süleyman Pasha (died 1687), Ottoman grand vizier
- Ermeni Suleyman Pasha (died 1687), Ottoman grand vizier
- Sulayman Pasha the Great (died 1761), Mamluk ruler of Iraq
- Sulejman-paša Skopljak (fl. 1804–17), Ottoman military commander and governor of Belgrade
- Sulayman Pasha al-Adil (c. 1750-1819), vali of Sidon and governor of Acre
- Soliman Pasha al-Faransawi (1788–1860), also known as Colonel Sève, French-born Egyptian commander
- Suleiman Pasha (Ottoman general) (c. 1840–1892), Ottoman commander
- Süleyman Şefik Pasha (fl. 1919–1920), Ottoman military officer
- Süleyman Sabri Pasha (1873–1941), officer of the Ottoman Army and the general of the Turkish Army

== See also ==
- Süleymanpaşa, the designated central district of Tekirdağ Province of Turkey after 2014
- Rulers of Damascus, some of whom were named "Sulayman Pasha" and "Süleyman Pasha"
- Suleiman
