= Salomon (surname) =

Salomon is a surname. It originated as a derivative of the Hebrew biblical name Shlomo (also transliterated as Šlomo), for which the conventional latinization has been Solomon or Salomon.

Derivatives may include Salmon, Salman, Salamon and Salomons.

== Notable people with the surname ==
- Albert Salomon (surgeon) (1883–1976), German surgeon
- Albert Salomon (1891–1966), German sociologist
- Alexander Salomon (born 1986), German politician
- Alice Salomon (1872–1948), German social reformer
- Anne Salomon (born 1974), Canadian marine ecologist
- Ben L. Salomon (1914–1944), Medal of Honor recipient, U.S. Army (Battle of Saipan)
- Charles Eberhard Salomon (1824–1881), colonel in the Union Army during the American Civil War
- Charlotte Salomon (1917–1943), German-Jewish artist
- Daniel Salomon (musician) (born 1973), Israeli pop rock singer and musician
- Daniel Salomon (politician) (born 1957), Republican member of the Montana Legislature
- Dieter Salomon (born 1960), mayor of Freiburg, Germany
- Edward Salomon (1828–1909), governor of Wisconsin
- Edward S. Salomon (1836–1913), American Civil War general and governor of the Washington Territory
- Emil Salomonsson (born 1989), Swedish international footballer
- Erich Salomon (1886–1944), German photographer
- Ernst von Salomon (1902–1972), ex-Freikorps member, German writer and one of the assassins of Walther Rathenau
- François Salomon, founder of Salomon Group
- Franz Pfeffer von Salomon (1888–1968), ex-Freikorps member, leader of the SA (1926–1930)
- Frederick Salomon (1826–1897), American Civil War general
- Gavriel Salomon (1938–2016), Israeli educational psychologist
- Gotthold Salomon (1784–1862), German rabbi
- Haym Salomon (1740–1785), Jewish businessman and political financial broker, involved in the American Revolutionary War
- Hector Salomon (1838–1906), French composer
- Hermann Salomon (1938–2020), German Olympic javelin thrower
- Jakob Salomon Bartholdy (1779–1825), Prussian diplomat and uncle of Felix Mendelssohn
- Johann Peter Salomon (1745–1815), German composer and impresario
- Joseph François Salomon (1649–1732), French composer
- Junior Salomon (born 1986), Beninese football player
- Leon E. Salomon (1936–2023), US general
- Lysius Salomon (1815–1888), President of Haiti 1879–1888
- Mandy Salomon, Australian comedian
- Mark Salomon (born 1970), American singer
- Matisyohu Salomon (1937–2024), English-born American rabbi
- Michael Salomon, American music video and film director
- Mikael Salomon (born 1945), Danish filmmaker
- Otto Salomon (1849–1907), Swedish educator
- Richard G. Salomon (1884–1966), historian of Eastern European medieval history
- Richard G. Salomon (professor of Asian studies), professor of Asian studies
- Richard E. Salomon, vice chairman of the board of directors of the Council on Foreign Relations
- Rick Salomon (born 1968), American socialite, film producer and online gambling website owner
- Siegfried Salomon (1885–1962), Danish composer
- Yoel Moshe Salomon (1838–1912), Ottoman newspaper publisher and co-founder of towns

== See also ==
- Salomons
- Suleiman, a name, including a list of variants
- Solomon (name)
- Salmon (surname)
