= Soleymani =

Soleymani, Soleimani, Sulaymani, Suleimani, or Sulaimani may refer to:

== People ==
- Abbas-Ali Soleimani (1947–2023), Iranian ayatollah
- Alireza Soleimani (1956–2014), Iranian heavyweight wrestler
- Alireza Soleimani (weightlifter) (born 1996), Iranian weightlifter
- Amir Soleymani, Iranian art collector
- Davoud Soleymani, Iranian politician
- Gholam-Ali Soleimani (born 1946), Iranian businessman
- Gholamreza Soleimani (1964–2026), Iranian brigadier general
- Haj Qorban Soleimani (1920–2008), Iranian musician
- Iraj Soleimani (1946–2009), Iranian footballer
- Leyla Soleymani, Canadian scientist
- Masoud Soleimani (born 1970), Iranian hematologist
- Meysam Soleimani (born 1982), Iranian footballer
- Milad Sheykh Soleimani (born 1992), Iranian-Bangladeshi footballer
- Mohammad Soleimani (born 1954), Iranian politician
- Mohammad Soleimani (volleyball) (born 1987), Iranian volleyball player
- Mohammad Reza Soleimani (born 1995), Iranian footballer
- Parvin Soleimani (1922–2009), Iranian actress
- Qasem Soleimani (1957–2020), Iranian general
- Qasem Soleimani Dashtaki (born 1955), Iranian politician
- Sarah Solemani (born 1982), British actress and writer
- Sheida Soleimani (born 1990), American artist
- Zomorod Soleimani (born 1989), Iranian footballer

== Places ==
- Soleymani, Sirjan, a village in Kerman Province
- Sulaimani, Soleymani, Silêmanî, or Sulaymaniyah is a city in Iraqi Kurdistan
- Soleymani, Kazerun, a village in Fars Province
- Soleymani, Zarrin Dasht, a village in Fars Province
- Soleymani, Firuzeh, a village in Razavi Khorasan Province, Iran
- Soleymani, Mashhad, a village in Razavi Khorasan Province, Iran

== Other ==
- Slimani
- Sulaymani, a branch of Tayyibi Isma'ilism
- Süleymancılar, a Muslim Sunni-Hanafi jamia based in Turkey
- Sulejmani, Albanian surname

== See also ==
- Soleyman (disambiguation)
- Shahid Soleimani-class corvette
- Shahid Qasem Soleimani Stadium (disambiguation)
- Qasem Soleimani Expressway
- Funeral of Qasem Soleimani
