= Kawu =

Nigerian given name

- Gender: Male
- Language: Hausa

Origin
- Origin: Nigerian
- Meaning: Brother of one's mother
- Region of origin: North-East, Nigeria

Kawu is a Nigerian surname of Hausa origin which means "brother of one's mother". The word name "Kawu" is borrowed from Fula kaawu meaning a maternal uncle.

== Notable individuals with the name ==
- Kawu Peto Dukku (1958 – 2010), Nigerian politician.
- Sa'adatu Modibbo Kawu - Nigerian politician.
- Kawu Sumaila (OFR) (born 1968), Nigerian politician, businessman.
- Sulyman Kawu - Nigerian judge.

== Places ==
- Gombe
- Ilorin
