= Khaleedthefirst =

Nigerian-British singer (born 2001)

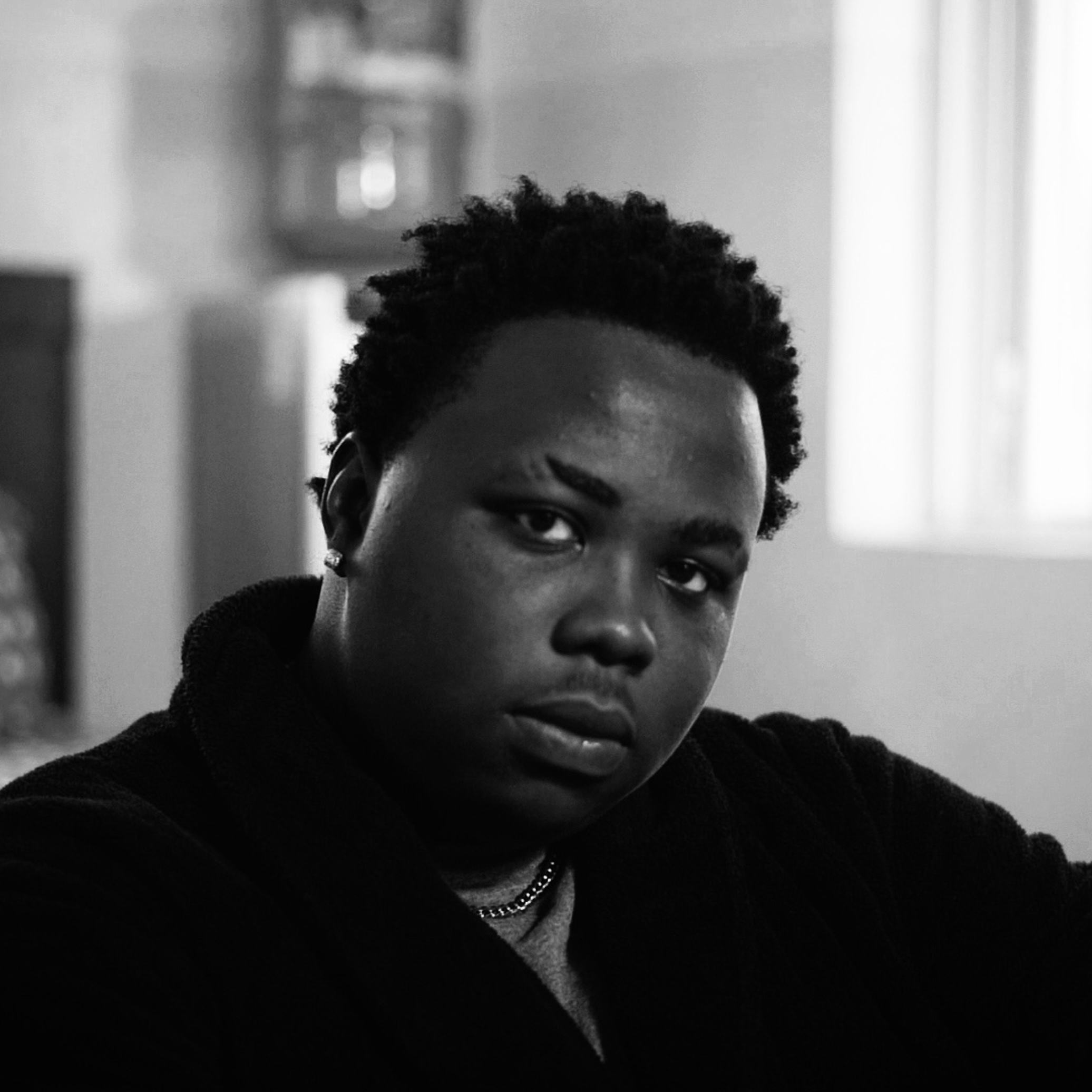
- Khaleedthefirst in 2024

Background information
- Born: Khalid Chibuikem Suleiman; 22 August 2001 (age 24); Tottenham, London, United Kingdom
- Origin: Benin City
- Genres: Alternative; Afrobeats; Afrobeat; Hip Hop
- Occupations: Singer; songwriter; rapper; record producer
- Instrument: Vocals
- Years active: 2022–present
- Label: Hoodaftrn Records / ONErpm (distributor)

Khaleedthefirst (born 22 August 2001) is the stage name of Khalid Suleiman Chibuikem, a Nigerian-British singer. In 2022, he garnered widespread recognition with the release of his single Top Boy Remix, featuring Nigerian rapper Odumodublvck. The collaboration received a total of 1 million views on TikTok and also peaked at number 42 on the Sierra Leone, Apple Music chart.

In August 2024, Khaleedthefirst released a single titled Shobani which Debuted at Number 21 on the top 50 Shazam Global chart.

== Early life and education ==
Khalid was born on 22 August 2001 in Tottenham, London, United Kingdom, and moved back to Nigeria with his parents at the age of six. He was raised in Benin City, Edo State, before later relocating to Abuja to further his education. He graduated from Baze University in 2024 with a degree in International Relations and Diplomacy. In 2025, he pursued further studies in Video and Audio Design at Madison Area Technical College in the United States, before returning to Nigeria in November of the same year.

== Career ==
=== 2025: "Character", "Șadé" and The Upcoming Project ===
On January 11, 2025, Khaleed took to his official X (formerly Twitter) to announce his forthcoming Project Sabogidda OrA, along with its lead single, "Character" scheduled to drop on 7 March 2025. The track dropped on March 14, 2025, under HoodAftrn Records and quickly drew widespread attention, especially after the music video premiered on MTV Base.

The music video for "Character" was co-directed by Khaleed, which marked a major milestone as his first to air on MTV Base. Within just three weeks, it crossed 50,000 views on YouTube, becoming his fastest-growing visual project to date.

On March 14 same day "Character" was released, Khaleed opened up to fans via his official X account (formerly Twitter) sharing that he is currently studying Video and Audio Design at Madison Area Technical College in the U.S. since January 2025. He credited the course for sharpening his editing and production skills, which he fully poured into the production of "Character"'s visuals.

On March 18 Just four days after the release, "Character" began charting on Shazam in the United States, representing a significant breakthrough in his career. In a conversation with Rita Okoye of Vanguard News, Khaleed spoke about the vision behind the lead single of his forthcoming project:

"I wanted 'Character' to be more than just a song—it's an experience. From the sound to the visuals to the storytelling, everything had to be in sync. That's why I was deeply involved in every step, from direction to post-production."

— Vanguard Newspaper

On April 20, 2025, "Character" peaked at No.16 on the Apple Music Alternative chart in Liberia. The single, released on March 14, 2025, marked another milestone in his career and highlighted his growing presence in the West African music scene.

On April 26, 2025, "Character" secured the No. 111 position on the Top 200 Benin Republic Apple Music Alternative Chart, garnering notable recognition in West Africa. Just one day later, on April 27, 2025, the track jumped to No. 44, reflecting its increasing popularity and the rising impact of The first on the region's Alternative music landscape.

On August 22, 2025 - His 24th birthday The First released a new single titled "Șadé", a name of Yoruba origin meaning "honor confers a crown" or "wealth bestows a crown". The title is a shortened form of the traditional Yoruba name FoláȘadé, often given to daughters and rich in cultural significance. Stylized with the Ș (S-comma), the title is pronounced (sha-DAY), using Romanian orthography to emphasize the "sh" sound phonetically.

In an interview with Purp Kulture, The First' provided an intimate look into the creative and emotional process behind his song "Șadé". He described the track as having a smooth and melodic surface, while revealing that it is deeply rooted in memory and personal emotion. The first shared that the song draws from his morning ritual of waking up and listening to his own music—a practice that helps him stay grounded and connected to his past. Through this ritual, he channels his experiences with love and loss, using the song as a medium to express vulnerability and invite listeners into his world. The lyrics of "Șadé" reflect on a past relationship, with "Șadé" functioning not just as a name but as a symbol of heartbreak. The First painted a vivid picture of his ex-partner and the lasting impact she had on him, explaining how music became his safe space to process the emotions left behind. A standout feature of the track, as discussed in the interview, is the sample from Omah Lay's "soso", specifically the phrase "soso take my pain." The First highlighted this choice as a meaningful connection to the broader narrative of heartbreak in Afrobeats, while also lending the song a relatable and universal feel. Through the interview, The first positioned "Șadé" as more than just a breakup song—it is a candid confrontation with personal scars and a translation of pain into melody. He emphasized the song's role as an honest and heartfelt expression, showing his willingness to let down his guard and share his truth with fans. On September 6, 2025, "Șadé" secured the No. 25 position on the Shazam Global Top 50 chart in Beijing, China, marking a significant milestone in its international reach and reflecting its growing resonance with listeners beyond Africa.

=== 2026: "Shobani Live" , "Ovie Edo" And "Crucifix" ===
On January 30, 2026, Khaleedthefirst released "Shobani" (Live), a reimagined version of his standout single, delivering a rich melodic experience alongside a bass guitarist, drummer, and keyboardist. The performance quickly gained traction, surpassing 100,000 views on YouTube within just three days of its release. The original track, Shobani, first dropped on August 30, 2024, and has since accumulated over 500,000 streams across all platforms, laying the foundation for the live rendition's success.

On April 24, 2026, Khaleedthefirst released “Ovie Edo,” a culturally reflective Afro-Beat single that became a defining moment in his career. The song served as both a tribute to his heritage and a personal account of his upbringing in Benin City, while also referencing his transition into life in Isale Eko, Lagos. Through detailed storytelling and vivid imagery, the record highlighted the environments, memories, and figures that influenced his worldview.

On June 26, 2026, Khaleedthefirst released "Crucifix", his second single of 2026 following "Ovie Edo". Distributed through ONErpm and Anchorwave Group, the release was featured in the UK music publication Dork.

== Partnerships and Endorsements ==
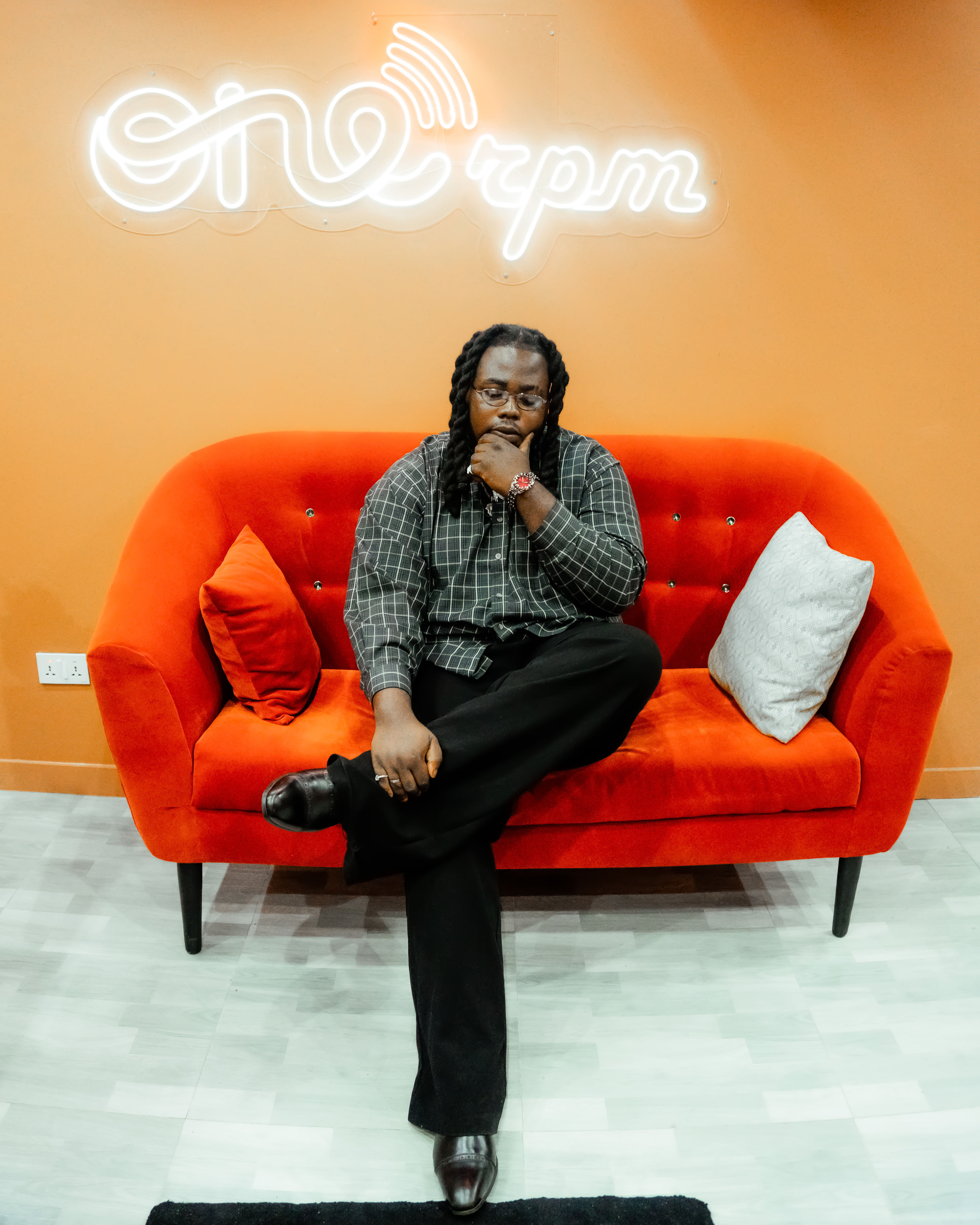
Khaleedthefirst at ONErpm Africa Lagos Office 2026

On March 21, 2026, Khaleedthefirst reached a major professional milestone by securing a formal partnership with ONErpm Africa. The collaboration was finalized during a visit to the distributor's regional headquarters, where he met with key industry executives. To mark the moment, a documentary-style visual was released via his YouTube channel, tracing his journey from independent beginnings to joining a global distribution network. The project highlights both his artistic development and the strategic direction behind his recent work. The announcement sparked conversation across social media. Blogger Bamidele wrote on X (formerly Twitter): “@khaleedthefirst is the latest addition to the ONErpm family. Being in the same catalogue as Bella Shmurda, peruzzi, and Zlatan says a lot about his trajectory. Keep your eyes on this one.” The reaction reflects a growing awareness of his presence within the industry.

== Controversy ==
=== 2024 Chobani Trademark issue ===
Chobani By Khaleedthefirst

On August 30, 2024, Khaleedthefirst released his single "Chobani Now Shobani". The release garnered attention not only for the music but also for its striking album artwork, which prominently featured Chobani's yogurt branding. The artwork featured the Chobani logo, and the title was a direct play on the company's trademarked name. This raised immediate concerns about potential trademark infringement, as it appeared that Khaleed had used the brand's logo and name in a way that could cause confusion in the marketplace, a potential violation of intellectual property laws.

=== Khaleedthefirst's initial reaction ===
To my beloved fans,

UPDATE ON MY RECENT SINGLE "CHOBANI" (NOW "SHOBANI") I wanted to give you all a quick update on some changes regarding the artwork, videos, and title of my recently released song, Chobani. After some great conversations with the team at Chobani®, my team and I have decided to make a few adjustments to avoid any potential copyright issues. The song's title has now been changed to Shobani. Don't worry the vibe and sound remain the same, and the track is still available everywhere! This song was created out of a fun, spontaneous moment, and I'm incredibly grateful for all your love and support. The new artwork will be available on all DSPs in about two weeks! Thank you, and stay tuned for more updates.

Much love Khaleedthefirst.

— X (former twitter)

At precisely 1:36 PM, On September 9, 2024, Khaleed responded to the controversy via his official Twitter (now X) account with a post that seemed to address the ongoing legal questions. His tweet was implying that there was a deeper, ongoing issue.

=== 2024 From Chobani to Shobani ===
Shobani by Khaleedthefirst

A few days after the release, the title of the song and the artwork were changed. The song was rebranded to "Shobani," and the artwork was updated to reflect the new branding, now free of any direct reference to Chobani yogurt. This quick alteration led many to believe that Chobani had reached out to Khaleed in resolving the issue before it escalated further.

=== Chobani's involvement ===
Chobani yogurt team gifted khaleedthefirst

On September 27, 2024, Khaleed posted an appreciation message on his social media platforms, which seemed to suggest that he and Chobani had come to an understanding. The post read:

"Thank you so much Chobani. I and my team sincerely appreciate this."

The post features Khaleedthefirst unboxing Chobani's latest yogurt products, which were recently sent to him.

== Activism ==
=== Political criticism ===
On the night of 28 November 2024, Khaleedthefirst took to his X (formerly Twitter) account to publicly express his frustrations over Nigeria's escalating economic crisis. In his post, he criticized the government's failure to address the country's worsening economic challenges, which have resulted in widespread hardship for ordinary Nigerians. Khaleedthefirst's comments highlighted issues such as inflation, unemployment, and poverty, and he condemned the Nigerian government for its inability to implement effective solutions to alleviate the suffering of its citizens.

== Discography ==
=== Extended plays ===
- Summer Never Ended (2026)

=== Mixtapes ===
- TWENTY II (2023)

=== Singles ===
Year	Title	Ref
2022	"Top Boy Remix" (featuring Odumodublvck)	
2023	"Faded (Puff & Pass)"	
2023	"Babcock" (featuring Cali-ber Tha Grime)	
2023	"Holy Water"	
2023	"Holy Water Remix" (featuring Bony CDM)	
2024	"I Need That"	
2024	"Obafemi Awolowo"	
2024	"Gbana"	
2024	"Shobani"	
2025	"Character"	
2025	"Dangote" (with Tobii WTW)	
2025	"Paris"	
2025	"ṢADÉ"	
2026	"Shobani Live"	
2026	"Ovie Edo"	
2026	"Crucifix"	

=== Charts ===
List of singles, showing title and year released with selected chart positions
Song Titles	Year Released	Chart	Peak position	Ref
Top Boy Remix (featuring Odumodublvck)	2022	Sierra Leone, (Apple Music Alternative)	42	
Shobani	2024	Buffalo, United States, (Top 50 Global Shazam)	21	
Character	2025	Liberia, (Apple Music Alternative)	16	
Character	2025	Benin Republic, (Apple Music Alternative)	44	
Șadé	2026	Beijing, China (Top 50 Global Shazam)	25	
