= Kapllan Pasha Tomb =

Historic site in Tirana, Albania

Coordinates: 41°19′40″N 19°49′18″E

Tomb of Kapllan Pasha Tyrbja e Kapllan Pashës
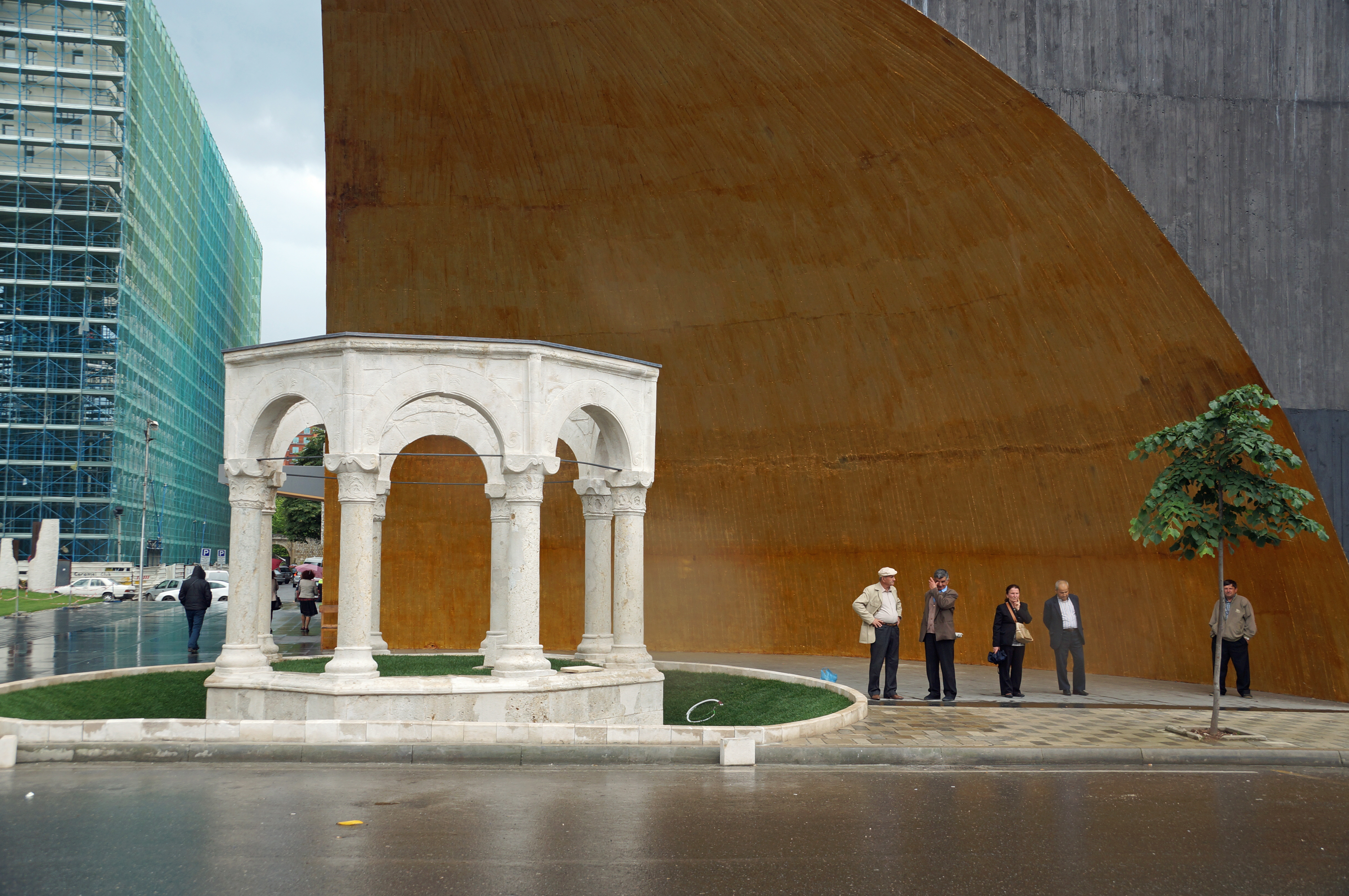
- Interactive map of Tomb of Kapllan Pasha; Tyrbja e Kapllan Pashës
- Location: Rruga 28 Nëntori; Tirana, Albania

History
- Built: 1817

Site notes
- Architect: Sulejman Bargjini

Cultural Monument of Albania
- Designated: 1948

The Kapllan Pasha Tomb (Albanian: Tyrbja e Kapllan Pashës) is a Muslim Türbe built in 1817 in the center of Tirana, Albania. The government of Albania declared it a Cultural Monument of the first category in 1948. Its 8 columns are made of carved stone, placed on an octagonal-shaped stone base, and capped with octagonal shape capitals. The former Ottoman ruler of Tirana was interred here in the 19th century, but his remains were later repatriated to Istanbul, Turkey.

It stood next to the Sylejman Pasha Mosque, which was destroyed during World War II and is not to be confused with the Suleyman Pasha Tomb. It was restored by the Municipality of Tirana in 1985.

== See also ==
- Tirana
- TID Tower
- Landmarks in Tirana
- Tourism in Albania
