= Solomonic =

Solomonic means "relating to Solomon". It may refer to:

- Solomonic wisdom in Abrahamic religions
- Solomonic magic in occultism
- Solomonic column in architecture
- Solomonic dynasty of the Ethiopian Empire
- Relating to the Solomon Islands
  - Northwest Solomonic languages
  - Southeast Solomonic languages

== See also ==
- Solomon (disambiguation)
