= Sulaymaniyah (disambiguation) =

Sulaymaniyah or Sulaymaniyya (Arabic: السليمانية) is a city in Iraq.

Sulaymaniyah may also refer to:

- Sulaymaniyah District
- Sulaymaniyah (football club)
- Sulaymaniyah Governorate
- Sulaymaniyah incident
- Sulaymaniyah International Airport
- Sulaymaniyah Mosque
- Sulaymaniyah Museum
- Sulaymaniyah Stadium
- Sulaymaniyya Takiyya

== See also ==
- Soleymaniyeh (disambiguation)
- Süleymaniye (disambiguation)
