= Solomons (surname) =

Solomons is a surname. Notable people with the surname include:

- Adolphus Solomons (1826–1910), American philanthropist
- Sir Adrian Solomons (1922–1991), Australian politician
- Anzel Solomons (born 1978), South African chess master
- Bethel Solomons (1885–1965), Irish medical doctor and an international rugby player for Ireland
- Bill Solomons (1933–2016), Australian sailor
- Burt Solomons (born 1950), American attorney
- David Solomons, several people
- Dillan Solomons (born 1996), South African soccer player
- Gus Solomons Jr. (1938–2023), American dancer, choreographer, journalist, and educator
- Henry Solomons (1902–1965), British businessman, trade unionist, and politician
- Jason Solomons (born 1969), British film critic, journalist, broadcaster, and author
- Jonathan Solomons (born 1976), South African soccer player
- Levy Solomons (1730–1792), Jewish Canadian merchant and fur trader
- Richard Solomons (born 1961), British businessman
- Ralph Solomons, a pseudonym used by Kent Walton (1917–2003) as film producer
- Theodore Solomons (1870–1947), American explorer

== See also ==
- Alfie Solomons, fictionalal character in the British period crime drama television series Peaky Blinders
- Solomons (disambiguation)
