= Salomo =

Salomo may refer to:

== People ==
- Salomo of Makuria, ruler of the Nubian kingdom of Makuria (1080–1089)
- Salomo Glassius (May 20, 1593–July 27, 1656), German theologian and biblical critic
- Soma Morgenstern (May 3, 1890–April 17, 1976), Jewish-Austrian writer and journalist

== Places ==
- Salomó, a village in the Catalan district of Tarragonès, Spain

== See also ==
- Suleiman, a name, including a list of variants
