= Sulejmani =

Sulejmani is an Albanian and Gorani surname. Notable people with the surname include:

- Alban Sulejmani (born 1998), Macedonian footballer
- Erkan Sulejmani (born 1981), Albanian footballer
- Miralem Sulejmani (born 1988), Serbian footballer
- Skumbim Sulejmani (born 1986), Albanian-Swiss footballer
- Valmir Sulejmani (born 1996), German footballer

== See also ==
- Soleymani (disambiguation)
