= Soliman =

Soliman an alternative to may refer to:

- Soliman (surname), including a list of people with the name
- Soliman, Tunisia, a place

== See also ==
- Suleiman, a name, including a list of variants
- Solomon (disambiguation)
