= Solomons =

Solomons may refer to:

== Places ==
- Solomon Islands, a sovereign state
- Solomon Islands (archipelago), an archipelago that includes the sovereign state nation of Solomon Islands and the Papua New Guinea island of Bougainville
- British Solomon Islands, the Solomon Islands, apart from Bougainville, before 1978
- North Solomon Islands, the area of the Solomon Islands archipelago previously under German control and covering Bougainville and what are now the northwestern provinces of Solomon Islands
- Solomons, Maryland, USA
- Solomons Island: see Solomons, Maryland
- Mount Solomons, a peak in the Sierra Nevada mountain range in the U.S. state of California

== Military ==
- Solomon Islands campaign, a World War II campaign
- Naval Amphibious Training Base Solomons

== Other uses ==
- Solomons (surname)
- USS Solomons, the thirteenth of fifty Casablanca-class escort carriers built for the United States Navy during World War II

== See also ==
- Solomon (disambiguation)
