= Posht-e Par-e Soleyman =

Posht-e Par-e Soleyman پشت پرسليمان
- Village
- Location within Iran
- Coordinates: 29°20′22″N 52°01′16″E
- Country: Iran
- Province: Fars
- County: Kazerun
- Bakhsh: Jereh and Baladeh
- Rural District: Jereh

Population (2006)
  - Total: 263
- Time zone: UTC+3:30 (IRST)
  - Summer (DST): UTC+4:30 (IRDT)

Posht-e Par-e Soleyman (Persian: پشت پرسليمان, also Romanized as Posht-e Par-e Soleymān; also known as Soleymānī) is a village in Jereh Rural District, Jereh and Baladeh District, Kazerun County, Fars province, Iran. At the 2006 census, its population was 263, in 58 families.
