= Sliman Bensmaia =

French-Algerian neuroscientist (1973–2023)

- Born: 17 September 1973; Nice, France
- Died: 11 August 2023 (aged 49); Chicago, Illinois, U.S.
- Education: University of Virginia (BS); University of North Carolina at Chapel Hill (PhD)
- Spouse: Kerry Ledoux
- Scientific career
- Fields: Neuroscience
- Workplaces: University of Chicago; Johns Hopkins University
- Doctoral advisor: Mark Hollins
- Other academic advisors: Kenneth Johnson
- Website: Bensmaia lab website

Sliman Julien Bensmaia (17 September 1973 – 11 August 2023) was a French-Algerian neuroscientist. An international expert in the neural encoding of sensory information and a pioneer in robotic neuroprosthetics, his nearly 100 academic articles in somatosensation have been cited over 10,000 times. He is the principal architect of the biomimetic approach to naturalistic restoration of the sensations of touch and proprioception in amputees and paralyzed patients.

== Education and career ==
Bensmaia was born on September 17, 1973, in Nice, France, to philosophers Reda Bensmaia and Joëlle Proust. He grew up in Algeria and France. When he was 15, he moved to the United States.

Bensmaia obtained a bachelor's degree in computer engineering and cognitive science from the University of Virginia's Department of Cognitive Science in 1995. He went on to earn a doctorate from the University of North Carolina at Chapel Hill's Department of Psychology (1996–2003) under the mentorship of Mark Hollins. In 2002, he received the Baughman Dissertation Research Award, which celebrates innovation in dissertation project development. Before founding his own laboratory, Bensmaia worked as a postdoctoral fellow (2003–2006) and then as an associate research scientist (2006–2009) in the lab of Kenneth Johnson at Johns Hopkins University's Zanvyl Krieger Mind/Brain Institute in the Department of Neuroscience.

In 2009, Bensmaia accepted an assistant professorship within the University of Chicago's Department of Organismal Biology and Anatomy. He was promoted to Associate Professor in 2015 and to full Professor in 2019. Bensmaia was part of the University of Chicago's graduate programs in Integrative Biology, Biosciences, Computational Neuroscience, and Neurobiology, as well as a member of the Committees on Neurobiology and Computational Neuroscience. He was named the James and Karen Frank Family Professor of Organismal Biology and Anatomy at the University in 2019.

== Research ==
=== Neural encoding of surface texture and tactile motion ===
Bensmaia held particular expertise in textural sensory touch in the nervous system, having discovered distinctions between nerve fibers responding to the spatial elements of course textures (e.g., as needed to read Braille) and those responding to the vibrations induced through tactile contact with fine textures like fabrics. He led projects that identified how many types of information were processed in the nervous system to represent the texture of surfaces. By tracing information about contact location, force, and temporal patterning from peripheral nerves through a variety of types and locations of neurons and up to somatosensory cortex, his laboratory built a complex model of how we process and understand tactile sensations. This model allowed Bensmaia to spearhead research into imbuing robotic prosthetics with a natural sense of touch.

=== Brain/computer interfaces and somatosensation in prosthetic limbs ===
Bensmaia's lab demonstrated that, through electrical stimulation of somatosensory neurons in the peripheral nervous system, precise models of mechanotransduction through the nervous system can produce a realistic perception of touch. This biomimetic approach to touch restoration in amputees and paralyzed patients enhances dexterity in neuroprosthetics. Mimicking the patterns of neural activity induced when able-bodied individuals interact with objects via direct neural interface enables intuitive sensation, refines grip strength control, and facilitates object identification while blindfolded.

In 2008, Bensmaia joined the United States Department of Defense's $100-million DARPA-funded Revolutionizing Prosthetics research program, coordinated by the Johns Hopkins Applied Physics Laboratory. Specifically, he worked on the sensory aspect of the Modular Prosthetic Limb in a study called Behavioral Assessment of Sensitivity to Intracortical Microstimulation of Primate Somatosensory Cortex.

The University of Pittsburgh and the University of Chicago entered into a collaboration that, in 2016, allowed a clinical trial participant to control and receive tactile sensation through a robotic hand via direct neural interface. In 2019, Bensmaia's lab, together with the lab of Nicholas Hatsopoulos, received a $3.4-million National Institutes of Health (NIH) grant—part of a combined $7 million awarded to the University of Pittsburgh and University of Chicago collaborators—for continued development of the project and research.

== Recognition ==
In 2017, during his Presidential farewell address, President Barack Obama praised Bensmaia's work in the development of Nathan Copeland's neurally controlled and touch-sensitive robotic arm. A selection of his other professional commendations are summarized below.

Award	Year
Baughman Dissertation Research Award for innovative dissertation projects	2002
Early Career Award from the National Science Foundation	2011
Chicago Biomedical Consortium Catalyst Award	2013
Distinguished Investigator Award from the Biological Sciences Division	2015
Kavli Frontiers of Science Fellow by the National Academy of Sciences	2018
Research Program Award (R35) from the National Institute of Neurological Disorders and Stroke	2021

== Music ==
An accomplished pianist, Bensmaia had planned to work as a musician prior to pursuing his PhD. He co-founded FuzZz, a Chicago-based jazz and funk band, with neuroscientific colleague David Freedman in 2010, serving as a composer and keyboardist. In 2013, FuzZz released their first album, FuzZz.

== Personal life ==
Sliman Bensmaia was married to University of Chicago Professor Kerry Ledoux. Together they had two children. He died on August 11, 2023, at his home in Chicago.
