= Salomons =

Salomons is a surname. Notable people with this surname include:

- Annie Salomons (1885–1980), Dutch writer, poet and translator
- Carolien Salomons (born 1974), Dutch cricketer
- David Salomons (1797–1873), British banker, politician and Lord Mayor of London
- David Lionel Goldsmid-Stern-Salomons (1851–1925), British author and barrister
- Edward Salomons (1828–1906), English architect
- Julian Salomons (1835–1909) British-born barrister and politician in Australia
- Leopold Salomons (1841–1915), British financier and director
- Philip Salomons (1796–1867), English financier, brother of David
- Piet Salomons (1924–1948), Dutch water polo player

== Other ==
- Goldsmid-Stern-Salomons baronets
- Salomons Museum, former country house of Sir David Salomons in Kent

== See also ==
- Salomon
