= Sliman Ourak =

Tunisian politician

Sliman Ourak is a Tunisian politician. He was the Minister of Trade and Handicrafts under former President born July 28, 1955, in Tunis. After earning a Masters in Law (Private Law), Mr. Slimane Ourak studied postgraduate at the Institut Technique de Banque (ITB) in Paris. He did internships in several Tunisian banks and participated in national conferences and international training on the mechanisms of promotion and financing of Small and Medium Enterprises (SMEs). He has also conducted training sessions and international micro-finance mechanism to fight against poverty and marginalization. Mr. Ourak began his professional career in December 1981 to the National Housing Savings (Housing Bank (BH) today), before being appointed director general of Finance Ministry of Planning and Finance. He then served as Director General of the Tunisian Solidarity Bank (BTS) (April 1999 - November 2004) and Director General of Customs (November 2004), a position he held until his new appointment. Mr. Slimane is Ourak Officer of the Order of the Republic (2006) and Officer of the Order of 7 November (2007). He was also decorated with the Medal of Labour (2003). Mr. Ourak is married with three children.
