= Shahid Qasem Soleimani Stadium (disambiguation) =

Shahid Qasem Soleimani Stadium may refer to the following stadiums in Iran named after assassinated Iranian military officer Qasem Soleimani:

- Shahid Qasem Soleimani Stadium (Sirjan), a stadium in Sirjan.
- Shahid Qasem Soleimani Stadium (Tabriz), a stadium in Tabriz.
