= Omar Bin Sulaiman =

Dr. Omar Bin Sulaiman
- Born: 1973 (46 years); United Arab Emirates
- Occupations: Chairman, OBS Group.
- Website: http://www.obsgroup.com

Dr. Omar Bin Sulaiman is the chairman of the OBS Group, a privately held diversified group with operations across the Middle East and emerging markets.

== Career ==
Bin Sulaiman was the former governor of Dubai International Financial Centre (DIFC). He was the representative for DIFC for His Highness Sheikh Mohammed Bin Rashid Al Maktoum, Vice President and Prime Minister of the United Arab Emirates and Ruler of Dubai.

=== Dubai International Financial Centre Authority ===
He was previously Director General of Dubai International Financial Centre Authority (DIFCA), where he led the development of DIFC, which aims to be a universally recognized as a hub for institutional finance and a gateway for capital and investment in the region. He also led the development of Dubai International Financial Exchange, the first international financial exchange in the region.

=== Dubai Internet City ===
Prior to joining the DIFC, Dr. Sulaiman was CEO of Dubai Internet City (DIC). Under his leadership DIC achieved more than 100 per cent growth in less than a year and continued for three consecutive years. He led the development of DIC into a major ICT cluster that houses several global giants such as Microsoft, Oracle IBM, SAP, Cisco, Sony Ericsson, Sun Microsystems and Siemens. At the same time he also led the development of several other entities under the banner of the Dubai Technology and Media (TECOM) Free Zone Authority, the Government body responsible for the development of knowledge clusters like ICT, media, education, energy etc.

Over the years, Dr. Bin Sulaiman has held key positions as Chairman of DIFC Investments, member of the Economic and Trade Committee established by the Executive Council of Dubai, Managing Director of Dubai Aerospace Enterprise, Vice-Chairman of Dubai Real Estate Corporation. He was also the founder of Dubai Outsource Zone, the co-founder Emirates Central Cooling Systems Corporation and Dubai Knowledge Village.

Dr. Bin Sulaiman became the Vice Chairman of Al Ahli Club, a premier football club in Dubai. He was also the Vice Chairman of Dubai Autism Center. He was a board member of the Sheikh Mohammed Bin Rashid Establishment for Young Business Leaders, a member of Endowment Fund, Dubai, a member of Seoul International Business Advisory Council, a board member of Etisalat, a telecommunications company from the UAE, spread across 18 countries worldwide.

He holds a Doctorate in Leadership, a Master of Business Administration (MBA) in Finance, a Master of Science in Education and a Bachelor's degree in Industrial Engineering.

== Allegations of public funds misuse ==
In 2010, Bin Sulaiman was arrested and investigated by the Dubai Public Prosecution for alleged misuse of public funds. He was dismissed from his governor role of DIFC. The DIFC’s ex-governor was placed under provisional detention during the said investigation. In April, Gulf News reported he was briefly released after he repaid Dh51.5 million (US$14m). However, Dubai’s Attorney General, Essam Al Humaidan, refuted the claims and issued a statement that investigations on Bin Sulaiman's case are still ongoing, and will continue.
