= Solomon Lake =

Lake in the state of Minnesota, United States

- Location within Minnesota
- Location: Kandiyohi County, Minnesota
- Coordinates: 45°10′37″N 95°6′8″W
- Type: lake

Solomon Lake is a lake in Kandiyohi County, in the U.S. state of Minnesota.

Solomon Lake was named for Solomon R. Foot, a pioneer for whom Foot Lake was also named.

== See also ==
- List of lakes in Minnesota
