= Sulejman Zalla =

Albanian activist and educator

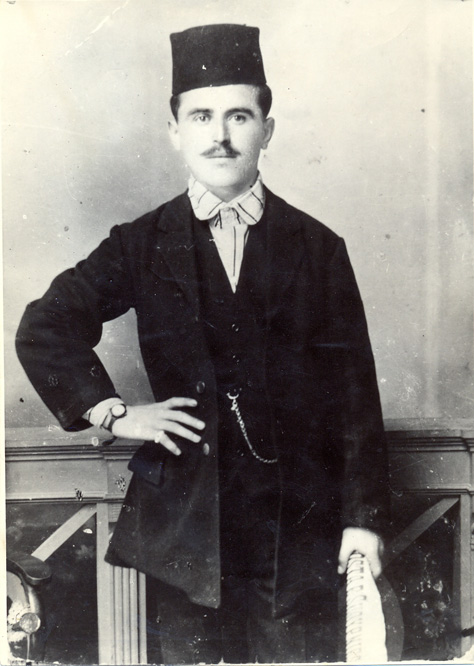
- Born: 1892; Krujë, Ottoman Empire
- Died: 1966 (aged 73–74)
- Occupations: Activist; Educator

Sulejman Zalla (1892–1966) was an Albanian teacher, patriot and activist of the Rilindja Kombëtare of the early 20th century. He was the founder of the first modern Albanian school in the County of Durrës.

== Biography ==
Originally from the city of Krujë, where he was born in 1892, Sulejman Zalla pursued elementary studies in his home city and later pursued a degree in the Shkolla Normale of Shkodër in order to become an Albanian teacher.

On 4 March 1913, in Ishëm, Zalla opened the first school in the County of Durrës (which at that time included the cities of Tirana, Krujë, Durrës and Kavajë). As recorded by contemporary sources, the opening of the school was met with opposition from the local authorities, which saw the teaching of Albanian in the Latin alphabet as a heresy, given the Muslim dominant culture of the area. As a result of this opposition, the student count was reduced within the first months from 40 pupils to only 10. In addition, the prefect decided to transfer away the local Muslim clergy, but the decision was reverted by governor Essad Toptani. In these conditions Muslim extremists organized the killing of Sulejman Zalla, who was the teacher of the school, and who was declared by them as a heretic. This intention was countered by the local population of Ishëm, who took the teacher under their protection. Zalla's love for the Albanian language earned him the name of "Sulë Shqipja" (Sulejman the Albanian language).

Esat Pasha had Zalla arrested in 1914 and kept him in prisons of Durrës and then Krujë. Rebels of the Peasant Revolt got him out of prison and Zalla had to become the secretary of Haxhi Qamili, leader of an egalitarian and anti-feudal Peasant Revolt in 1914–15. Later he managed to leave Qamili and to go to Prênk Bibë Doda, the bayraktar of Mirdita, where he obtained protection under the Albanian besa. At the end of the Peasant Revolt, Zalla returned in the municipalities of Krujë, Prezë, and Ishëm, to teach, and, eventually, in 1927, settled down in the town of Shijak, where he continued to teach Albanian.

When Albania was under Italy during World War II, Zalla put his house at the use of the resistance against fascist Italy. For this reason a decision was made that he be transferred to Tuzi of Montenegro, then part of Albania. The decision was never implemented.

During Communist Albania, Zalla and his brother were both arrested in 1947 for unknown reasons. He was released two years later with no right to teach. Some years later this right was granted back. At that point he went back to his teaching career and was recipient of several government medals for his educational endeavors, including the People's Teacher (Albanian: Mësues i Popullit) which was granted in 1994.

== Sources ==
- Sudar, Nikolla, historian and former director of the Historical Museum of Shijak (4 March 2013), Sulejman Zalla, mësuesi rebel që u përball me Esad Pashën (in Albanian), Revista Kuvendi
