= Sulliman =

Sulliman is a surname from Arabic and Hebrew origin. Notable people with the surname include:

- Doug Sulliman (born 1959), Canadian ice hockey player
- Hisham Sulliman (born 1978), Arab-Israeli actor
- Easah Suliman (born 1998), Professional English Footballer

== See also ==
- Sulliman Mazadou (born 1985), French born Nigerian footballer
- Suleiman, a name, including a list of variants
- Sullivan (disambiguation)
