= Soliman (surname) =

Soliman is a surname. Notable people with the surname include:

- Ahmed Soliman (basketball) (born 1965), former Egyptian basketball player
- Angelo Soliman (1721–1796), Austrian intellectual
- Azza Soliman (born 1968), Egyptian lawyer and women's rights activist
- Karam Soliman (born 1944), American-Egyptian pharmacologist
- Mohamed Sabry Soliman (born 1979), Egyptian suspect in the 2025 Boulder fire attack
- Mohamed Yousef Soliman (born 1948), Egyptian engineer and professor
- Sam Soliman (born 1973), Australian boxer
- Soliman Abdel-hady Soliman, Egyptian professor of electrical engineering
- Walid Soliman (writer) (born 1975), Tunisian writer, essayist and translator
- Walid Soliman (footballer) (born 1984), Egyptian football player
