= Suleyman, Azerbaijan =

Suleyman
- Location within Azerbaijan
- Coordinates: 40°21′46″N 49°11′53″E
- Country: Azerbaijan
- Rayon: Absheron
- Time zone: UTC+4 (AZT)
  - Summer (DST): UTC+5 (AZT)

Suleyman (also, Kochevka Suleyman) is a village in the Absheron Rayon of Azerbaijan.
