= Suleyman (name) =

Suleyman or Süleyman is a variant of Suleiman (the Arabic name سليمان). It means 'man of peace'. Notable people with the name include:

== Suleyman ==
- Suleyman I of Rûm or Suleiman ibn Qutulmish (d. 1086), founder of an independent Seljuq Turkish state in Anatolia
- Suleyman (mansa), mansa of Mali (1341–1360)
- Sulayman al-Arabi, wali of Barcelona
- Suleyman Shah (d. 1227 or 1228), grandfather of Osman I, founder of the Ottoman Empire
- Chimene Suleyman, 21st-century UK-born US-based writer
- Mustafa Suleyman, a British artificial intelligence (AI) entrepreneur. Currently the CEO of Microsoft AI, co-founder and former head of applied AI at DeepMind

== Süleyman ==
- Süleyman Aktaş, Turkish serial killer
- Süleyman Atlı (born 1994), Turkish freestyle sport wrestler
- Süleyman Başak, Turkish economist
- Süleyman Demirel (1924–2015), Turkish politician and 9th President of Turkey
- Süleyman Fehim, Ottoman teacher and poet
- Süleyman Genç (1944–2022), Turkish politician
- Süleyman Nazif, Turkish poet
- Süleyman Nuri (1895–1966), Ottoman Russian communist politician
- Süleyman Yalçın (1926–2016), Turkish physician and conservative thinker
- Süleyman Zorba (born 1995), Turkish-born Austrian politician
