= Sulejman Pasha Mosque =

Former Sunni mosque in Tirana City, Tirana County, Albania

- Xhamia e Sulejman Pashës
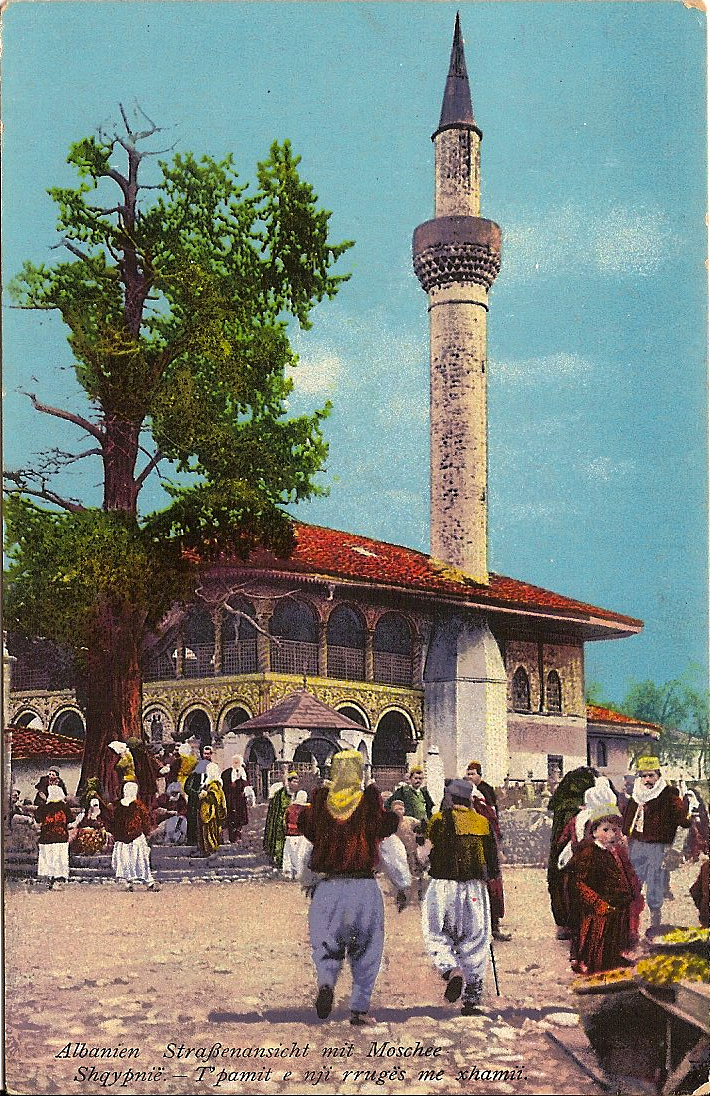
- The former mosque in 1914, 300 years after its construction

- Location of the former mosque in Albania

Religion
- Affiliation: Sunni Islam (former)
- Ecclesiastical or organisational status: Mosque (1614–1944)
- Status: Destroyed

Location
- Location: Tirana, Tirana County
- Country: Albania
- Interactive map of Sulejman Pasha Mosque
- Coordinates: 41°19′42″N 19°49′19″E

Architecture
- Type: Islamic architecture
- Founder: Sulejman Bargjini
- Completed: 1614 CE
- Destroyed: 1945 (under Communist rule)
- Minaret: 1

The Sulejman Pasha Mosque (Albanian: Xhamia e Sulejman Pashës), also known as the Old Mosque (Albanian: Xhamia e Vjetër), was the first mosque in the city of Tirana, in Tirana County, Albania. Completed in 1614, the mosque was partially destroyed in November 1944, during World War II, and razed the following year during the Communist rule of Enver Hoxha.

The former mosque, together with a hammam and a bakery, were founded by Pasha Sulejman Bargjini, with the mosque named in his honour. In the mid-20th century, the mosque and surrounding streets were razed to make space for the Communist-era Statue of the Unknown Soldier, completed in 1949.

While the St. Procopius and the Sacred Heart churches get restored, there are no plans for the reconstruction of Tirana's founding mosque.

== History ==
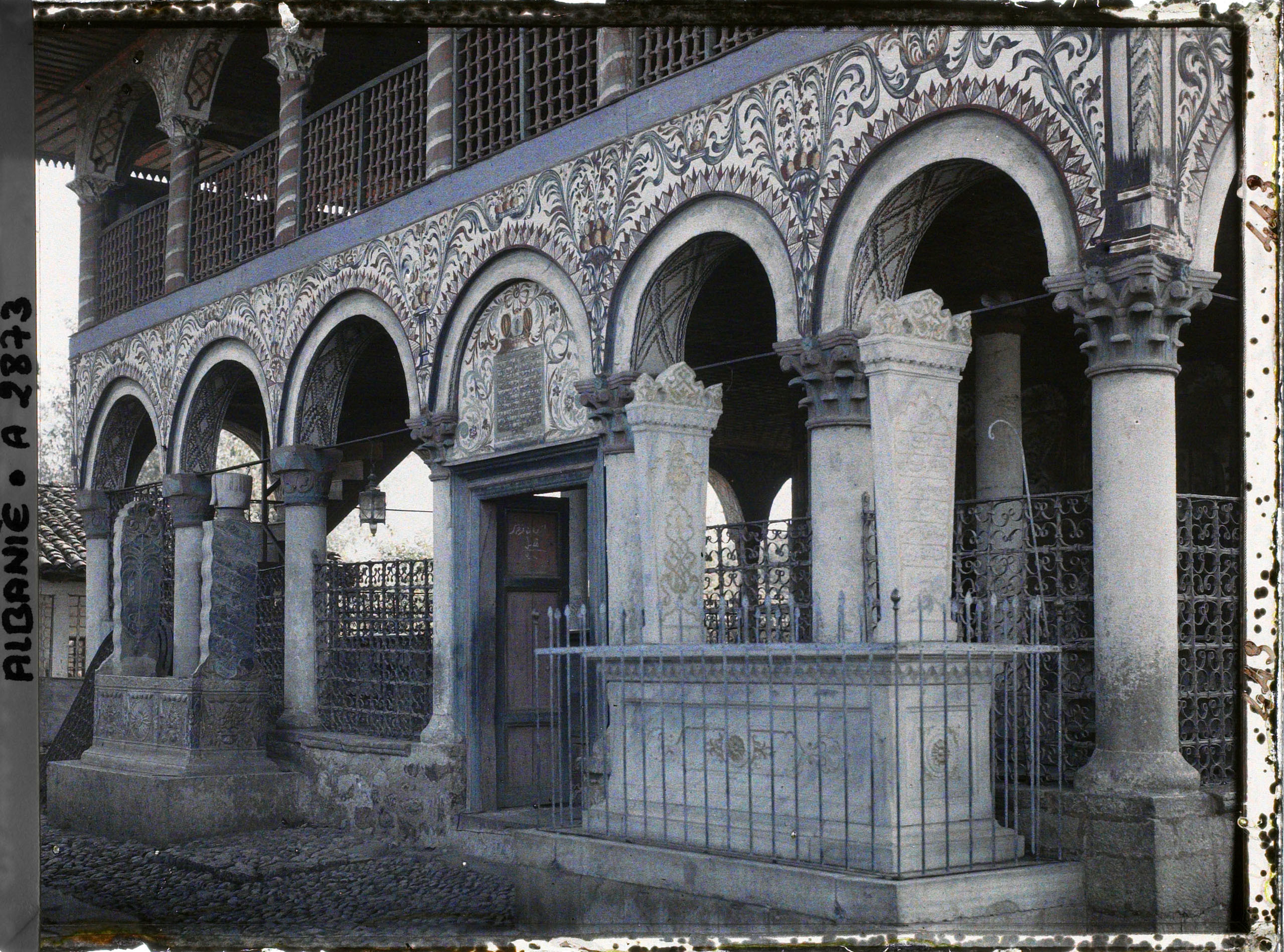
A 1913 photo of the decorated former mosque portico and former tomb

Built in 1614 CE during the Ottoman era, it was the oldest mosque of the city of Tirana and was one of the oldest mosques in Albania. The Ottoman general and ethnic Albanian, Sulejman Bargjini had fought for the Ottomans against the Safavids in Persia (Iran). The city developed in the surrounding streets.

Because of its beautiful minaret and its frescoe paintings, the Old Mosque stood in rivalry with the Et'hem Bey Mosque, founded by Sulejman Bargjini's descendant, Molla Bey of Petrela, in 1793 and finished by his son Haxhi Etëhem Bey Mollaj. Next to the Sulejman Pasha Mosque was the Tomb of Sulejman Pasha. The Kapllan Pasha Tomb is in the same neighbourhood.

The mosque was partially destroyed in November 1944, during the Second World War. Despite funds collected by the people of Tirana to rebuild the mosque, its remains and its minaret which still stood were destroyed in 1945 by the Communist government under Enver Hoxha who also destroyed the Dine Hoxha mosque in Tirana. The monument of the "Unknown Soldier" (Albanian: Ushtari i panjohur) was constructed on its site in 1949.

== See also ==
- Islam in Albania
- List of mosques in Albania
