= Folasade =

Folasade is a given Yoruba name. Notable people with the name include:

- Folasade Baderinwa (born 1969), American broadcast journalist known as Sade Baderinwa
- Folasade Ogunsola (born 1958), Nigerian microbiologist and professor
- Helen Folasade Adu (born 1959), Nigerian-born British singer known as Sade
