= Pir Salman =

Pir Salman پيرسلمان
- Village
- Location within Iran
- Coordinates: 34°42′22″N 47°27′34″E
- Country: Iran
- Province: Kermanshah
- County: Sonqor
- Bakhsh: Central
- Rural District: Sarab

Population (2006)
  - Total: 87
- Time zone: UTC+3:30 (IRST)
  - Summer (DST): UTC+4:30 (IRDT)

Pir Salman (Persian: پيرسلمان, also Romanized as Pīr Salmān; also known as Soleymānīyeh) is a village in Sarab Rural District, in the Central District of Sonqor County, Kermanshah Province, Iran. At the 2006 census, its population was 87, in 21 families.
