= Sulejman Pasha Tomb =

Ottoman tomb in Albania

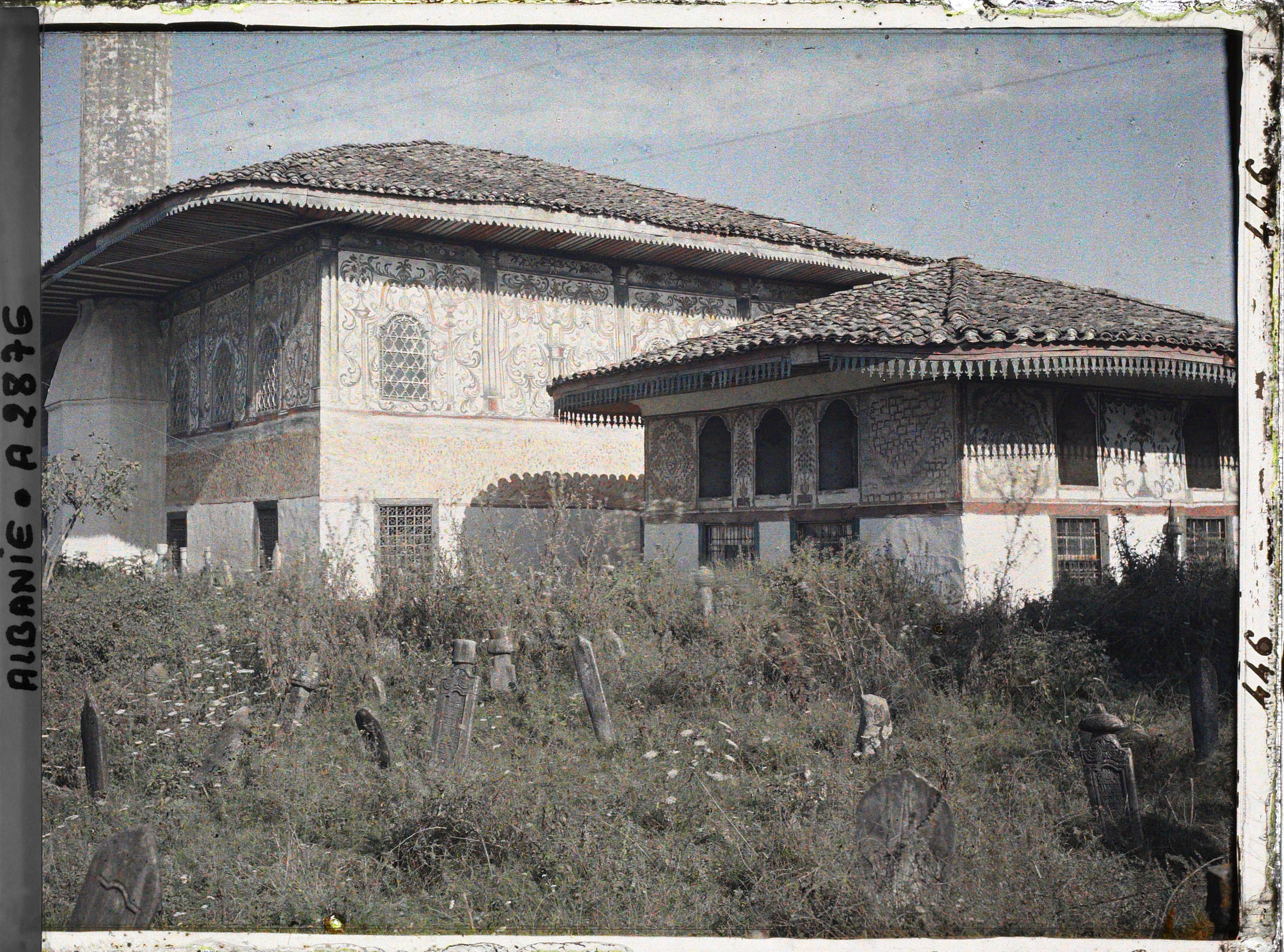
Sulejman Pasha Mosque with the tomb of Sulejman Pasha in the foreground on the right (1913).

The Sulejman Pasha Tomb (Albanian: Tyrbja e Sulejman Pashës) was the tomb of the Ottoman general of Albanian origin named Sulejman Bargjini. The tomb was ruined in November 1944 together with the Sulejman Pasha Mosque, and subsequently destroyed by the communist government. The monument of the "Unknown Soldier" (Albanian: Ushtari i panjohur) was built later upon their former location.

The former tomb was located adjacent the former Sylejman Pasha Mosque, also partially destroyed in November 1944; and razed in 1945. The Kapllan Pasha Tomb, located in the same neighborhood graveyard, remains existent.

== See also ==
- Islam in Albania
- Et'hem Bey Mosque
