= Soleymaniyeh, Kermanshah =

Soleymaniyeh سليمانيه
- Village
- Location within Iran
- Coordinates: 34°19′52″N 47°24′26″E
- Country: Iran
- Province: Kermanshah
- County: Kermanshah
- Bakhsh: Central
- Rural District: Dorudfaraman

Population (2016)
  - Total: 921
- Time zone: UTC+3:30 (IRST)
  - Summer (DST): UTC+4:30 (IRDT)

Soleymaniyeh (Persian: سليمانيه, also Romanized as Soleymānīyeh) is a village in Dorudfaraman Rural District, in the Central District of Kermanshah County, Kermanshah Province, Iran. At the 2016 census, its population was 921, in 268 families.
