= Camelia Suleiman =

American academic

Camelia Suleiman is an American academic who currently serves as professor at Michigan State University. She has also served as the Academic Director of the school's Arabic Flagship Program (2012-2017) and led the Arabic Program from 2012 to 2020. She has published Language and Identity in the Israel-Palestine Conflict: The Politics of Self-Perception (I.B. Tauris, 2011) and The Politics of Arabic in Israel: A Sociolinguistic Analysis (University of Edinburgh Press, 2017). Her third book is Arabic between State and Nation: Israel, the Levant and Diaspora (Liverpool University Press. 2022).

== Biography ==
=== Education ===
Born in Nazareth to an old family from the town, Suleiman graduated from the University of Haifa with a bachelor's degree in psychology and English Linguistics and Literature, and a master's degree in linguistics, as well as a degree in language pedagogy. Suleiman earned a Ph.D. in linguistics from Georgetown University, specializing in sociolinguistics and discourse analysis.

=== Academic career ===
Her research interest lies in the area of "language and identity in relation to gender, politicians" use of language in the media, and national identity, in both the American and the Arab countries’ contexts." She has published articles in journals including Pragmatics, Journal of Psycholinguistic Research, Middle East Critique, and Middle East Journal of Culture and Communication. She serves as an associate professor of Arabic in the Languages Department at Michigan State University and has served as the Academic Director of the school's Arabic Flagship Program until spring 2017. Suleiman also serves on the Editorial Board of 'Journal of Psycholinguistic Research', and 'Journal of Social Distress and the Homeless'.

Suleiman received a Post-Doctoral Fellowship from the Hebrew University in Jerusalem and multiple research grants in the US.

In 2017, Suleiman published 'The Politics of Arabic in Israel: A Sociolinguistic Analysis' which explores the contradictory position of Arabic being both an official language and at the same time marginalized in Israel. She concludes that 'while Palestinians lost their inheritance of the land, which has resulted in a century of political conflict, the Arabs inheritance of the Arabic language in Israel, while much less visible as a conflict, does not lack the same political intensity' (p. 206).

In 2011, Suleiman published Language and Identity in the Israel-Palestine Conflict: The Politics of Self-Perception. She drew upon her background in linguistic analysis to examine "the interplay of language and identity, feminism and nationalism, and how the concepts of spatial and temporal boundaries affect self-perception." In writing the book, she interviewed peace activists from a variety of backgrounds, including Palestinians with Israeli citizenship, Jewish Israelis, and Palestinians from Ramallah (who hold Jordanian passports). The book provided "vital first-hand analysis of the [Israel-Palestine] conflict and its impact upon both Israelis and Palestinians." Her earlier publications received media coverage, such as her work on the political styles of Bill and Hillary Clinton (co-authored with Daniel C. O'Connell) and a comparative work on the styles of Barack Obama, Madeleine Albright, Colin Powell, Condoleezza Rice, and Bill and Hillary Clinton (also co-authored with Daniel C. O'Connell).

Suleiman's third book Arabic between State and Nation: Israel, the Levant and Diaspora is published with Sussex Press (Imprint of Liverpool University Press), November 2022.

=== Personal life ===
Suleiman is married to Russell Lucas and has two children.
