= Muhammad Sulyman Al Fakki Al Shazly =

Sudanese-british writer

Mohamad Sulieman Al Fakki Al Shazly
- Born: Omdurman, Sudan
- Citizenship: Sudan; United Kingdom
- Education: University of Poitiers; University of Khartoum
- Occupations: Novelist, Storyteller, Journalist

Moḥamad Sulieman al Fakki AI Shazly (Arabic: محمد سليمان الفكي الشاذلي) (born in Omdurman) is a Sudanese-British novelist, short story writer and journalist.

== Education and career ==
He studied French language and literature at the University of Khartoum, and after obtaining a Bachelor in Arts and Education, he was sent to the French University of Poitiers as part of the programs and curricula to qualify for a bachelor's degree in Arts and Education (French Language). He worked in both Arabic and English as a writer and then as a producer of documentaries and human rights, in a number of media institutions in London, New York, Dubai, Doha and others. He took courses in American literature, and holds a degree with a distinction in American accent in Washington. He lived most of his life in London, and published stories in the Al-Sharq al-Awsat newspaper in the 1990s. He has produced television reports and films, and is also a journalist and interpreter.

== Works ==
Al Shazly has published many books including the following:

- 1983: The Seven Goodbyes (Original title: alwadaeat alsabe) (short stories)
- 1983: Silence at last (Original title: alsamt 'akhiran)
- 1984: The Forbidden Corpse (Original title: aljuthat almuharama) (short stories)
- 1985: The Old Town (Original title: almadinat alqadima) (short stories)
- 1986: The Pelican Sees Elephants (Original title: albuje aladhi yatraa filatan ) (Poetry)
- 1989: Hedgehogs cry in winter (Original title: alqanafidh tabki shta'an)
- 2014: Together to Death (Original title: meaan 'iilaa almawt) (short stories)
- 2014: My House Among the Dead (Original title: bayti bayn al'amwat) (novel)
- 2014: Bitter Blacks (Original title: alsawad almur) (novel)
- 2015: Red Light District (Original title: muqataeat aldaw' al'ahmar) (novel)
- 2016: Jewish Watches (Original title: saeat yahudia)
- 2016: A Murder in the English Countryside (Original title: jarimat qutl fi alriyf al'iinjlizii) (novel)
- 2016: The American and the Other (Original title: al'amrikiat wal'ukhraa) (novel)
- 2017: The American and the Other (Original title: al'amrikiat wal'ukhraa) (novel)
- 2018: Town Hall (Original title: dihaliz albalda) (short story collection)
- 2020: Secretarybird (a novel)
- 2023: Death, I Fear You Not (a novel)
- 2025 The Arab Man Who Never Dies

== Works in English ==
Al-Shazly does not limit himself to writing in Arabic; he also writes in English and has authored several novels and short stories. Here are some of the titles of his works:

- 1998: Swans Seen as Elephants/UK
- 2004: The Tormented Sufi/UK
- 2015: Shadow of The South/Dubai
- 2016: Jewish Watches/US
- 2017: Bitter Blackness: The Caliph Assistant Who Was Assassinated By A Yazidi Girl/US
- 2024: A War Against Sam'an or a War on Sudan

== Awards ==
He won second place in the third session of the Tayeb Salih International Prize for Written Creativity in 2013, for his short story collection “Not Silent Nature”. he also won the story Prize from the Sudan Ministry of Youth, as well as two University of Khartoum while he was student there
