= Suleman =

Suleman (سليمان, with various other transliterations) is the Arabic version of the name Solomon, the scriptural figure considered in Judeo-Christian belief to be a Jewish monarch, and additionally in Islam, an Islamic prophet. The name means 'man of peace'.

People with the name include:

- Farid Suleman, (b. ? ) chief executive officer of Citadel Broadcasting
- Babar and Haris Suleman (died 2014), American pilots
- Nadya Suleman, (b. 1975), mother of octuplets
- Suleman Dawood (b. 2004, d. 2023), son of Shahzada Dawood
- Suleman Raza, (b. 1980), Pakistani food entrepreneur and activist
- Suleman octuplets, (b. 2009)

== See also ==
- Suleiman, a related name, including a list of variants
