= Süleymaniye Hamam =

Turkish bath in Istanbul

Coordinates: 41.0159°N 28.9658°E

Süleymaniye Bath
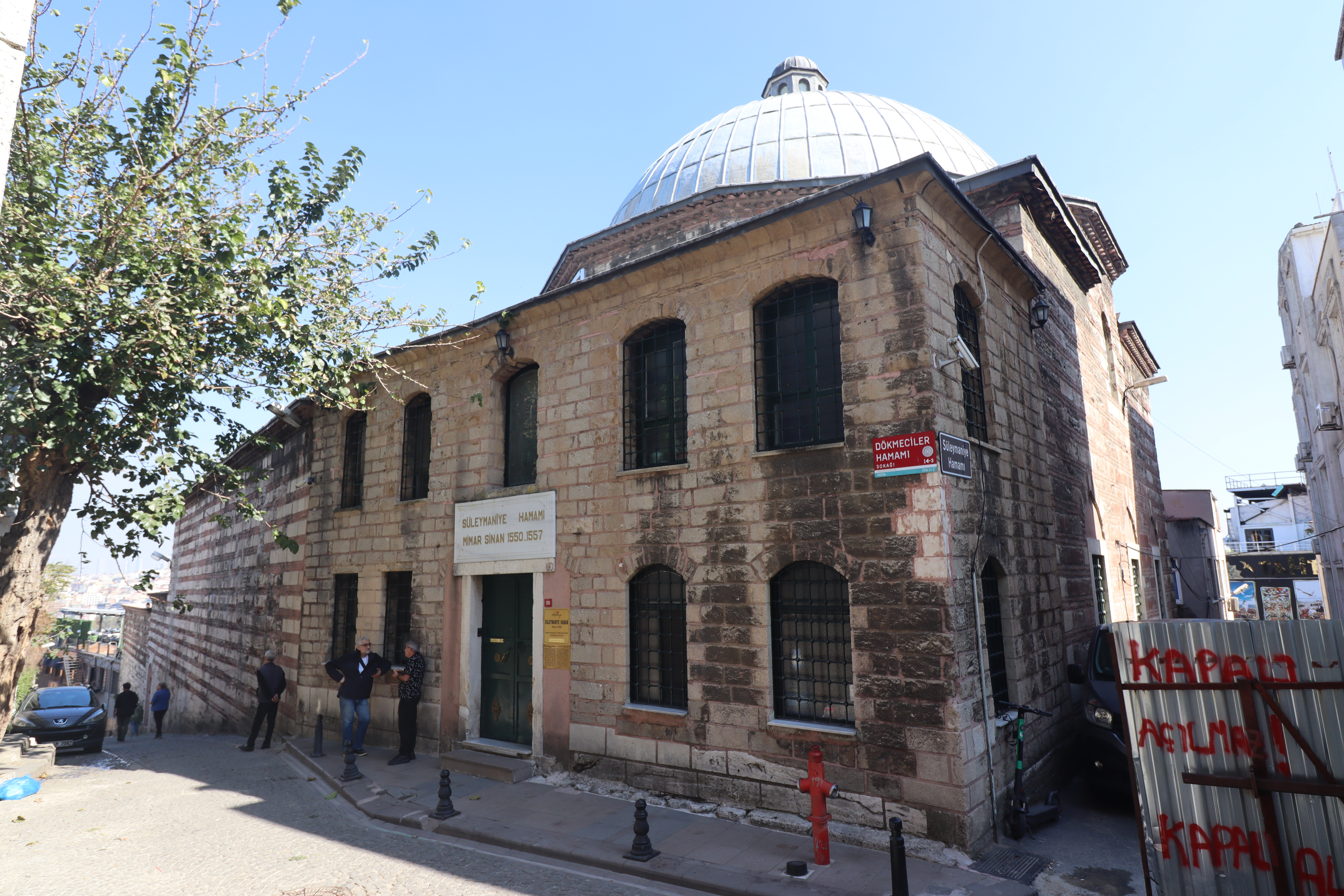
- Interactive map of the Süleymaniye Bath area

General information
- Type: Hamam
- Location: Istanbul, Turkey
- Completed: 1557

Design and construction
- Architect: Mimar Sinan

The Süleymaniye Hamam is a historic hamam (bathhouse) in Istanbul, Turkey, that forms part of the Süleymaniye Mosque complex. The building, on a hill facing the Golden Horn, was built in 1557 by Turkish architect, Mimar Sinan, and was named for his patron, Süleyman the Magnificent, who had commissioned it. It was sometimes called the 'metalworkers' bath' because many workers from the nearby foundries used to frequent it.

The building is arched and domed, with elaborate marble inlay on the walls. The Sülemaniye Hamam is a traditional bathhouse consisting of three sections: cold, lukewarm and hot. Temperatures in the hot section can reach 40–60 °C (104–140 °F) degrees. A private cubicle said to have been used by Sinan when he lived near the mosque complex from 1557 to 1588 is still preserved. Another private cubicle reserved for the sultan was later used for high-ranking theological scholars.

== Contemporary use ==
In 2001, the hamam was restored to cater for tourists. It is the only hamam in Istanbul where men and women bathe together, something that would never have happened in the past. Male attendants, called tellak, look after all the clients, again something that would never have happened in the past.

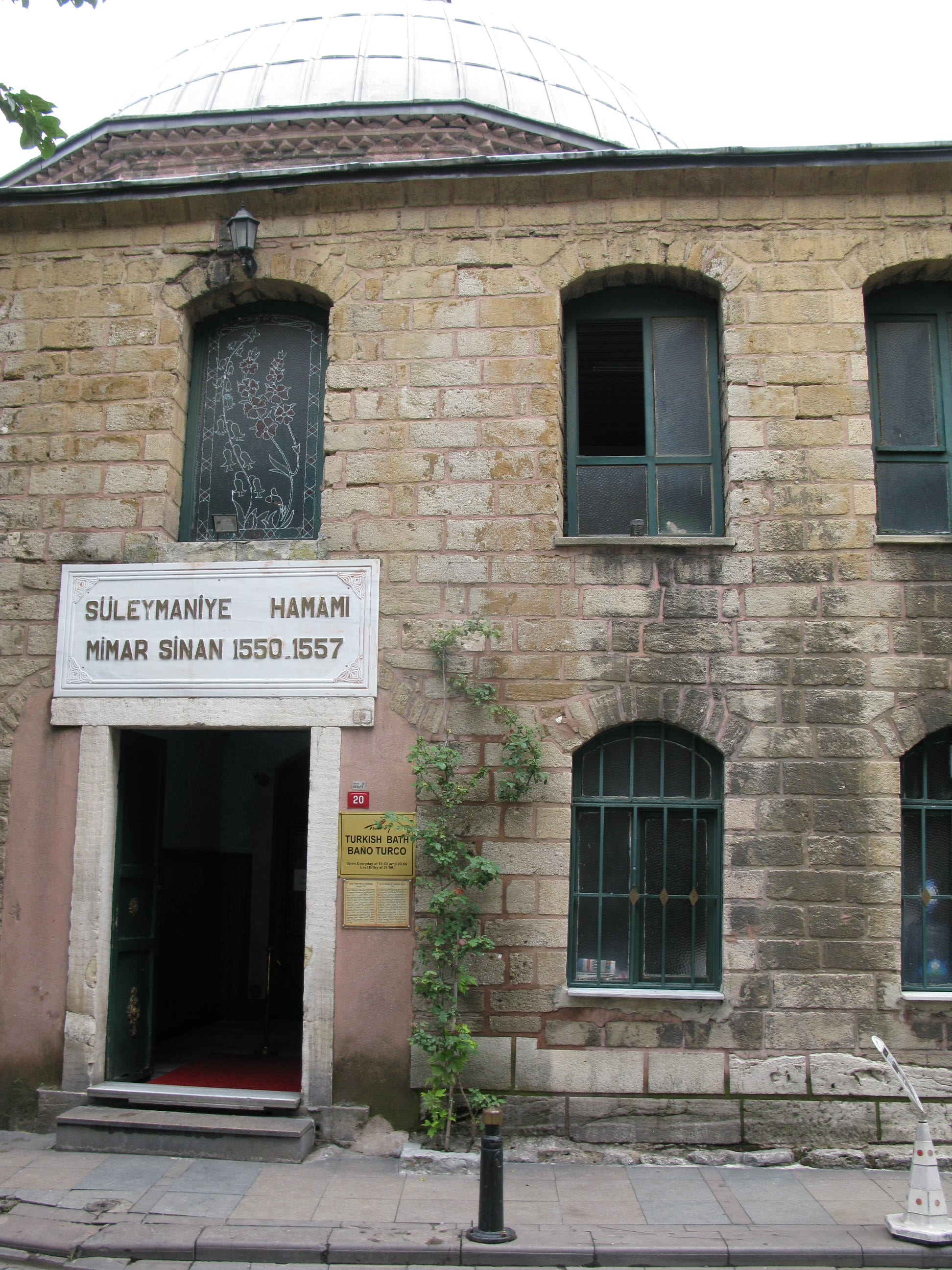
Entrance to Süleymaniye Hamam

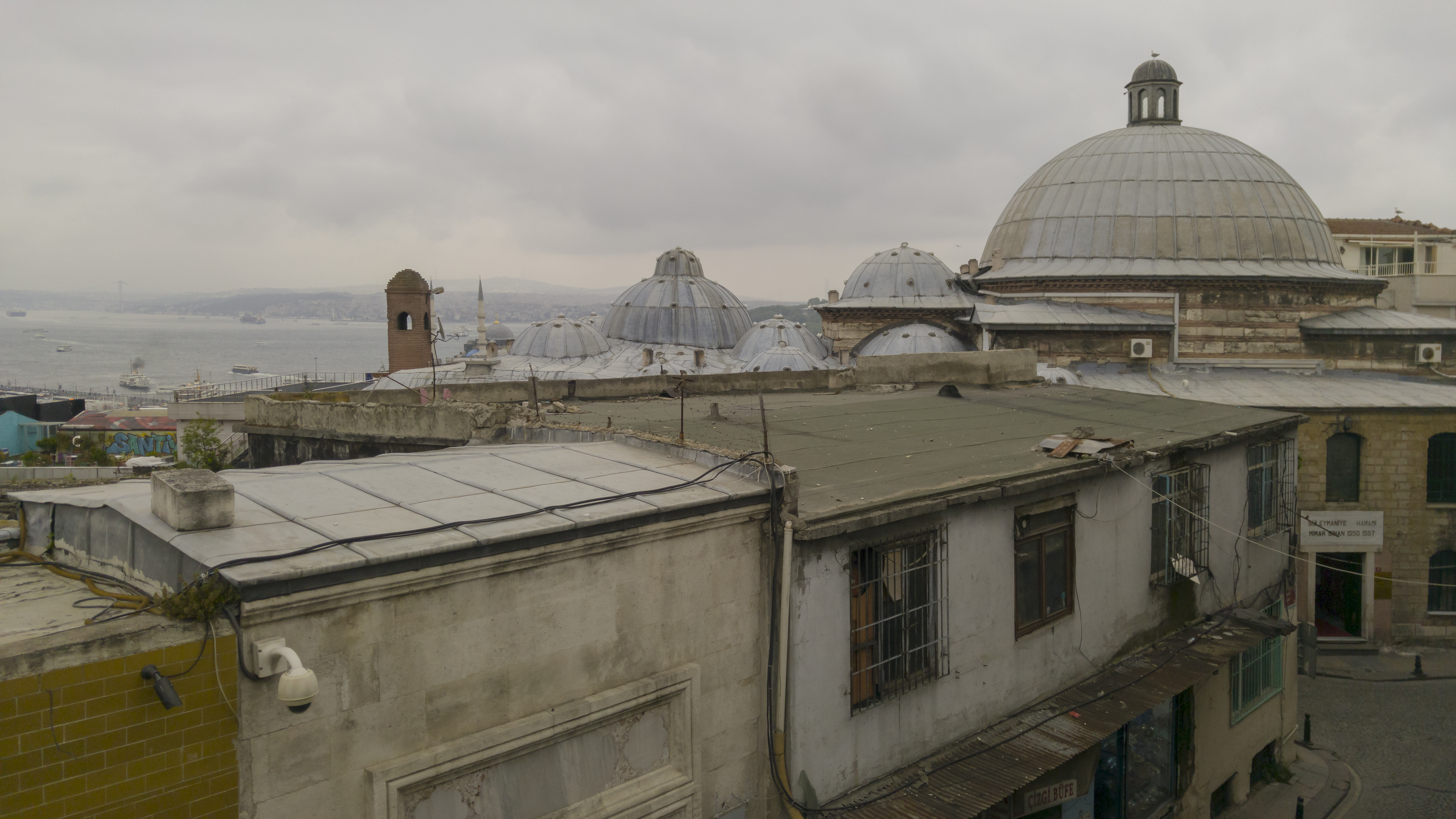
Rooftop view of the hamam and its domes
