= Sulaiman =

Sulaiman is an English transliteration of the Arabic name سليمان 'peaceful' and corresponds to the Hebrew Jewish name שְׁלֹמֹה Shlomoh and the English Solomon (/ˈsɒləmən/) . Solomon was the scriptural figure who was king of what was then the United Kingdom of Israel (c. 970–931 BCE) and is revered as a major prophet by Muslims.

Notable people with the name include:

== People with the given name Sulaiman ==
- Ebrahim Sulaiman Sait (1922–2005), Indian politician
- Ismail Sulaiman Al-Ajmi (born 1984), Omani footballer
- Sulaiman (Brunei) (15th century), fourth sultan of Brunei
- Sulaiman Abu Ghaith (born circa 1965), Al-Qaida's official spokesman
- Sulaiman Abdul Aziz Al Rajhi (born 1920), Saudi Arabian businessman
- Sulaiman Abdul Rahman Taib (21st century), Malaysian politician
- Sulaiman al-Barouni (1872–1940), ruler of Tripolitania
- Sulaiman Al-Fahim (21st century), United Arab Emirati businessman
- Sulaiman Areeb (died 1972), Urdu poet
- Sulaiman Awath Sulaiman Bin Ageel Al Nahdi (21st century), Yemeni extrajudicial prisoner of the United States
- Sulaiman Daud (1933–2010), Malaysian politician
- Sulaiman Hamad Al Gosaibi (21st century), Saudi Arabian businessman
- Sulaiman Ismail (21st century), American football wide receiver
- Sulaiman Merchant (born 1970), Indian music composer
- Sulaiman of Banjar (1761–1825), 16th Sultan of Banjar
- Sulaiman S. Olayan (1918–2002), Saudi Arabian businessman
- Sulaiman Tejan-Jalloh (21st century), Sierra Leonean politician and ambassador
- Sultan Sulaiman (1863–1938), fourth Sultan of Selangor
- Syed Sulaiman Nadvi (1884–1953), Pakistani historian and biographer
- Wael Sulaiman Al-Habashi (born 1964), Kuwaiti footballer
- Sulaiman, Prince of Xining (died 1351), Mongol prince
- Sulaiman bin Hashim (1983–2001), Singaporean murder victim and football player

== People with the surname Sulaiman ==
- José Sulaimán (1931–2014), Mexican boxing official
- Mahmud Sulaiman (20th century), Malaysian general officer
- Malik Sulaiman (born 1969), Malaysian yachtsman
- Shah Muhammad Sulaiman (born 1886), Indian judge and scientist
- Omar Bin Sulaiman (21st century), Governor of the Dubai International Financial Centre
- Sultan al-Hasan ibn Sulaiman (14th century), sultan of the island of Kilwa Kisiwani
- Sunar Sulaiman (born 1979), Indonesian footballer

== See also ==
- Suleiman, a name, including a list of variants
- Sulaiman Mountains
- Sulaymaniyah, a city in Iraqi Kurdistan
- Salim–Sulaiman, a Hindi music duo
