= Suleiman =

- Pronunciation: Arabic: [suˈlajmaːn] English: /ˈsuːləmɑːn/ or /ˌsuːleɪˈmɑːn/
- Gender: Male (forename and surname), Female (surname)

Origin
- Language: Arabic
- Origin: Hebrew
- Meaning: Man of peace
- Region of origin: Arabia, Levant

Other names
- Related names: Shlomo, Salim

Suleiman (Arabic: سُلَيْمان, romanized: sulaymān; English: /ˈsuːləmɑːn/ or /ˌsuːleɪˈmɑːn/) is the Arabic name of the Jewish and Quranic king and prophet Solomon.

Suleiman the Magnificent (1494–1566) was the longest-reigning sultan of the Ottoman Empire.

Variants of the name include Sulyman, Salamon, Salman, Salomon, Sleiman, Soleyman, Soliman, Solomon, Sulaiman, Sulayman, Sulejman, Suleman, Suleyman, Suliman, Zalman.

== People with the given name ==
People with the given name include:

=== Historical ===
- Suleyman Shah (1166–1227), according to Ottoman tradition, father of Ertugrul
- Suleiman-Shah (1117–1161), Sultan of the Great Seljuq Empire
- Suleiman ibn Qutulmish (1041–1086), founder of the Sultanate of Rum
- Süleyman Pasha (son of Orhan) (1306–1357), Ottoman prince and commander
- Süleyman Çelebi (1377–1411), de facto Ottoman ruler during the interregnum
- Suleiman the Magnificent (1494–1566), also known as Suleiman I
- Suleiman I of Persia (1648–1694), Shah of Safavid Iran
- Suleiman II of Persia (1714–1763), Safavid pretender
- Sulayman ibn al-Hakam (Suleiman II of Córdoba) (965–1016), Caliph of Córdoba
- Suleiman II (Rûm) (1166–1204), Seljuk Sultan of Rûm between 1196 and 1204
- Suleiman II (1642–1691), Ottoman Sultan 1687–1691
- Suleiman bin Abdullah Al Sheikh (1785–1818), Wahhabi scholar
- Hadım Suleiman Pasha (governor of Rumelia), military commander under the reign of Mehmed II

=== Contemporary ===
- Suleiman Al Abbas, Syrian politician
- Suleiman Arabiyat (1938–2013), Jordanian academic and politician
- Suleiman Braimoh (born 1989), Nigerian-American basketball player in the Israel Basketball Premier League
- Suleiman Frangieh (1910–1992), President of Lebanon 1970 to 1976
- Suleiman Frangieh Jr. (born 1965), Lebanese politician and MP, leader of the Marada Movement
- Suleiman Hafez (born 1941), Jordanian economist and politician
- Suleiman Kassim, Nigerian politician
- Suleiman Khan, Ilkhan of Persia (ruled 1339–1344)
- Suleiman Mousa (1919–2008), Jordanian author and historian
- Suleiman Al Najjab (1934–2001), Palestinian activist and communist politician
- Suleiman Obeid (1984–2025), Palestinian footballer
- Suleiman Pasha (disambiguation), multiple people
- Sulieman Benn (born 1981), West Indian cricketer
- Süleyman Demirel (1924–2015), former President of Turkey

=== Celebrities ===
- Soliman Eid (1961–2025), Egyptian Actor
- Sulaiman Merchant, Indian music composer

== People with the surname ==
- Abdulrahman Suleiman (born 1984), Qatari middle-distance runner
- Abu Bakar Suleiman (born 1944), Malaysian physician, academic administrator, business executive and former civil servant
- Abubakar Umar Suleiman (born 1962), 11th Emir of Bade
- Adamu Suleiman (1929–??), Nigerian policeman and former Inspector General
- Ahmed Suleiman (born 1992), Nigerian footballer
- Ali Suliman (born 1977), Palestinian actor
- Amna Suleiman (born 1988), teacher and advocate for women's cycling in Gaza
- CA Suleiman, writer, game designer, and musician
- Camelia Suleiman, American academic
- Carmen Suleiman (born 1994), Egyptian singer
- Dan Suleiman (1942–2023), Nigerian Air Force officer and politician
- Elia Suleiman (born 1960), filmmaker and actor
- Haroun Suleiman (born 1953), Zanzibari politician
- Iszlam Monier Suliman (born 1990), Hungarian Sudanese judoka
- Jaffar Suleiman, Indian cricketer
- Jamal Suliman (born 1959), prominent Syrian-born producer, director, and actor
- Khalid Suliman (born 1987), professional basketball player
- Khalid Suleiman Chibuikem (born 2001), Nigerian singer and songwriter
- Khalifah Suleiman (born 1953), Jordanian jurist and politician
- Khalil Suleiman (1943/44–2002), Palestinian doctor
- Linda Suleiman, American physician
- Malina Suliman (born 1990), Afghan artist
- Mari ibn Suleiman, 12th-century Nestorian Christian author
- Martin Suleiman, South Sudanese footballer
- Michel Suleiman (born 1948), president of Lebanon and former commander in chief of that country's armed forces
- Mim Suleiman, singer, songwriter, composer, performer, workshop facilitator, and campaigner from Zanzibar
- Mohamed Suleiman (born 1969), Qatari middle-distance runner
- Mohamud Hassan Suleiman, Somali politician
- Muhammad Suleiman (1959–2008), Syrian Army general
- Omar Suleiman (imam) (born 1986), American Muslim scholar
- Omar Suleiman (politician) (1936–2012), vice-president of Egypt
- Rashid Seif Suleiman (born 1954), Zanzibar politician
- Salamatu Hussaini Suleiman, Nigerian lawyer
- Saleh Suleiman (1888–1980), Israeli Arab politician
- Samaila Suleiman (born 1981), Member of the House of Representatives of Nigeria
- Yasir Suleiman, Palestinian academic

== See also ==
- Islamic view of Solomon
- Slimane
- Suleimani (disambiguation)
- Süleymanoğlu
- Sulliman
