= Sulyman Kawu =

Chief Judge of Kwara State, Nigeria

Sulyman Durosylorun Kawu

Chief Judge of Kwara State
- Incumbent
- Assumed office 2014

Personal details
- Occupation: Judge

Sulyman Durosylorun Kawu is a Nigerian judge who is currently serving as the Chief Judge of Kwara State since 2014. He was appointed by Governor Abdulfatah Ahmed on the recommendation of the Kwara State Judicial Service Commission.

During a swearing in of judges in 2017, Kawu warned judicial officials that corrupt judges who take bribes to give biased judgement would go to hell.

In the wake of COVID-19 pandemic in 2020, Kawu granted amnesty to 46 inmates awaiting trial at the Oke-Kura maximum and Mandala Medium prisons in Ilorin.
