= Sleiman =

Sleiman is an alternative spelling for Suleiman (سليمان), meaning 'man of peace'. Notable people with the name include:

== People with the given name ==
- Sleiman Frangieh, also known as Suleiman Frangieh (1910–1992), President of Lebanon from 1970 to 1976
- Sleiman Hajjar (1950–2002), the Melkite Catholic bishop of Canada

== People known by the mononym ==
- Sleiman (rapper), Danish rapper

== People with the surname ==
- Ali Sleiman (born 1947), Lebanese fencer
- Haaz Sleiman, American actor originally from Lebanon
- Michel Sleiman, also known as Michel Suleiman, (born 1948), the President of Lebanon
- Nay Sleiman, Lebanese pop singer
- Rola Sleiman (born c. 1975), Lebanese-Syrian pastor
- Samir Sleiman, Liberal Party of Canada candidate, 2008 Canadian federal election
- Wafaa Sleiman (born 1952), the First Lady of Lebanon (since 2008), wife of President Michel Sleiman

== See also ==
- Suleiman], a name, including a list of variants
- Slimane (singer) (Slimane Nebchi, born 1989), French singer of Algerian descent
