= Suleymaniye Mosque (Rhodes) =

Former mosque in Rhodes, Greece

- Σουλεϊμανιγιέ Τζαμί; Süleymaniye Camii
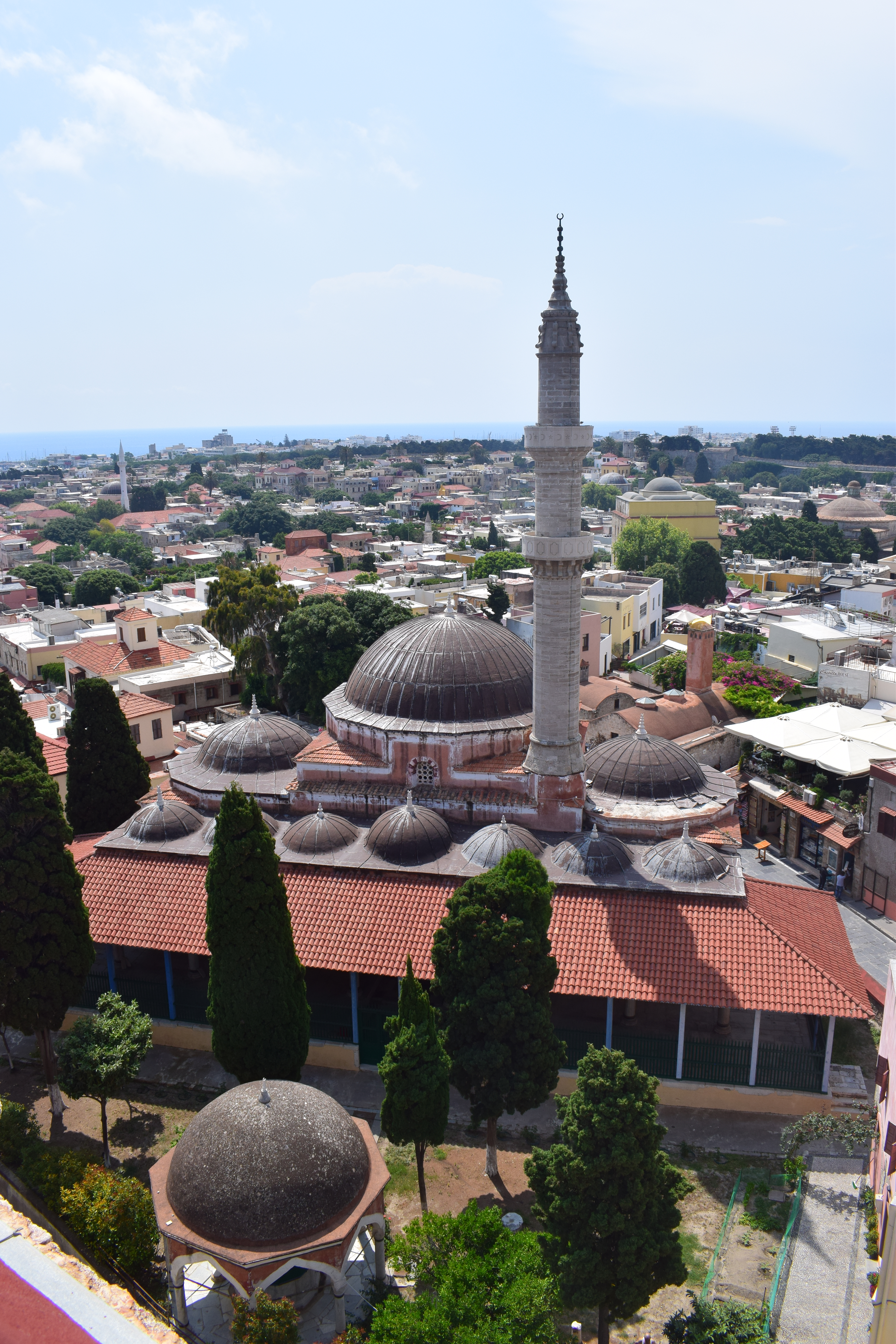

- Location of the former mosque in Greece

Religion
- Affiliation: Islam (former)
- Ecclesiastical or organizational status: Mosque (1523–2014)
- Status: Closed (pending restoration)

Location
- Location: Old Town, Rhodes, South Aegean
- Country: Greece
- Interactive map of Suleymaniye Mosque
- Coordinates: 36°26′40″N 28°13′27″E

Architecture
- Type: Mosque
- Founder: Suleiman the Magnificent
- Completed: c. 1523 (original); 1808 (reconstructed)

Specifications
- Dome: 3
- Minaret: 1
- Minaret height: 34.5 m (113 ft)

The Suleymaniye Mosque or the Mosque of Suleiman (Greek: Σουλεϊμανιγιέ Τζαμί; Turkish: Süleymaniye Camii) is a former mosque in the city of Rhodes, in the South Aegean region of Greece. It was originally built after the Ottoman conquest of Rhodes in 1522 and is named after Sultan Suleiman to commemorate his conquest. The mosque was reconstructed in 1808, has been restored several times since, and has been closed for worship since 2014, pending further restoration. It is the most significant surviving Ottoman-era monument in Rhodes.

== History ==
This mosque was the first in the town of Rhodes, built after it was captured by the Ottomans in the siege of Rhodes in 1522. Local tradition holds that the mosque was built on the site of a previous church. The mosque's construction is thus dated to around 1522–1523; and is named after Sultan Suleiman, who led the Ottoman invasion. The 17th-century Ottoman writer and traveler, Evliya Çelebi, reported the presence of an inscription on the minaret which recorded repairs effected in 940 AH (1533/1534 CE).

In 1808, the mosque was rebuilt, following the same design as the original mosque. It was partially restored prior to a visit by Sultan Abdulaziz (r. 1861–1876). The 1856 earthquake caused damage to the mosque. That same year, a gunpowder magazine under the nearby Church of Saint John was struck by lightning, causing a massive explosion that destroyed the church and further damaged the mosque. A decision to repair the building was eventually taken in 1892. The minaret, which originally had just one balcony, was rebuilt with two balconies at this time or earlier in 1863.

The minaret was repaired again in 1925, but was demolished in 1987 due to structural problems. Major restoration and reconstruction on the whole mosque began in 1988 and were completed in 2005. Europa Nostra gave this mosque an honorary distinction in 2006. The mosque was closed in 2014 pending further restoration, although is open for special occasions.

== Architecture ==
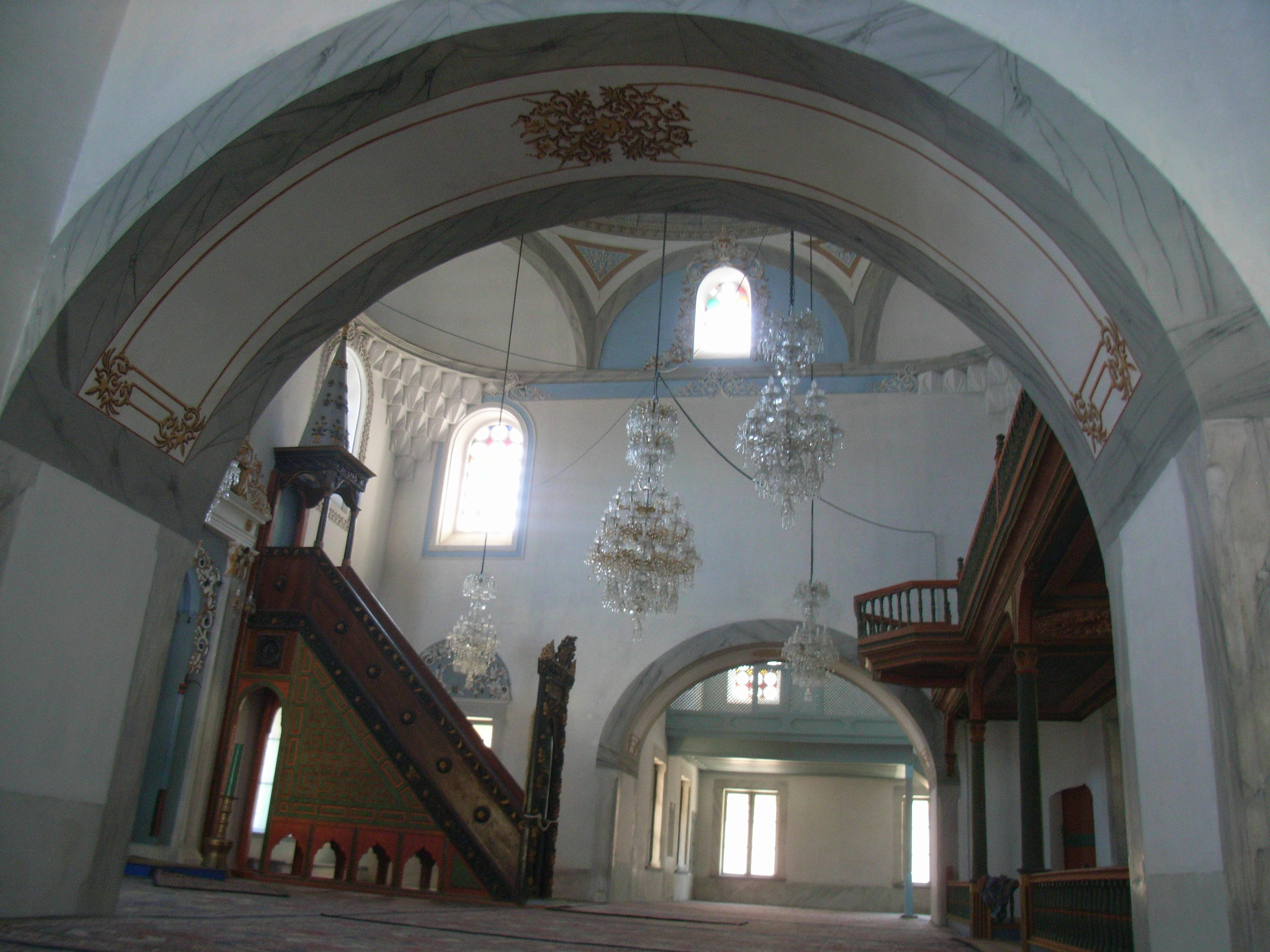
Interior of the mosque

The mosque's design reflects an earlier period of Ottoman architecture when mosques were adjoined by tabhanes (hospices for Sufis). The prayer hall today consists of three domed chambers. The central room is covered by a large, high dome and is flanked on either side by a room with a smaller and lower dome. The central room also contains a mihrab (niche indicating the direction of prayer) and a minbar (pulpit) made of walnut wood. Originally, the central room would have been the prayer hall or mosque proper, while the side rooms would have served as tabhanes. At some later period, these three rooms were joined to former a larger prayer hall.

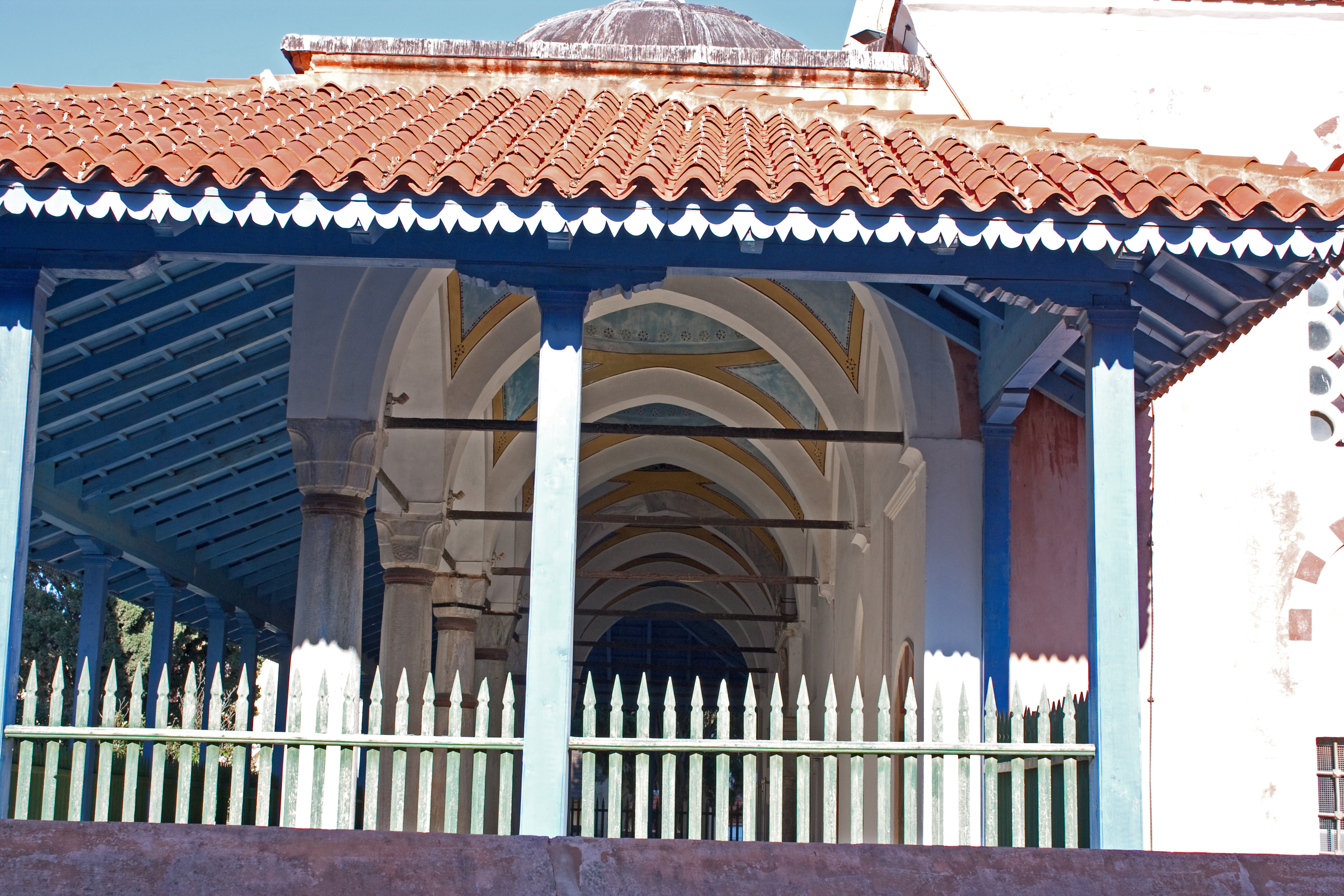
Entrance porticos in front of the mosque (side view)

On the outside, the mosque is fronted by a double narthex with an outer and inner portico. The inner portico is covered by seven domes and supported by eight columns, while the outer portico is covered by a sloped lead roof supported on more columns.

The entrance doorway to the mosque is an ornate marble archway carved with flowers and other motifs. This portal formerly belonged to a funerary monument built by the Knights Hospitaller in 1510–1520, which was probably part of the Church of Saint John that was destroyed in the 1856 explosion. The portal was moved and incorporated into the mosque in 1863. It may have originally been a work imported from Italy by the Knights.

Because mosques are required to be aligned with the qibla (direction of prayer), which did not necessarily match the orientation of existing streets and of surrounding buildings, the construction of new mosques in the city often involved clearing additional neighboring structures to accommodate the building's orientation. This left an open space of irregular shape on the northwest side of the mosque (in front of its entrance), which was turned into a public square with a fountain for ablutions. The fountain in front of the Suleymaniye Mosque has an octagonal base with eight spoliated columns supporting a dome.

== See also ==
- Islam in Greece
- List of former mosques in Greece
- Ottoman Greece
