= Soleymaniyeh, Kerman =

Soleymaniyeh سليمانيه
- Village
- Location within Iran
- Coordinates: 29°22′42″N 55°41′00″E
- Country: Iran
- Province: Kerman
- County: Sirjan
- Bakhsh: Central
- Rural District: Najafabad

Population (2006)
  - Total: 681
- Time zone: UTC+3:30 (IRST)
  - Summer (DST): UTC+4:30 (IRDT)

Soleymaniyeh (Persian: سليمانيه, also Romanized as Soleymānīyeh; also known as Soleymānī) is a village in Najafabad Rural District, in the Central District of Sirjan County, Kerman Province, Iran. At the 2006 census, its population was 681, in 174 families.
