= Mohamed Yousef Soliman =

Egyptian petroleum engineer

Mohamed Y. Soliman
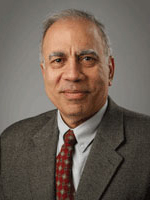

Former chairman and Professor of Bob L. Herd Department of Petroleum Engineering, Texas Tech University
- In office 1 January 2011 – 30 December 2012
- Preceded by: Lloyd Heinze
- Succeeded by: Marshall Watson

Personal details
- Born: Mohamed Yousef Soliman; 1 January 1948 (age 78) Cairo, Egypt
- Education: Cairo University; Stanford University
- Profession: professor of Petroleum Engineering, author
- Website: website

Mohamed Yousef Soliman is a professor and the former chairperson of the department of Petroleum Engineering at Texas Tech University. After working for Halliburton for 32 years, he joined Texas Tech in January 2011.

== Education ==
He obtained his bachelor's degree in petroleum engineering from Cairo University in 1971. Having completed his bachelor's degree he came to the United States to continue higher education. He received his master's degree and doctorate degrees, both in Petroleum engineering, from Stanford University in 1975 and 1978 His M. S. Thesis was "Rheological Properties of Emulsion Flowing Through Capillary Tubes Under Turbulent Conditions,"; his PhD thesis, "Numerical Modeling of Thermal Recovery Processes."

== Biography ==
Soliman is a specialist in hydraulic fracturing and production engineering. He holds 21 patents on Hydraulic fracturing operations and analysis, testing and conformance applications, and is an author or co-author of over 170 technical papers and articles in areas of fracturing, reservoir engineering, well test analysis, conformance, and numerical simulation.

He has written chapters in World Oil's Handbook of Horizontal Drilling and Completion Technology, the text Well Construction, and the SPE monograph Well Test Analysis of Hydraulically Fractured Wells. He has authored several books for internal use at Halliburton, including Stimulation and Reservoir Engineering Aspects of Horizontal Wells, Well Test Analysis, Hydraulic Fracturing, and chapters in Conformance, Stimulation, and FracPac. He is a distinguished member of the Society of Petroleum Engineers.

== Most recent peer-reviewed papers ==
- Fahd Siddiqui, Mohamed Y. Soliman, Waylon House, Akif Ibragimov "Pre-Darcy flow revisited under experimental investigation" Journal of Analytical Science and Technology, Volume 7, January 2016,
- Lidia Bloshanskaya, Akif Ibragimov, Fahd Siddiqui, Mohamed Y. Soliman "Productivity Index for Darcy and pre-/post-Darcy Flow (Analytical Approach)" Journal of Analytical Science and Technology, December 2015,
- Fahd Siddiqui, Mohamed Y. Soliman, Waylon House, "A new methodology for analyzing non-Newtonian fluid flow tests" Journal of Petroleum Science and Engineering, Volume 124, December 2014, Pages 173–179, ISSN 0920-4105
- M. Y. Soliman, Johan Daal, and Loyd East. " Fracturing Unconventional Formations to Enhance Productivity." Journal of Natural Gas Science and Engineering Invitational paper. 8 (2012) 52–67.
- Soliman, M. Y.; Kabir, C. S. (2012). "Testing unconventional formations". Journal of Petroleum Science & Engineering. 92–93: 102–109. Bibcode:2012JPSE...92..102S. doi:10.1016/j.petrol.2012.04.027.
- Leopoldo Sierra, Loyd East, M.Y. Soliman, and David Kulakofsky. 2011New Completion Methodology To Improve Oil Recovery and Minimize Water Intrusion in Reservoirs Subject to Water Injection, SPE Journal, September 2011.
- Loyd East Jr., M.Y. Soliman, and Jody Augustine. 2011. Methods for Enhancing Far- Field Complexity in Fracturing Operations. SPE Production Operations, August 2011.
- M.Y. Soliman, Carlos Miranda, Hong (Max) Wang, and Kim Thornton, Investigation of Effect of Fracturing Fluid on After-Closure Analysis in Gas Reservoirs. Production & Operations SPE Journal, May 2011
