= Solomon (disambiguation) =

Solomon is a figure identified in the Old Testament (Hebrew Bible) as the king of Israel, and the son of King David.

Solomon may also refer to:

== Arts and entertainment ==
- Solomon (Boyce), a 1742 serenata
- Solomon (Handel), a 1748 oratorio
- Solomon, a 2017 album by Calan
- Solomon (film), a 1997 Biblical film

== People ==
- Solomon (name), including a list of people with the mononym, given name or surname
- Suleiman, a name, including a list of variants

== Places ==
=== United States ===
- Solomon River (Alaska), river in Alaska
  - Solomon, Alaska, unincorporated community near the river
- Solomon, Illinois, unincorporated community
- Solomon River, river in Kansas
  - Solomon, Kansas, city located along the river
- Solomons, Maryland, census-designated place
- Solomon Lake, lake in Minnesota
- Solomon Creek, creek in Pennsylvania

=== Elsewhere ===
- Division of Solomon, in the Northern Territory, Australia
- Solomon, village in the commune of Gârbou, Sălaj County, Romania
- Solomon Islands, country in Oceania

== Other uses ==
- Solomon Airlines, a national airline of the Solomon Islands
- Solomon, a size of wine bottle
- Solomon, a software business acquired by Microsoft Dynamics 365
- Operation Solomon, a 1991 Jewish evacuation mission from Ethiopia

== See also ==
- Solomon Grundy (disambiguation)
- Solomonic (disambiguation)
- Solomons (disambiguation)
- The Kingdom of Solomon, Iranian film
- Solomontown, South Australia, a place
