= Sulayman =

Arabic male given name

Sulayman (Arabic: سُلِيمَان sulaymān) is an Arabic name of the Biblical king and Islamic prophet Solomon meaning 'man of peace', derived from the Hebrew name Shlomo.

The name Sulayman is a diminutive of the name Salman (سَلْمان salmān), both of which stem from the male noun Salaam.

Notable people with the name include:

== People with the mononym or honorific title ==
- Sulayman ibn Abd al-Malik (674-717), Umayyad caliph
- Sulayman ibn Hisham, Umayyad prince and Arab general
- Suleiman the Magnificent, longest-reigning Great Sultan of the Ottoman Empire
- Sulayman ibn al-Hakam, or Sulayman II or Sulayman al-Musta'in (died 1016), fifth Umayyad ruler of Córdoba
- Sulayman ibn Abdallah ibn Tahir, ninth century Abbasid official from Tahirīd family in the service of the Abbasid Caliphate.
- Sulayman of Mali, 14th century Mansa of the Mali Empire.
- Sulaiman al-Tajir ('Sulayman the Merchant', fl. 850), explorer and trader who wrote on India and China
- Sulayman al-Qunduzi, alleged author of Yanabi al-Muwadda
- Rajah Sulayman (1558–1575), the last raja or King of Manila.
- Sulayman ibn Wahb (died 885), senior official of the Abbasid Caliphate serving as vizier.

== People with the given name ==
- Sulayman ibn Abi Ja'far, early 9th century governor and politician of Arab Abbasid Caliphate.
- Sulayman ibn Umar ibn Abd al-Aziz, was an Umayyad prince, son of Umayyad caliph Umar II (r. 717–720)
- Sulayman ibn Yazid ibn Abd al-Malik, was an Umayyad prince, son of Umayyad caliph Yazid II (r. 720–724)
- Sulayman ibn Musa al-Hadi, was an Abbasid prince and son of Caliph Al-Hadi.
- Sulayman Bal (died 1775), 18th-century African leader, warrior, and Islamic scholar
- Sulayman Marreh (born 1996), Gambian football (soccer) player
- Sulayman al-Nabulsi (1908–1976), Jordanian politician, Prime Minister of Jordan in 1956–57
- Sulayman Solong, Darfuri sultan
- Sulayman Pasha al-Azm (died 1743), Ottoman governor of Sidon Eyalet, Damascus Eyalet, and Egypt Eyalet
- Sulayman Pasha al-Adil (c. 1760s–1819), Ottoman governor of Sidon Eyalet
- Sulayman Reis (died 1620), 17th-century Dutch corsair and later Ottoman Captain and Barbary corsair
- Sulayman Abu Gayeth (born 1965), Kuwaiti, one of Al-Qaeda's spokesmen
- Sulayman al-Hawwat (1747–1816), Moroccan historian, biographer and poet
- Sulayman S. Nyang, professor of African Studies at Howard University

== People with the surname ==
- Hikmat Sulayman (1889–1964), Iraqi politician and prime minister of Iraq (1936 to 1937) at the head of a Party of National Brotherhood government
- Mohamed Sedki Sulayman (1919–1996), Egyptian politician and Prime Minister of Egypt (1966 to 1967)
- Tarik Sulayman, individual associated with the Battle of Bangkusay Channel
- Sulayman Al-Bassam (born 1972), Kuwaiti playwright and theatre director
- Sulayman Keeler, leader of Ahlus Sunnah wal Jamaah, a British Islamist organisation

== See also ==
- Suleiman, a name, including a list of variants
- Solomon in Islam
- Sulaymani, Islamic community
- Sulayman Mountain (also known as Taht-I-Suleiman, Sulayman Rock or Sulayman Throne), World Heritage Site in Kyrgyzstan
- Bani Sulayman, village in Yemen
- Khan Sulayman Pasha, large khan (caravanserai) in the Old City of Damascus
- Plaza Rajah Sulayman, public square in Malate, Manila.
