= Süleymanoğlu =

Süleymanoğlu is a Turkish surname. It is formed by adding the Turkish patronymic suffix -oğlu with the meaning "son of" to the Muslim masculine given name Sulayman (Arabic: سُـلَـيْـمَـان), equivalent to Solomon. Notable people with the surname include:

- Hafız Süleymanoğlu (born 1967), Turkish weightlifter of Azerbaijani origin
- Naim Süleymanoğlu (1967–2017), Turkish world and Olympic champion weightlifter of Bulgarian origin
- Nurhan Süleymanoğlu (born 1971), Turkish boxer of Kazakh origin
