= Sulejman Bargjini =

Founder of Tirana

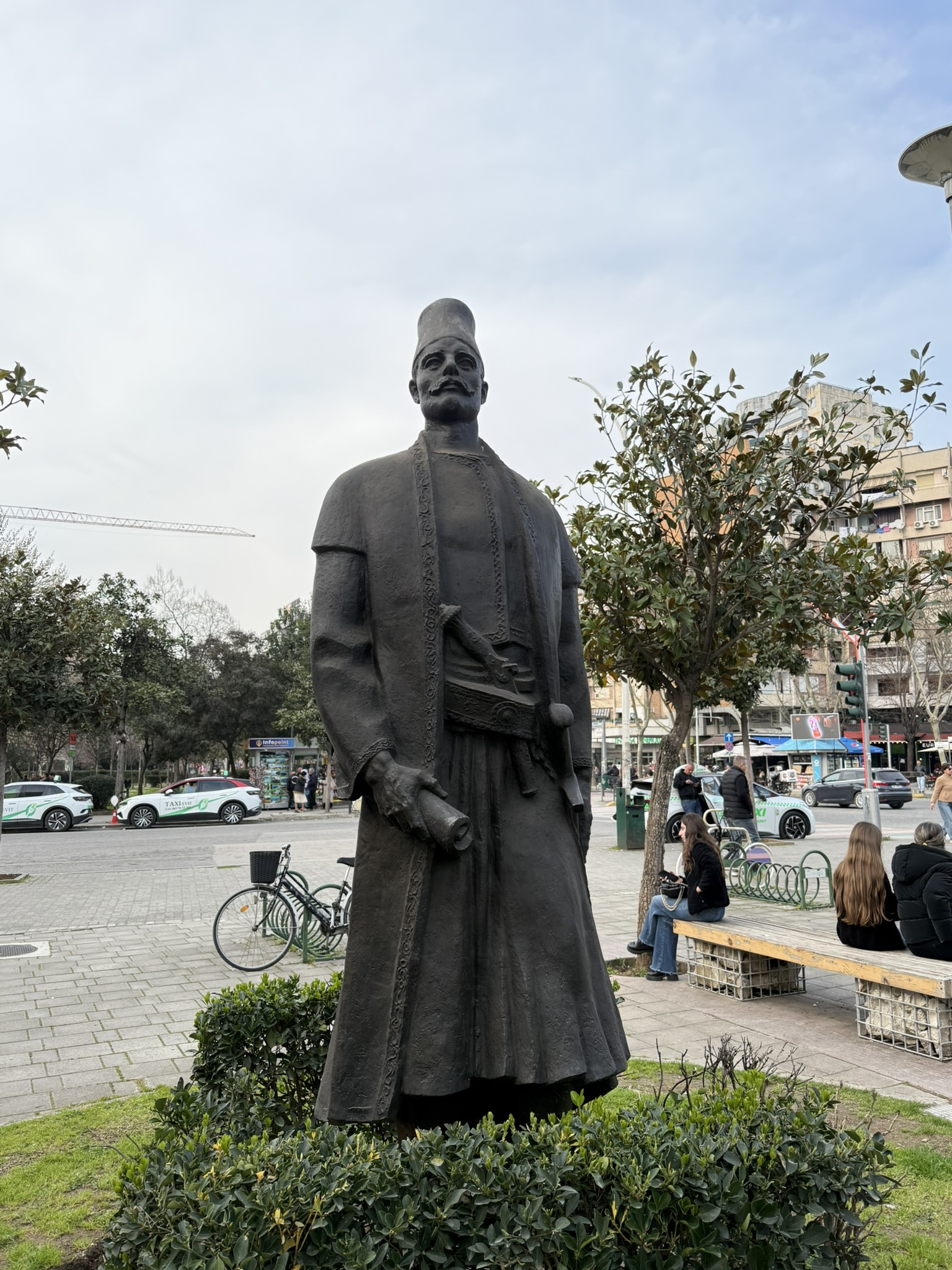
The Suleiman Pasha statue in Tirana

Sulejman Pasha Bargjini (also known in Albanian: Sylejman Pashë Mulleti, Turkish: Berkinzâde Süleyman Paşa) was an Ottoman Albanian general, nobleman, Governor of the Ottoman Empire and founder of the present-day Albanian capital of Tirana. He was originally from Bargjin, but he settled in the village of Mullet (present-day Albania) and probably served as a Janissary, he was given the title Pasha. He had fought for the Ottomans against the Safavids in Persia. After that he had built a mosque (the Sylejman Pasha Mosque), a bakery and a hammam (Islamic sauna). He founded the settlement of Tirana, now the capital of Albania, in 1614 as an oriental-style town of those times. According to some local legends, he named the town he founded after Tehran, the capital of Persia (nowadays Iran). This, however, is a folk etymology without basis in fact, as Tirana was already mentioned in Venetian documents as early as 1418.

With Sulejman's foundations, Tirana soon became the center of Albanian art, culture and religion (especially with the Spread of Islam and the Bektashi Sufism), it became famous because of its strategic position at the heart of Albania.

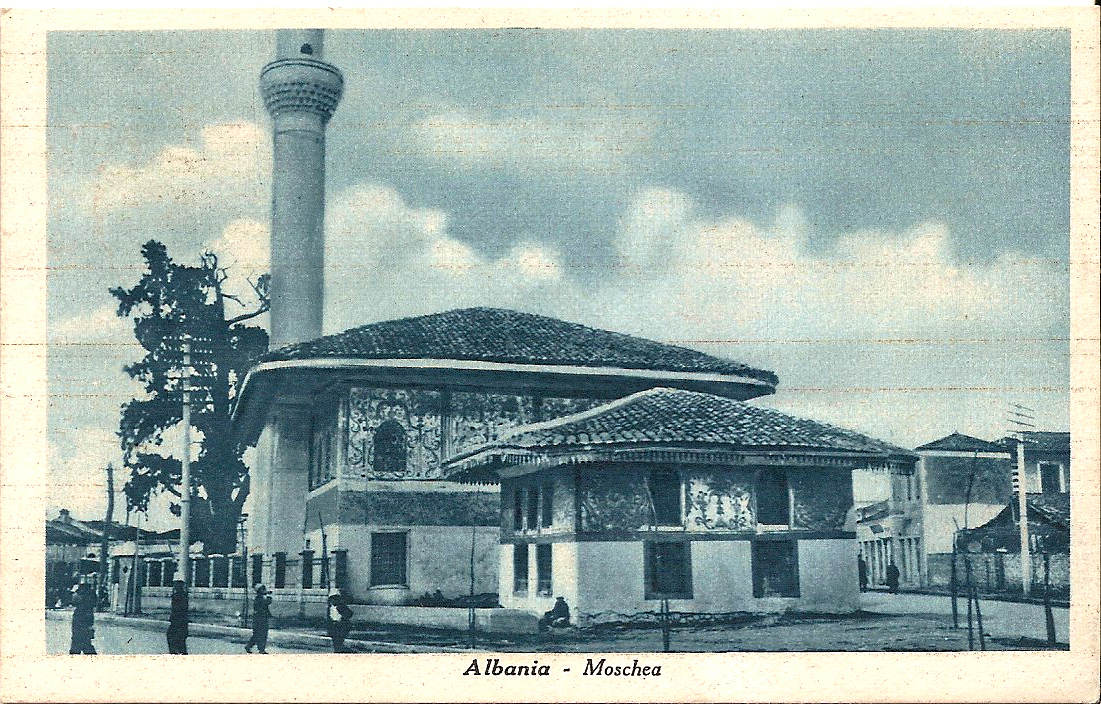
Suleyman Pasha Tomb and its adjacent mosque in a 1939 postcard.

His resting place, the Suleyman Pasha Tomb, got destroyed by the Communist government. A statue of Sulejman Pasha stands in the square named after him in downtown Tirana. A small street in another part of Tirana also bears his name.

== See also ==
- Molla Bey of Petrela
- Etëhem Bey Mollaj
