= Saul (surname) =

Saul is a surname. Notable people with the surname include:

- Andrew Saul (born 1946), chairman of the Federal Retirement Thrift Investment Board
- April Saul (born 1955), American Pulitzer Prize-winning journalist
- Bernard Francis Saul (1872-1931), American banker
- Berrick Saul, CBE (1924-2016), Vice-Chancellor of the University of York
- Bernard Saul II, American businessman
- Bill Saul (1940-2006), American National Football League player
- Frank Saul (basketball) (1924-2019), American former National Basketball Association player
- Frank Saul (footballer) (born 1943), English former footballer
- Jack Saul, South African-Israeli tennis player
- John Saul (disambiguation)
- John Hennessy Saul (1819–1897), Irish-born American horticulturist and landscape architect
- Nigel Saul (born 1952), British historian
- Oscar Saul (1912-1994), American screenwriter
- Peter Saul (born 1934), American painter
- Rich Saul (1948-2012), American National Football League player, twin brother of Ron
- Richard Saul (1891-1965), Irish air marshal
- Roger Saul (born 1950), British businessman, the founder of the Mulberry (company) fashion chain
- Ron Saul (1948–2021), American National Football League player, twin brother of Rich
- Terry Saul (1921–1976), Choctaw/Chickasaw illustrator, painter, muralist, commercial artist, and educator
- William Saul, Canadian politician in British Columbia
