= Bernard Saul =

Bernard Saul may refer to:

- Bernard Saul II (born 1932), American billionaire heir and businessman
- Bernard Francis Saul (1872–1931), his grandfather, American banker and businessman

== See also ==
- B. F. Saul Company, a real estate firm, founded by Bernard Francis Saul
