= Benjamin R. Jacobs =

American biochemist

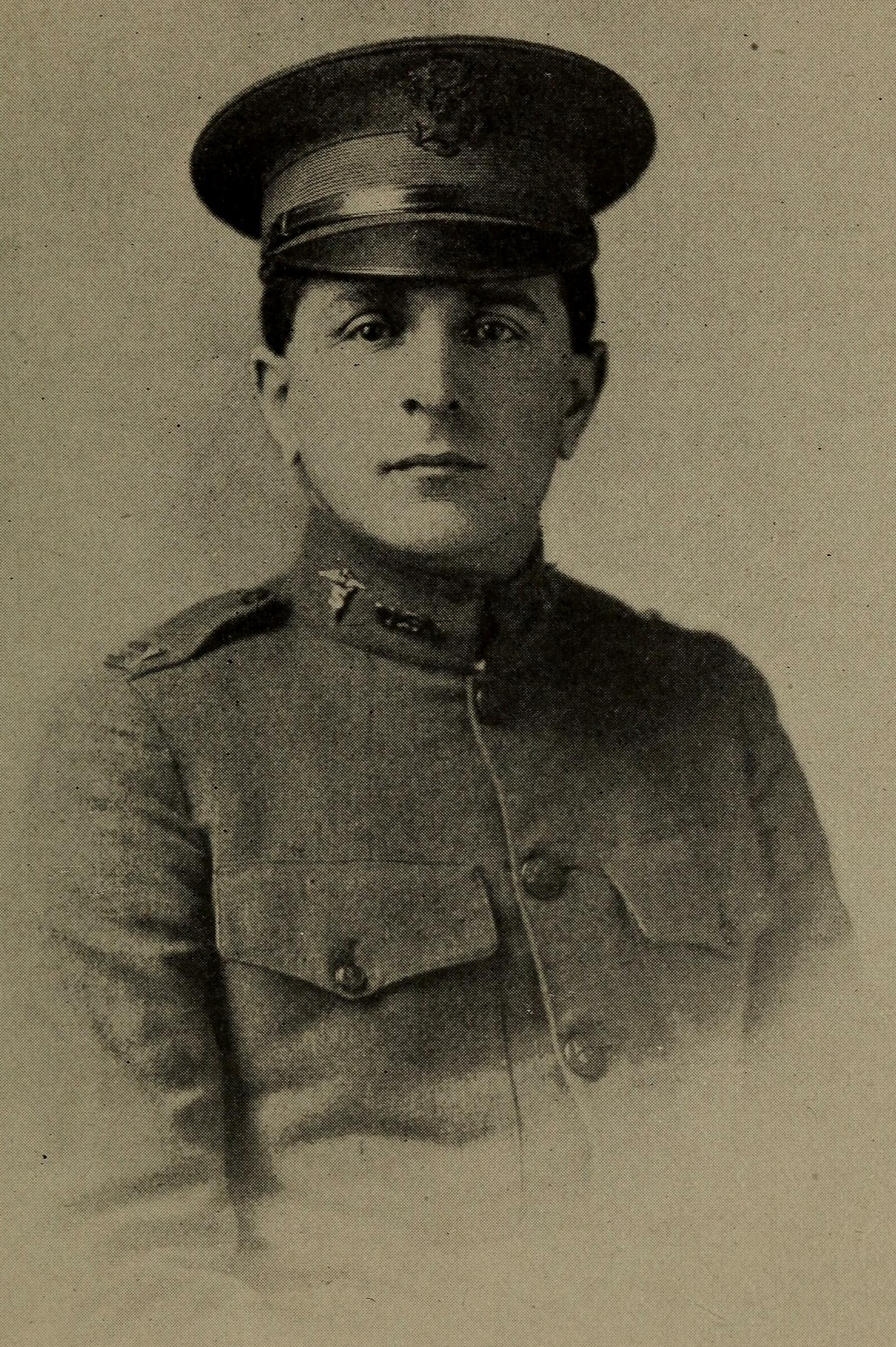
- Photo of Jacobs in a 1920 publication
- Born: Ricardo Benjamin Jacobs; March 15, 1879; Lima, Peru
- Died: February 3, 1963 (aged 83); Orlando, Florida, U.S.
- Occupation: Biochemist
- Known for: Research on nutrition, development of enriched grains

Benjamin Ricardo Jacobs (March 15, 1879 – February 3, 1963) was born at the American Consulate in Lima, Peru, to Rosa Mulet Jacobs of Valparaíso, Chile, a French-Chilean, and Washington Michael Jacobs of South Carolina in the United States. Originally christened on April 5, 1879 as Ricardo Benjamin Jacobs, he later changed his name, once by reversing the order of his first and middle name, and then in some records by anglicizing the name Ricardo to Richard. His mother was the accomplished and well-educated daughter of a noted French merchant in Valparaíso. At the time of his birth, his father was the American vice-consul to Peru. A businessman with many interests in the United States, including mining, his father also was engaged in mining in several countries in South America and he published the Imprenta Americana and a semi-weekly newspaper, El Tumbes.

When the War of the Pacific broke out between Chile and the united forces of Bolivia and Peru, his family moved to Oakland, California, the state where his father had resided previously and retained business interests. They soon moved to Tucson, Arizona Territory. In 1880, his father opened the Jacobs Assay Office (still in operation by his descendants). During the 1880s through the 1890s, Washington M. Jacobs managed varied mining interests, and was elected Justice of the Peace of the Tucson Precinct of Pima County in 1887, serving for two years. Benjamin Jacobs grew up in multi-cultural Tucson and learned the basics of chemistry in his father's assay and chemical laboratory. He also worked in the family mining businesses in Arizona and Mexico, one of which at Ajo, Arizona later became a major copper producer. After his father's death in 1899, Benjamin Jacobs relocated his mother and younger sisters to Oakland, where nearby, he attended and briefly taught chemistry at the University of California, Berkeley.

== Education and major contributions ==
He obtained his Ph.D. in chemistry and concentrated upon what now would be called biochemistry, studying food and nutrition. He developed the process for enrichment of milled grains, cereals, and flours—establishing the standards for the processes and overseeing their application among the producers of the products. Enriched flours of refined grains and cereals now are common in the diets of humans. He also identified the nutritional characteristics of foods eaten in the daily diet of humans, and discovered the chemical processes that were entailed in the transformation of raw materials into foods through preparation and cooking. Providing useful guidelines, he described methods to retain as much of the nutrition in foods as possible during the growing, processing, cooking, and serving of food.

== Professional career ==
Before Jacobs was twenty-seven years old, he had established a successful scientific laboratory in San Francisco and was conducting his own research, when on April 18, 1906, his laboratory was destroyed during the earthquake and the resulting fires that created one of the nation's greatest disasters and destroyed many parts of the city. His equipment and all records of his research were lost.

Relocating to Washington, D.C., Benjamin R. Jacobs joined the federal agency, the Bureau of Chemistry (now the Food and Drug Administration, [FDA]) of the United States Department of Agriculture, with which he had a long association. Some of his work was under the auspices of in the Food Control Laboratory of the department. His first experiments and publication dealt with the adulteration of flour and the enforcement of stricter controls on industry under the 1906 Pure Food and Drug Act. He also worked with one of the first women chemists in the department, Hannah L. Wessling.

During this time with the government he also participated in the Distribution Division of the United States Food Administration, which was formed to deal with daunting issues regarding food distribution during World War I. He participated for a great portion of the time of the existence of the division, through to the withdrawal of the principal license regulations. He traveled the country and into Canada as an investigator for Herbert C. Hoover's Federal Food Administration.

In 1917 a federal war-time food control act was passed when crop failures in Europe laid the burden of feeding the populations of both continents, the British Isles, and the armies of the allies—upon the United States. This effort intervened in the supply and demand process that always had functioned in the marketplace for food, both in the supply process and in the profits taken, to assure that both civilians and the armed forces had enough food to survive the famine that was threatening to develop, even establishing a rationing system and the control of prices.

Two draft registration cards for him are presented on ancestry.com, where he lists his name as Benjamin Richard Jacobs. The first is dated September 12, 1918 for World War I and the second is for World War II, but it bears no date.

Among the personal notes about members of what is now the American Chemical Society, in the November 1920 issue of the Journal of Industrial and Engineering Chemistry, is an announcement that Jacobs was leaving the federal government. He re-established his own laboratories, the National Cereal Products Laboratory, with facilities in Washington, D.C. and Manhattan. The address of the Manhattan facility is listed on his WWII draft registration as 156 Chambers Street. He remained as a consultant, however, to the Bureau of Chemistry throughout his lifetime. Jacobs also was retained throughout the rest of his life by C.F. Mueller Company to oversee the nutritional enrichment of their macaroni, noodles, and pasta products as they developed the nationally distributed brand that is still a recognized leader in the food industry.

Benjamin R. Jacobs was a member of the American Chemical Society and the American Association for the Advancement of Science, who often presented reports about his research before their members in national and regional meetings and he was a frequent contributor to their scientific journals, Science and the Journal of the American Chemical Society. His research also was reported in other scientific publications of the day, such as the American Food Journal, and he served as the president of the National Noodle and Macaroni Association of America.

== Personal information ==
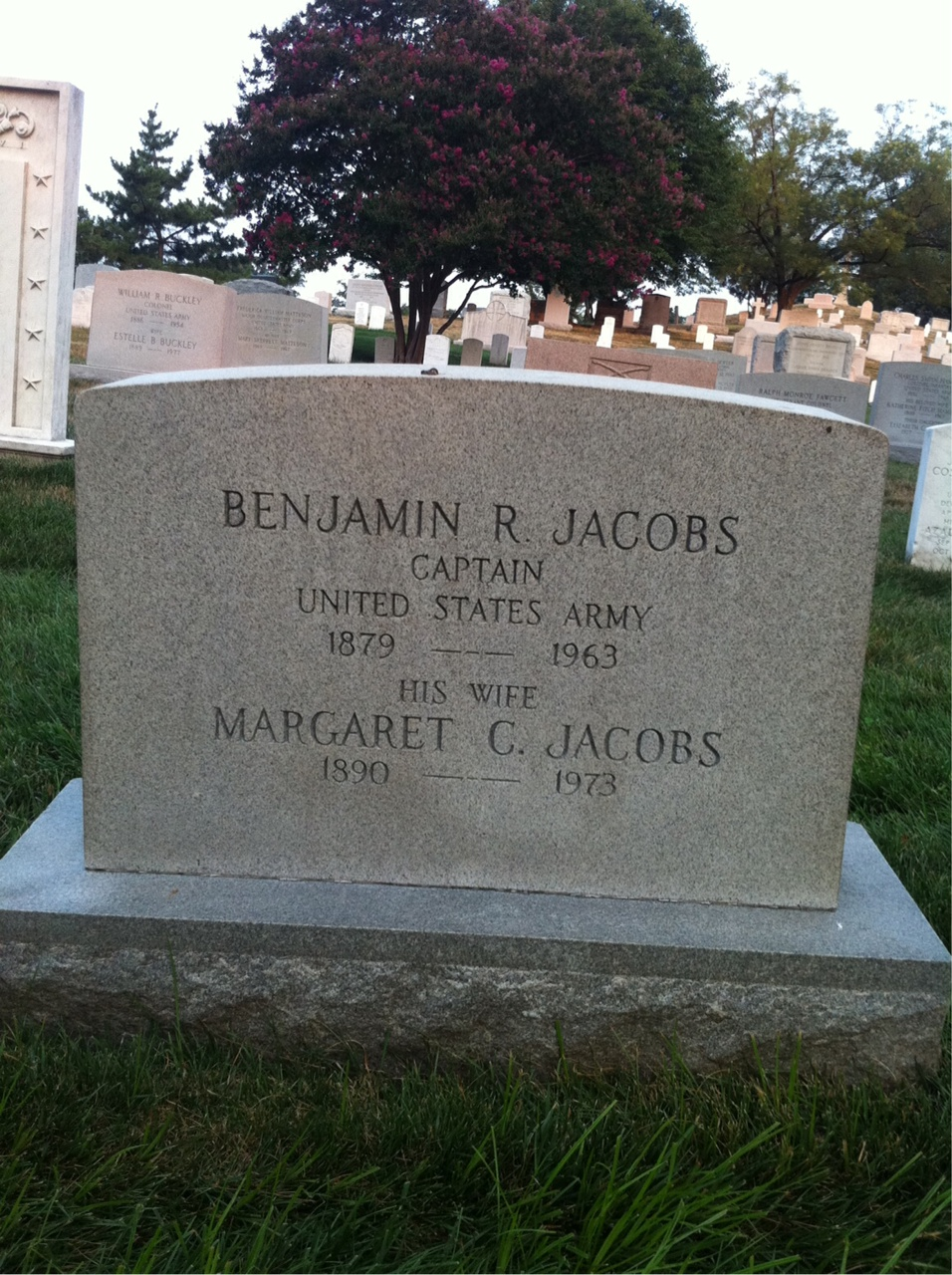
Gravestone of Benjamin R. Jacobs and Margaret Connell Jacobs at Arlington National Cemetery

His daughters, Irene (born 1905) and Millicent (born 1907), were born to his first wife, Sarah, who died when the children were young. After raising his daughters as a single father, he married Margaret Ann Connell of Washington, D.C., who was assistant to Samuel Gompers, the founder of the American Federation of Labor. In order to have his new wife travel worldwide with him as he did for enjoyment as well as for his professional activities, according to her niece, Marie Connell, he wanted Margaret to resign her work. Reluctant to give up her professional career, she required that he would have to pay her salary, with annual increases, for the rest of her life—totally above any household or joint expenses. They maintained residences at the historic landmark, the Kennedy-Warren in Washington, D.C., in the historic College Park section of Orlando, Florida, in Essex Fells in New Jersey, and in Kennebunkport, Maine.

At the age of eighty-three, Jacobs died in Orlando, Florida. Following services at Gawler's Funeral Home in Washington, D.C., he was buried at Arlington National Cemetery and was honored as a veteran with his rank being identified as, captain. His wife, Margaret Connell Jacobs, was buried with him a decade later in 1973, also dying at the age of eighty-three.

== See also ==
- Refined grains
- Enriched flour
