= 2101 Connecticut Avenue =

- U.S. Historic district – Contributing property
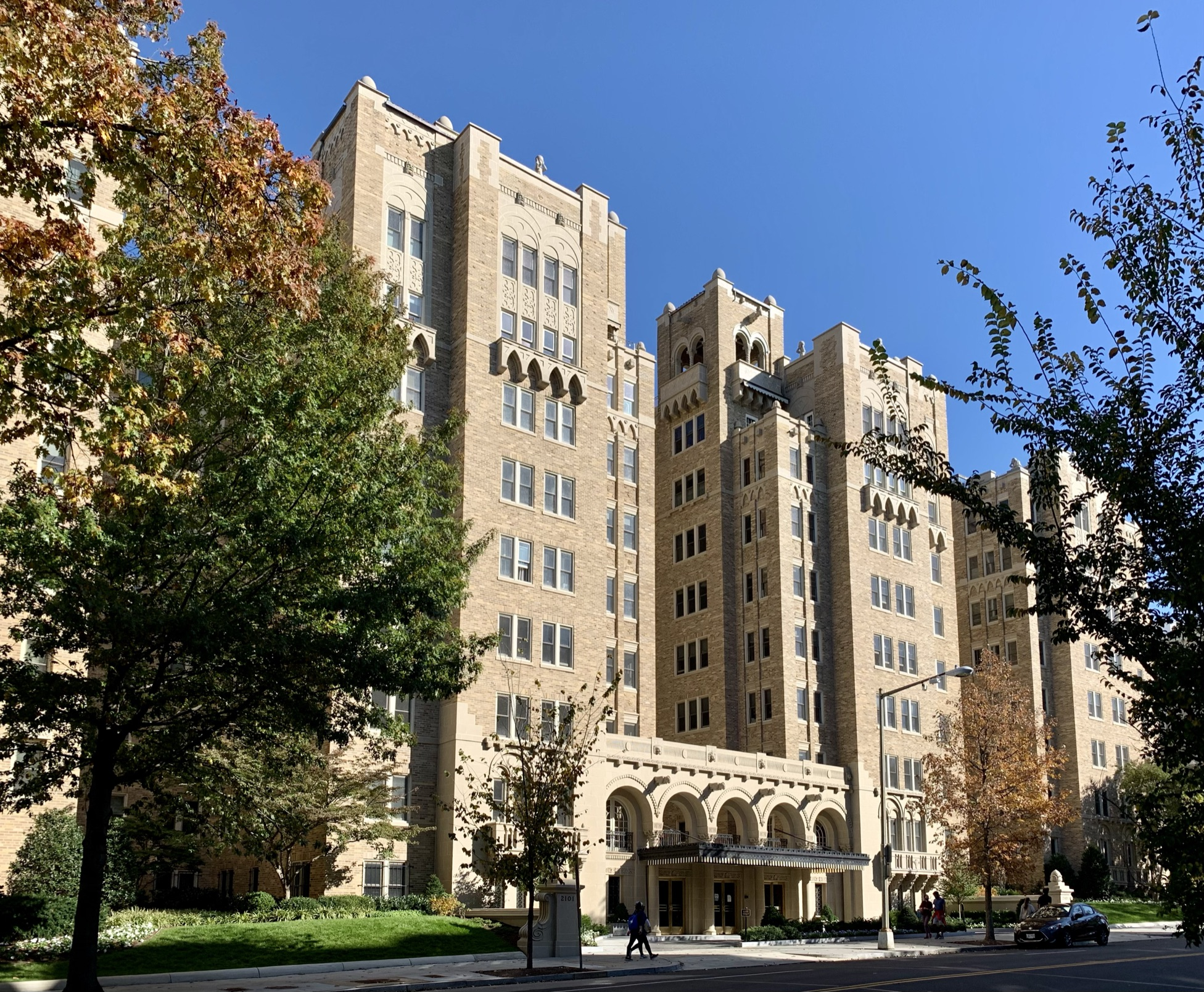
- Location: 2101 Connecticut Avenue NW; Washington, D.C., USA
- Coordinates: 38.918481°N 77.047675°W
- Built: 1928
- Architect: George T. Santmyers, Joseph Abel
- Part of: Kalorama Triangle Historic District

2101 Connecticut Avenue is a housing co-op and former apartment building sited on a prominent place in the Kalorama Triangle Historic District in Washington, D.C. The neighborhood where the building stands was mostly developed in the 1890s to early 20th-century. Many large apartment buildings had already been built in the area by the time 2101 Connecticut Avenue was constructed in 1928. It was the last of the grand and luxurious apartment buildings constructed in Kalorama Triangle. The architects for the building were George T. Santmyers and Joseph Abel, the latter doing most of the work.

The real estate project was developed by Harry M. Bralove and two business partners. Several houses were demolished to make way for the building. Although most of the neighborhood's housing was developed for the middle-class, 2101 Connecticut Avenue catered to the upper-class or higher middle-class. The building remained an apartment house until 1976 when it was converted into a co-op. It underwent a year-long renovation at the same time. The building was designated a contributing property to the Kalorama Triangle Historic District, listed on the National Register of Historic Places and District of Columbia Inventory of Historic Sites in 1987. Historian and author James Moore Goode considered 2100 Connecticut Avenue the most beautiful and grandest apartment building constructed in the city between World War I and World War II.

The eclectic design of 2100 Connecticut Avenue is a mixture of Moorish Revival, Spanish Colonial, and Gothic Revival architectures. The building is eight stories and contains 64 units. It is shaped like a double 'H' (H-H), which allows each unit to have windows on three sides. In addition to parrot gargoyles above the entrance and lion heads in the frieze, a prominent architectural feature are the sixteen grotesques of demons carrying stone balls as if to throw them. They are located on top of the building.

Each unit measures 2,600 square feet (240 m^{2}) to 3,200 square feet (300 m^{2}) and includes three bedrooms, a large gallery, sunporch, and other features. The price of a unit is expensive, with one selling in 2022 for almost $2 million, not including the co-op fee of $4,407 per month. Prominent residents who have lived in 2101 Connecticut Avenue include a vice president, multiple senators and representatives, military officials, judges, and diplomats.

== History ==
=== Development ===
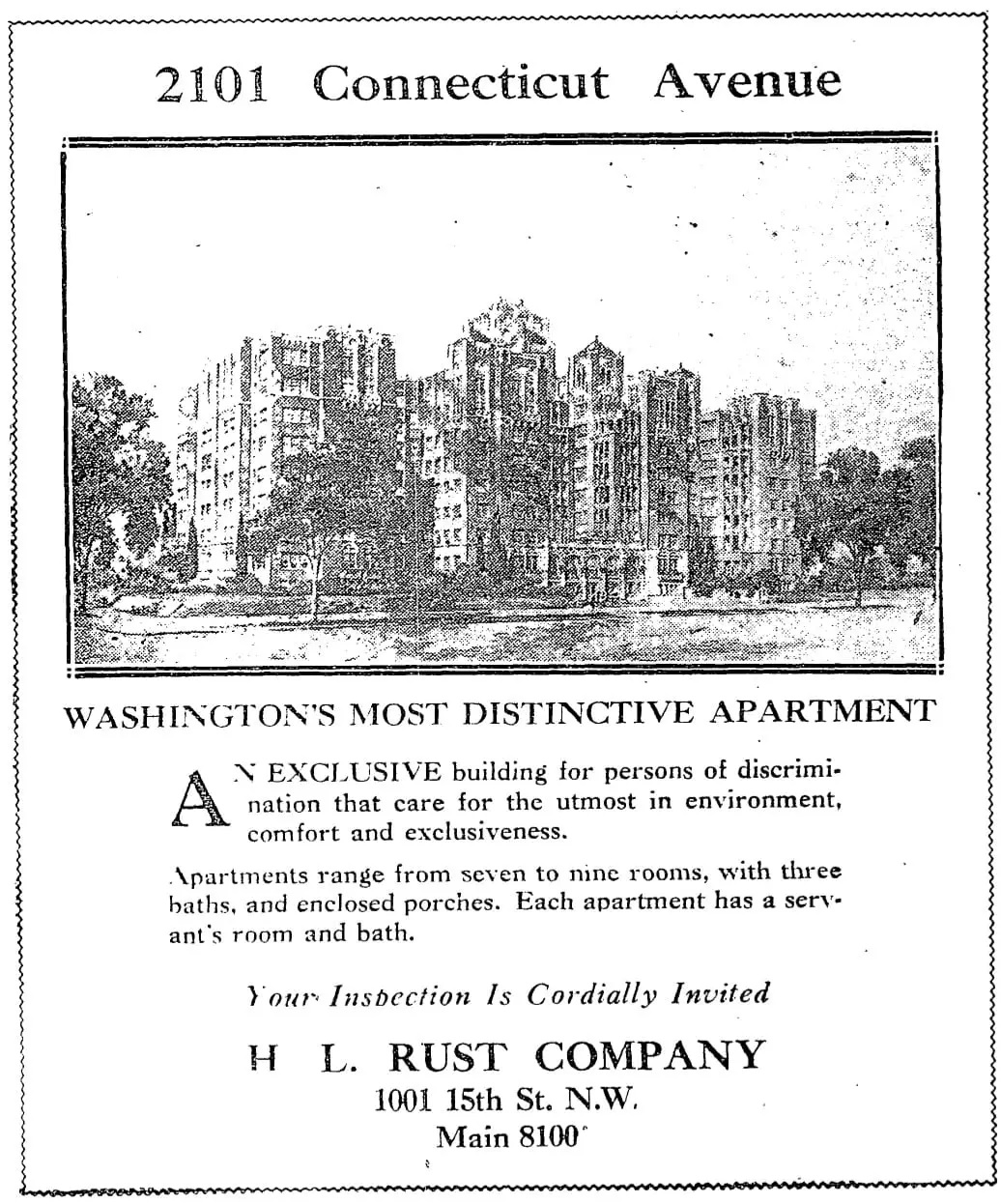
A 1928 newspaper ad for 2101 Connecticut Avenue

Kalorama Triangle is a residential neighborhood bordered by Connecticut Avenue, Columbia Road, and Rock Creek Park. For many years the area was considered a suburb of Washington, D.C., due to it being north of Boundary Street (Florida Avenue). Although there were some large homes built in the neighborhood, for the most part it was devoid of residential properties. After the District of Columbia Organic Act of 1871 extended the boundaries of the city, development did not occur right away. Beginning in the 1890s, rapid development of the neighborhood began after Connecticut Avenue and Columbia Road were extended and streetcar lines were installed. Despite the rapid real estate development, some of the older homes first built in the neighborhood were still standing. All of these would eventually be torn down to make way for rowhouses and large, ornate apartment buildings.

Large apartment buildings were constructed in Kalorama Triangle, most of them along Connecticut Avenue and Columbia Road, with the first one being The Woodward, built in 1910. Several of the houses built in the 1880s and 1890s were demolished for the neighborhood's last grand apartment building. To make way for 2101 Connecticut Avenue, residences including Samuel Walter Woodward's Georgian Revival house that was designed by James G. Hill were demolished. The location of a new apartment building on the stretch of Connecticut Avenue was in line with earlier large apartment buildings, including 2029 Connecticut Avenue, The Woodward, and The Dresden, which is across the street from 2101 Connecticut Avenue, in the Sheridan-Kalorama Historic District.

The $1-2 million building project was a development by Harry M. Bralove, along with his business partners, Edward C. Ernst and John J. McInerney. The building, which fronts on Connecticut Avenue between Kalorama Road and Wyoming Avenue, was called by historian James Moore Goode the most beautiful and grandest built in the city between World War I and World War II. The architects who designed the building were George T. Santmyers and Joseph Abel. The latter did most of the architectural design as an apprentice in Santmyers' office. Additional apartment buildings Abel designed are the 2100 Connecticut Avenue Apartments, the Shoreham Hotel, 2500 Calvert Street, and The Broadmoor. The construction permit for 2101 Connecticut Avenue was issued on November 2, 1927, (D.C. Building Permit #3831) for Lot 0300, Square 2537.

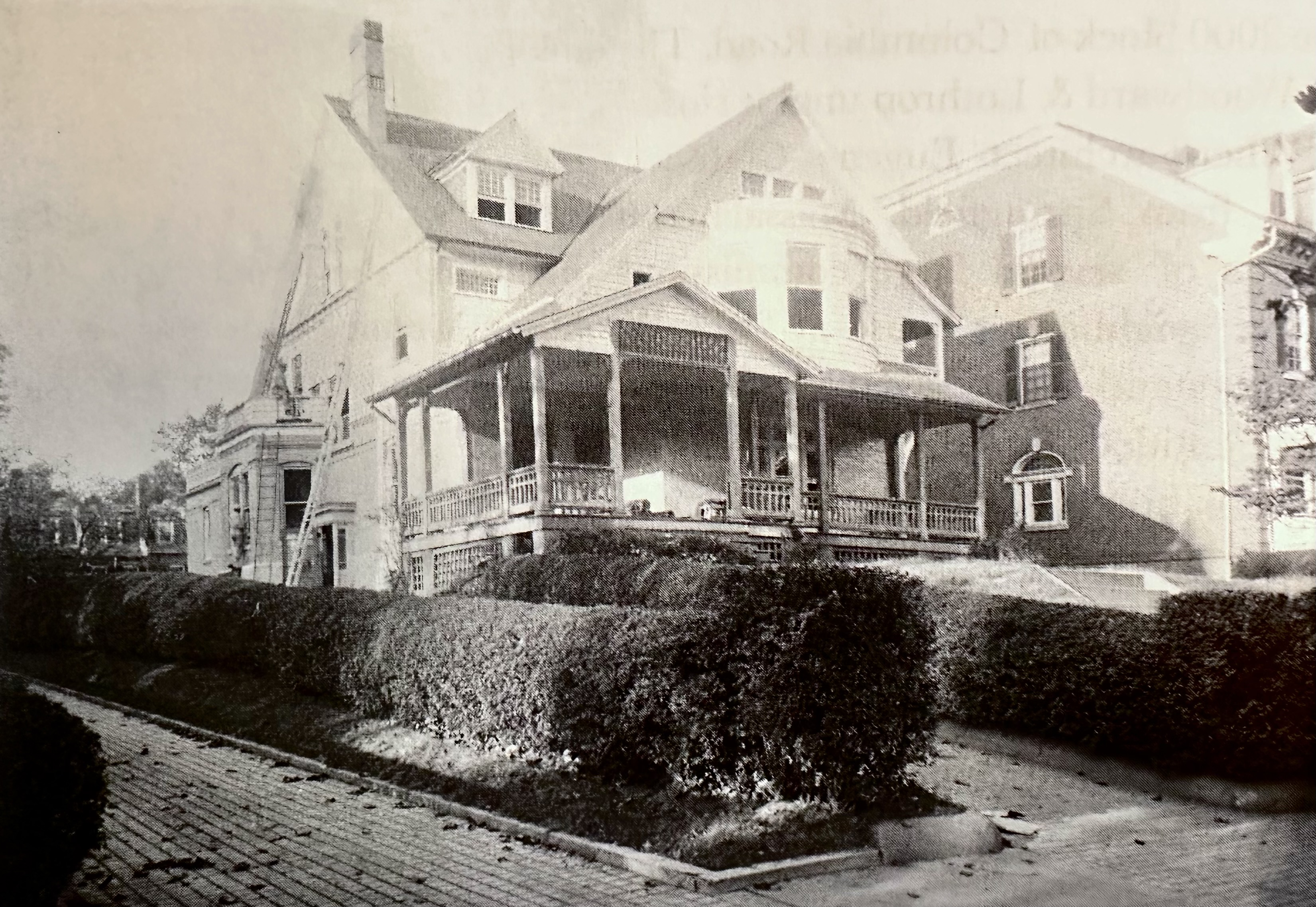
The Eliza Barker House was demolished to make way for a two-story parking garage.

Advertisements for the building began appearing in local newspapers in 1928, which clearly demonstrated the luxury potential renters would experience living there. Its convenience to streetcars, prominent location, and nearby luxurious apartment buildings, were also a draw to renters. Although select buildings catered to the upper class or higher-middle class, the neighborhood contained many rowhouses and smaller apartment buildings that were homes to those in the middle class. Prices were either $2,100 a year or $3,750 to $5,000, depending on the source. The building opened for renters on October 1, 1928.

In 1954, the Queen Anne style Eliza Barker House located at 2011 Wyoming Avenue was demolished and replaced with a two-level parking garage containing 68 spaces for 2101 Connecticut Avenue residents. The house had been built in 1886 and designed by Eugene C. Gardner. Two prominent past occupants of the house were Representative Wallace H. White and the Serbian legation. In 1976, the apartment building was converted into a housing cooperative (co-op) by B. F. Saul Company. Extensive renovations took place including a new roof, new kitchens, and central air cooling. Students from the Corcoran Gallery of Art restored the lobby. During the year-long renovation and conversion, around half the renters chose to purchase their apartments for $70,000 to $100,000, a somewhat low cost of a luxury apartment at the time. The original terrace is still functional, and decorated with wrought-iron furniture, flower barrels, walkways, and the two pavilions.

The building is a contributing property to the Kalorama Triangle Historic District, a historic district added to the District of Columbia Inventory of Historic Sites on April 27, 1987, and the National Register of Historic Places on May 4, 1987. The price for a co-op apartment is based on size and floor level. An example in 2022 was a unit on the second floor selling for almost $2 million, in addition to the co-op fee of $4,407 per month.

=== Design ===
==== Exterior ====
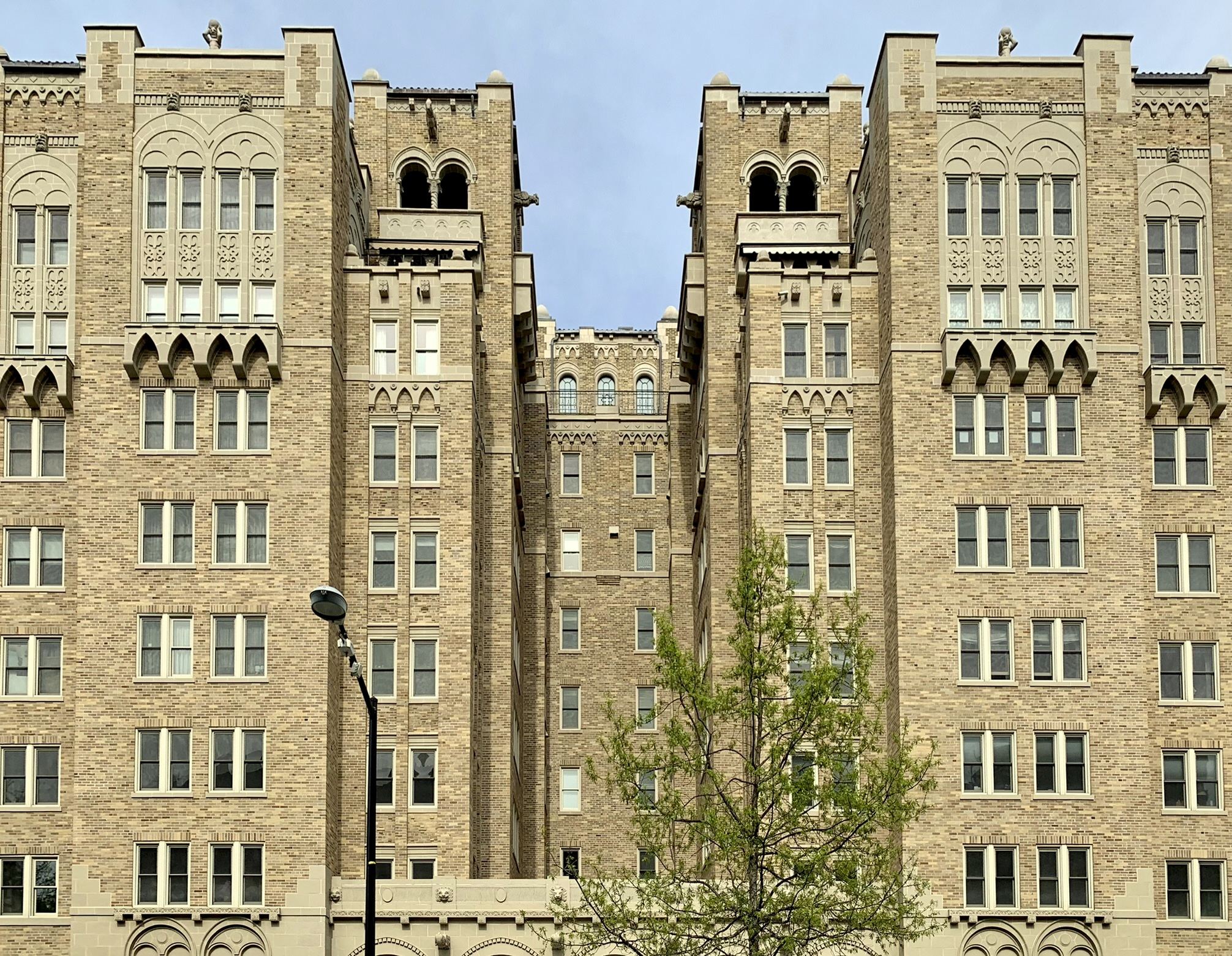
Two of the sixteen grotesques of demons along the rooftop

The driveway is semicircular and features decorative limestone piers. The entrance features five arches, with the three entrance doors aligned with the three middle arches. Above the entranceway arches are four parrot gargoyles. The step-down lobby includes 16 feet (4.9 m) ceilings, meeting rooms, a reception desk, and twelve steel beams covered in mahogany. The center of the lobby features a recessed dome and crystal chandelier.

2101 Connecticut Avenue is eight-stories tall, three bays wide, and is in the shape of a double 'H' (H-H). The dimensions of the building are 264 feet (80 m) long and 127 feet (39 m) wide. The eclectic design is a mixture of Moorish Revival, Spanish Colonial, and Gothic Revival architectures. Architectural terracotta is on the façade of the building's top two floors. In addition to the two pavilions on the roof, a feature on top of the building is a collection of sixteen grotesques of demons, each one measuring 5 feet (1.5 m) tall, and holding stone balls as if they might hurl them at pedestrians. According to Goode, they were "designed as horned grinning demons, each holds a massive ball over his head — 'threatening' to toss down a stone boulder on intruders to protect the fortunate residents within." The grotesques were removed in 1994 for restoration and returned later that year. In the frieze are six lion heads.

==== Interior ====
There were originally 514 rooms in the 64-unit building, but some of the layouts have been altered. Each apartment contains three bedrooms and due to the 'HH' design of the building, three sides of each unit has windows. The size of each unit, which only includes one per wing, is between 2,600 square feet (240 m^{2}) and 3,200 square feet (300 m^{2}). The apartments were designed to allow residents to entertain large groups.

As one enters a unit, there is a long gallery, with most of the rooms connected to it. Most of the units have the three bedrooms on one side of the gallery, and the remaining rooms on the other. In addition to the large bedrooms and entertaining space, there is a kitchen, pantry, a maid's room and adjoining bathroom, and a sunporch. The ceiling in each unit is approximately 9 feet (2.7 m) tall. When Goode wrote his book, Best Addresses in 1988, there had only been two apartments altered in size; Apt 87 was expanded via a room from Apt 88 and the same thing occurred with Apt 72 and Apt 71. There are fireplaces in most of the units on the top three floors.

=== Notable residents ===
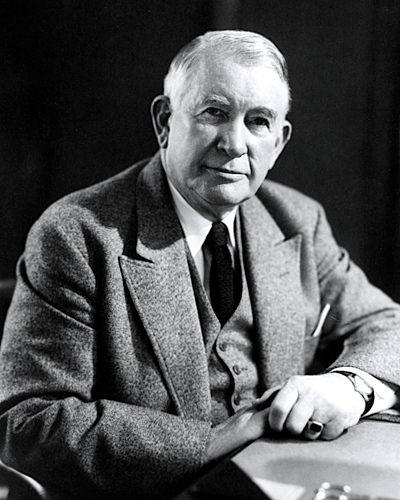
Vice President Alben W. Barkley is a previous resident.

The building has been home to many prominent residents, including politicians and high-ranking military officials, throughout its history. A partial list of past residents include:

- Alben W. Barkley, Vice President during President Harry S. Truman's tenure
- Second Lady of the United States Jane Hadley Barkley
- Tom C. Clark, Associate Justice of the U.S. Supreme Court
- Willis Van Devanter, Associate Justice of the U.S. Supreme Court
- Benjamin N. Cardozo, Associate Justice of the U.S. Supreme Court
- Admiral John S. McCain Jr., father of Senator John McCain
- Roberta McCain, socialite and mother of Senator McCain
- Lieutenant General Leslie Groves, director of the Manhattan Project
- Douglas MacArthur II, diplomat and nephew of General Douglas MacArthur
- Lieutenant General William Wilson Quinn
- U.S. Admiral Arthur L. Willard
- Major General Howard McCrum Snyder, Physician to the President for Dwight D. Eisenhower
- U.S. Senator J. William Fulbright
- U.S. Senator William Borah
- U.S. Senator Theodore E. Burton
- U.S. Senator Eugene Millikin
- U.S. Representative Howard M. Baldrige
- U.S. Representative William S. Mailliard
- U.S. Representative J. Harry Covington, federal judge
- U.S. Representative Charles F. McLaughlin, federal judge
- U.S. Federal Court of Appeals Chief Judge Patricia Wald
- Dominican Republic legation
- U. Alexis Johnson, diplomat
- Admiral Alberto Lais, Italian diplomat
- Donald F. Turner, attorney, economist, and educator
- John Kluge, entrepreneur

== See also ==
- National Register of Historic Places listings in Washington, D.C.

== Notes ==
1. Sources differ on the total building cost.
