= Chevy Chase Bank =

Defunct American banking company

Chevy Chase Bank, F.S.B.

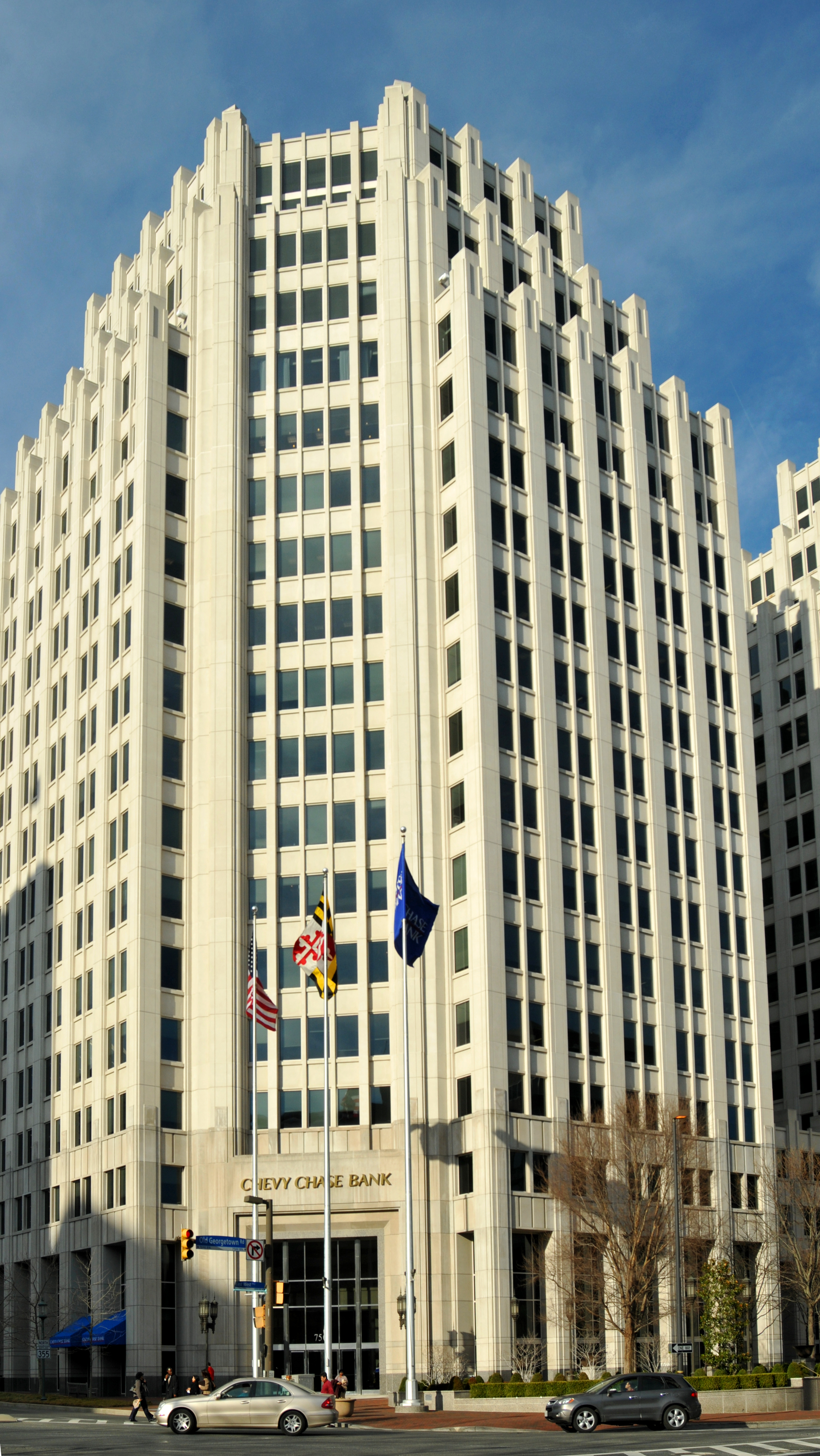
- Chevy Chase Bank headquarters in 2008
- Type: Private
- Founded: 1955; 71 years ago
- Founder: B. F. Saul II
- Defunct: September 10, 2010; 16 years ago
- Fate: Acquired by Capital One
- Successor: Capital One (known as Capital One Bank)
- Headquarters: Bethesda, Maryland, United States
- Number of locations: 292 (Jun. 30, 2008)
- Area served: Washington Metropolitan Area
- Total assets: $18.3 billion (Mar. 31, 2009)
- Number of employees: 4,381 (Dec. 31, 2007)
- Website: www.chevychasebank.com

Chevy Chase Bank, F.S.B. was the largest locally based banking company in the Washington Metropolitan Area. It was acquired by Capital One in February 2009, and rebranded as Capital One Bank in September 2010. Despite its name, Chevy Chase Bank was a federally chartered thrift regulated by the Office of Thrift Supervision, rather than a bank.

It was formerly held and controlled by the B. F. Saul Real Estate Investment Trust; B. Francis Saul II, who founded the REIT and is the grandson of the founder of the B. F. Saul Company, served as its chairman.

== History ==
The bank traces its history to 1892, when Bernard Francis Saul founded the B.F. Saul Company, a mortgage and real estate firm. On October 11, 1955, a savings and loan charter was granted to a group of Baltimore area businessmen but never used. In 1969, the charter was purchased and the Chevy Chase Savings And Loan Association was established, taking the name from Chevy Chase, Maryland.

Saul's grandson, B. Francis Saul II, opened the S&L on December 1, 1969, fifty years to the day after his grandfather, B. F. Saul opened Home Savings and Loan (subsequently merged into American Security Bank – now part of Bank of America). It became an FDIC insured federal savings bank in 1985 and changed its name to Chevy Chase Savings Bank, F.S.B. accordingly the following year.

It acquired the Standard Savings and Loan Association of Grundy, Virginia, in 1988.

It adopted its most recent name in 1994, and on January 16, 1996, moved its registration from Chevy Chase to McLean. It moved into its actual headquarters in Bethesda in 2001. In 1995, it acquired the historic Alex. Brown & Sons Building in Baltimore, Maryland, which was renovated the following year and used for a branch office.

On December 4, 2008, Capital One announced it would be acquiring Chevy Chase Bank. The acquisition was completed on February 27, 2009. Capital One rebranded Chevy Chase Bank's roughly 240 branches over a weekend in September 2010, and they reopened as Capital One Bank on Monday, September 13, 2010.

== Business structure ==
The bank's core business was residential mortgages and consumer banking; its mortgage subsidiary, the B.F. Saul Mortgage Company, was one of the leading mortgage originators in the region. As of December 31, 2007, it held $14.0 billion in deposits. Chevy Chase Bank had more than 290 branches in Delaware, Maryland, Virginia, and the District of Columbia, and claimed to have the largest network of ATMs in the Washington area.

According to ABA routing information it was based in Laurel, Maryland, while the bank's headquarters offices were in downtown Bethesda, Maryland, at the corner of Wisconsin Avenue and East-West Highway. According to its FDIC certificate, the firm was headquartered in McLean, Virginia. This was before being acquired by McLean based Capital One, not after.

== Competition ==
Its main competitors were the retail banking divisions of larger, supraregional companies such as Bank of America, BB&T, SunTrust Banks, and Wachovia, and so emphasized its local nature and community involvement in its advertising. The bank used a caricature portrayal of Benjamin Franklin as its advertising mascot, who repeated the tagline The Leading Local Bank in its television commercials.

== Litigation ==
Chevy Chase Bank was the subject of two national class action lawsuits for violations of the Truth in Lending Act of 1968 involving as many as 7,000 mortgage borrowers. A federal district court ruled against the bank in January 2007, but the ruling was stayed pending appeal to the U.S. 7th Circuit Court of Appeals. The Seventh Circuit Court of Appeals overturned the federal district ruling in September, 2008.

The bank also agreed to pay $16 million to settle a class action alleging it charged late fees and high interest rates to credit card holders, although it denied wrongdoing.
