= Provident Bank =

Provident Bank may refer to:

- Provident Bank of Maryland
- Provident Bank of New Jersey

== See also ==
- Provident Bank Park, former name of Clover Stadium, a stadium in Pomona, New York
- Provident National Bank, a predecessor of PNC Financial Services
