= John Saul (disambiguation) =

John Saul is an American author.

John Saul may also refer to:

- John Hennessy Saul (1819–1897), Irish-born American horticulturist and landscape architect
- John L. Saul (born 1948), British novelist and short story writer
- John Ralston Saul (born 1947), Canadian philosopher
- John S. Saul (John Shannon Saul) (1938-2023), Canadian political economist and activist
- John Saul (prostitute), male prostitute in the Cleveland Street scandal
- John Saul (actor) (1913–1979), Australian actor and director
