= James Moore Goode =

American architectural historian (1939–2019)

- Born: September 17, 1939; Statesville, North Carolina, U.S.
- Died: December 12, 2019 (aged 80); Washington, D.C., U.S.
- Education: University of South Carolina (BA); University of Virginia (MA); George Washington University (PhD)
- Occupations: Historian; writer

James Moore Goode (September 17, 1939 – December 12, 2019) was a historian based in Washington, D.C. He wrote a number of books about the history of architecture and statues in Washington, D.C.

== Early life ==
James Moore Goode was born on September 17, 1939, in Statesville, North Carolina. His father was a corporate treasurer. He graduated with a Bachelor of Arts from the University of South Carolina in 1964 and a Master of Arts in history from the University of Virginia in 1966. His unpublished master's thesis was titled "The Debating Societies Maintaining the Great Patronage of the Student Bodies." He later attended George Washington University to earn a PhD in American Studies in 1995, with a dissertation on Thomas Ustick Walter under the direction of Richard W. Longstreth.

== Career ==
After graduating in 1966, Goode came to Washington, D.C. to teach at George Mason University. From 1968 to 1970, Goode worked for two years in the Prints and Photographs Division of the Library of Congress as a reference librarian. In 1970, Goode was hired by Richard Howland to manage architectural records at the Smithsonian Institution. In 1971, Goode was appointed as curator of the Smithsonian Institution and held that role for 16 years. He resigned in 1988 to attend George Washington University. After completing his PhD in 1995, Goode became the curator of the archives of the B. F. Saul Company. He worked as a curator of the Washingtoniana collections of Albert H. Small that were gifted to George Washington University.

Starting with his work at the Smithsonian, Goode wrote a number of books about the history of architecture and statues in Washington, D.C. In 1974, Goode wrote The Outdoor Sculpture of Washington, D.C. (later expanded and renamed Washington Sculpture: A Cultural History of Outdoor Sculpture in the Nation's Capital, released in 2008). Goode then published Capital Losses: A Cultural History of Washington's Destroyed Buildings in 1979 and Best Addresses: One Hundred Years of Washington's Distinguished Apartment Homes in 1988. In 2012, Goode wrote Capital Views, a book assembling rare photograph of Washington, D.C. In 2015, Goode wrote The Evolution of Washington, D.C., which included images from Albert Small's Washingtoniana collection. Capital Houses of Washington, D.C. and Environs 1735–1965 appeared in 2015. The photo archives for The Outdoor Sculpture of Washington, D.C., Best Addresses, Washington Sculpture, and Capital Houses are held in the Department of Image Collections at the National Gallery of Art.

== Personal life ==
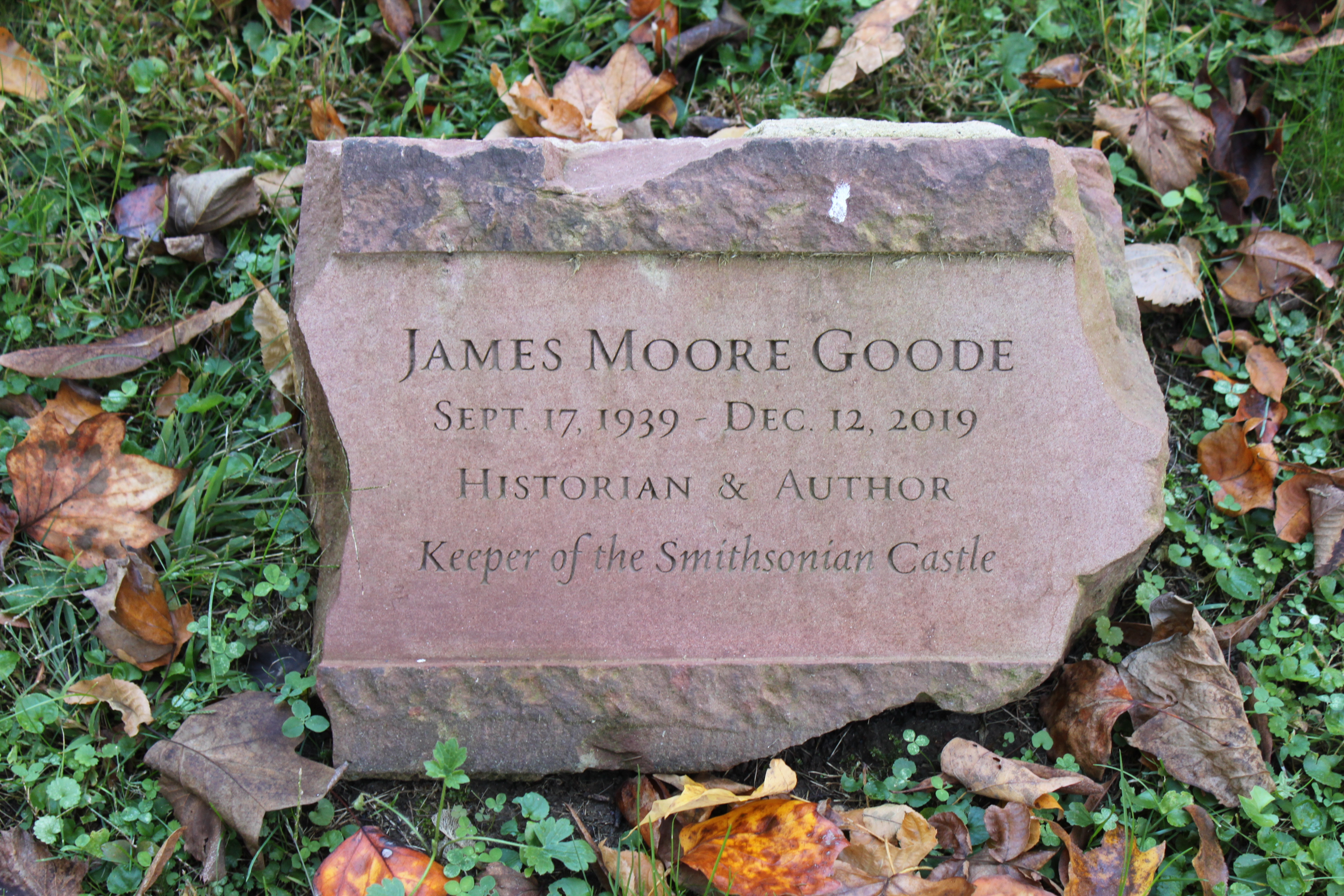
Grave of Goode at Oak Hill Cemetery

Goode died at a hospital in Washington, D.C., on December 12, 2019.

== Awards and legacy ==
In 2006, Goode donated a collection of photographs to the Thomas Balch Library from the 18th and 19th centuries.

In 2015, Goode was awarded the Visionary Historian Award from the Historical Society of Washington, D.C.

In 2017, Goode was awarded the District of Columbia's Lifetime Achievement Award in Historic Preservation.
