= So Glad I'm Me =

Studio album by LaKisha Jones
- Released: May 19, 2009
- Genre: R&B, soul, inspirational
- Label: Elite Music LLC

LaKisha Jones chronology
| LaKisha Jones (EP) (2007) | So Glad I'm Me (2009) |

So Glad I'm Me is the debut album by American Idol contestant LaKisha Jones, released on May 19, 2009. The first single, "So Glad I'm Me," was released to iTunes in November 2008. The album sold around 7,000 copies in 2009. It reached #47 on Billboard's Top R&B/Hip-Hop Albums chart.

A fan book, signed by fans on her Myspace, was released with the CD.

== Track listing ==
1. "Grateful"
2. "So Glad I'm Me"
3. "Beautiful Girl"
4. "Same Song"
5. "Let's Go Celebrate"
6. "Ain't Worth It"
7. "Nothing"
8. "Be Alright"
9. "You Give Good Love"
10. "Free" (feat. Mike Winans)
11. "Memories (Fade Away)"
12. "Just As I Am"

=== Bonus tracks ===
1. "Bye Bye" - Walmart Bonus Track
2. "So Glad I'm Me" (Black Pearl Club Mix) - Walmart Bonus Track, iTunes Bonus Track
3. "Picked the Right Time" - Target Bonus Track
4. "Let's Go Celebrate (Remix)"- Target Bonus Track
5. "Let's Go Celebrate" (Jody Den Broeder Remix) - iTunes Bonus Track
6. "Let's Go Celebrate" (Friscia and Lamboy Remix) - iTunes Bonus Track

== Critical reception ==
All Music Guide praised the album and Jones' voice in particular. A MLive critic also praised Jones' vocals but criticized the tracks themselves as derivative and "little more than warmed-over Kanye West outtakes."
