= 3901 Connecticut Avenue NW =

- U.S. National Register of Historic Places
- D.C. Inventory of Historic Sites
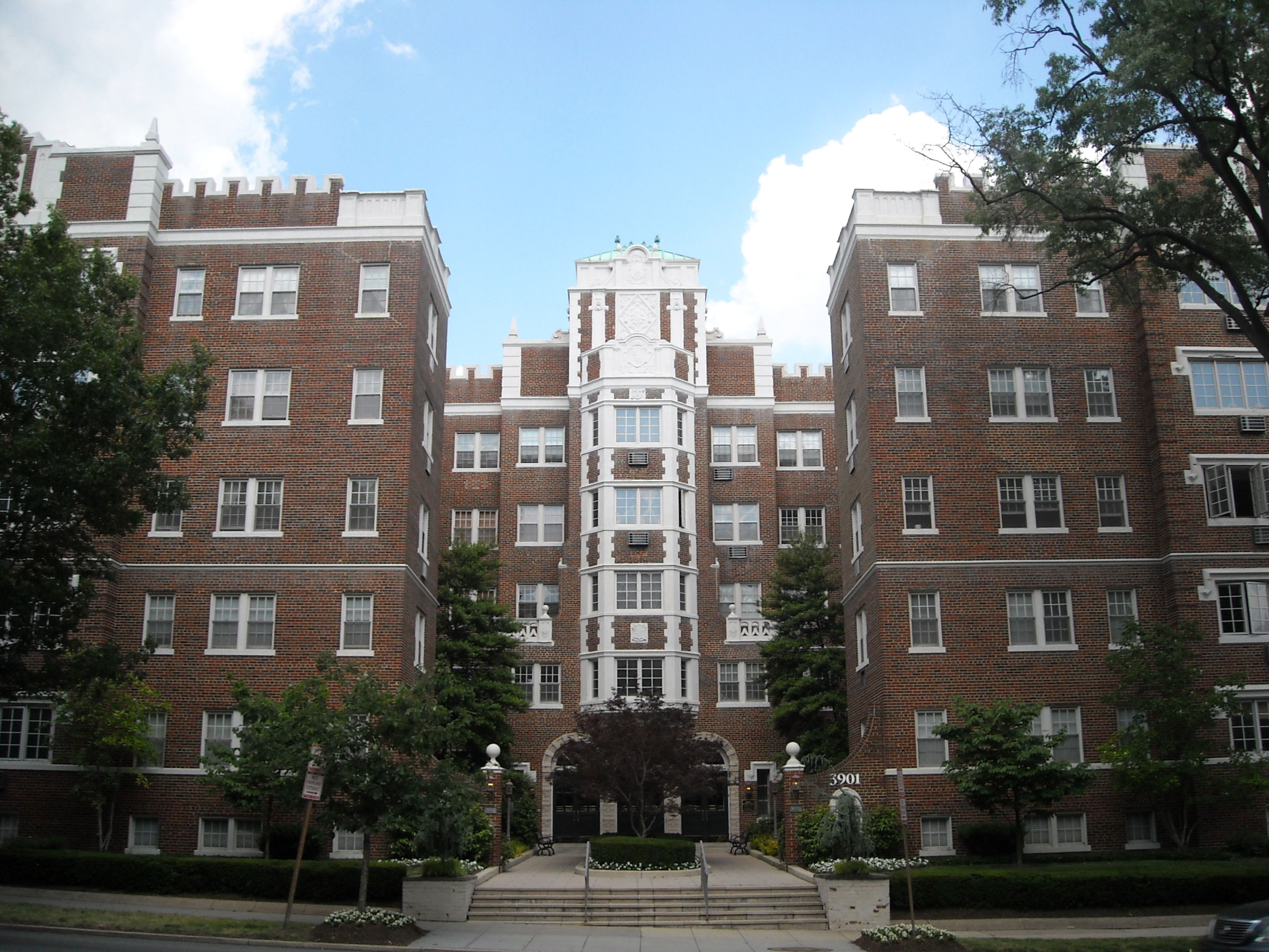

- Location within District of Columbia
- Location: Washington, D.C.
- Coordinates: 38°56′24″N 77°3′38″W
- Built: 1927
- Architect: George T. Santmyers
- Architectural style: Tudor Revival
- MPS: Apartment Buildings in Washington, DC, MPS
- NRHP reference No.: 97001117

Significant dates
- Added to NRHP: September 11, 1997
- Designated DCIHS: March 28, 1996

3901 Connecticut Avenue NW is a six-story Tudor Revival apartment building in the North Cleveland Park (also known as Van Ness) neighborhood of Washington, D.C. Designed by architect George T. Santmyers, 3901 Connecticut Avenue was built in 1927 for developer Harry Bralove. The building was added to the District of Columbia Inventory of Historic Sites on March 28, 1996, and listed on the National Register of Historic Places on September 11, 1997.

== See also ==
- National Register of Historic Places listings in Washington, D.C.
