= Refined grains =

Cereal containing endosperm, but not bran nor germ

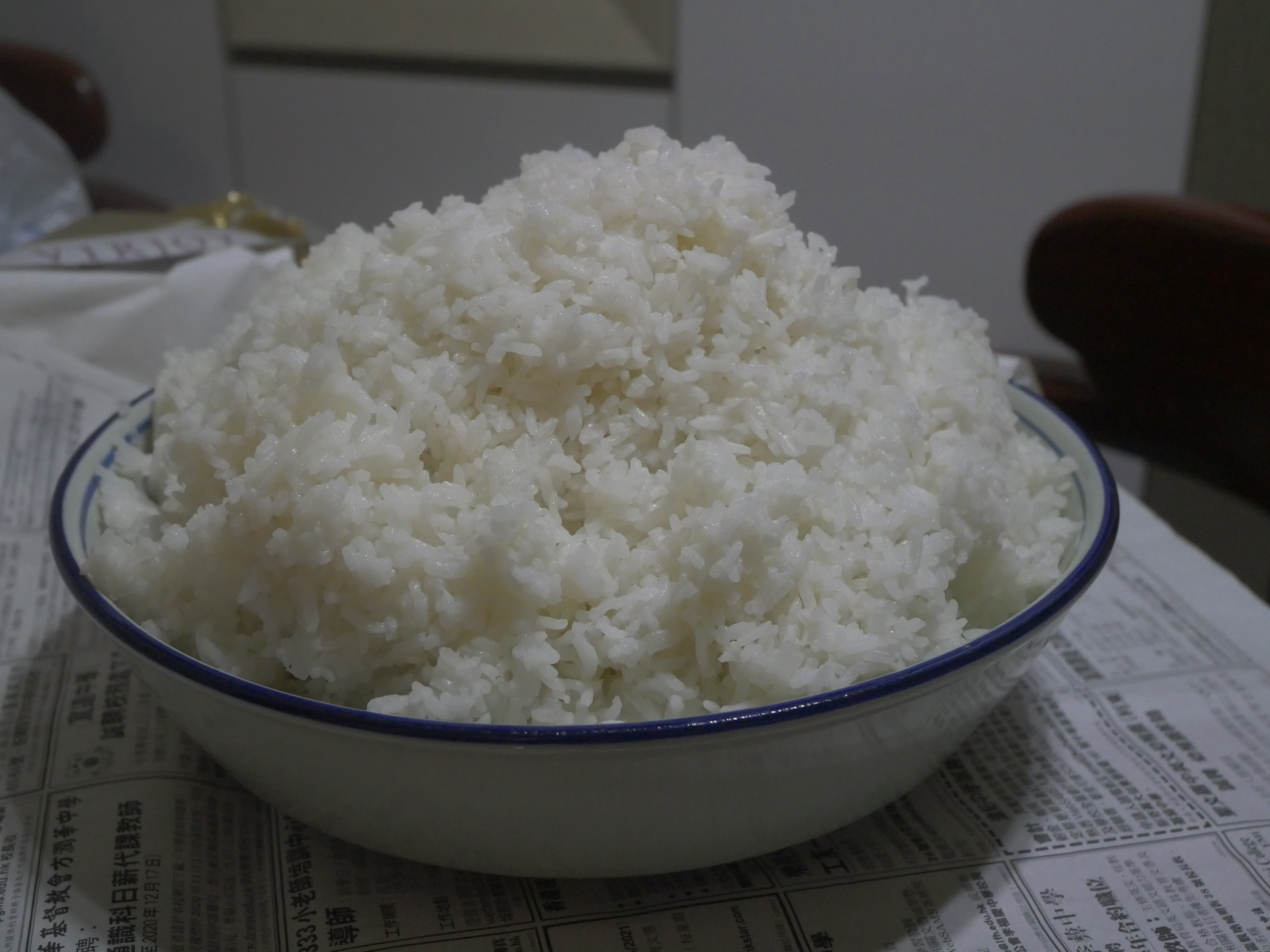
White rice is an example of a refined grain

Refined grains have been significantly modified from their natural composition, in contrast to whole grains. The modification process generally involves the mechanical removal of bran and germ, either through grinding or selective sifting.

== Overview ==
A refined grain is defined as having undergone a process that removes the bran, germ and husk of the grain and leaves the endosperm, or starchy interior. Examples of refined grains include white bread, white flour, corn grits and white rice. Refined grains are milled which gives a finer texture and improved shelf life. Because the outer parts of the grain are removed and used for animal feed and non-food use, refined grains have been described as less sustainable than whole grains.

After refinement of grains became prevalent in the early 20th-century, nutritional deficiencies (iron, thiamin, riboflavin and niacin) became more common in the United States. To correct this, the Congress passed the U.S. Enrichment Act of 1942 which requires that iron, niacin, thiamin and riboflavin have to be added to all refined grain products before they are sold. Folate (folic acid) was added in 1996.

Refining grain includes mixing, bleaching, and brominating; additionally, folate, thiamin, riboflavin, niacin, and iron are added back in to nutritionally enrich the product. Enriched grains are refined grains that have been fortified with additional nutrients. Whole grains contain more dietary fiber than refined grains. After processing, fiber is not added back to enriched grains. Enriched grains are nutritionally comparable to whole grains but only in regard to their added nutrients. Whole grains contain higher amounts of minerals including chromium, magnesium, selenium, and zinc and vitamins such as Vitamin B6 and Vitamin E. Whole grains also provide phytochemicals which enriched grains lack.

In the case of maize, the process of nixtamalization (a chemical form of refinement) yields a considerable improvement in the bioavailability of niacin, thereby preventing pellagra in diets consisting largely of maize products. Similar to whole grains, refined grains are a good source of starch, including resistant starch.

== Research ==
The dietary guidance of many countries is to replace refined grains with whole grains. The Dietary Guidelines for Americans (2020–2025) advises people to limit their intake of refined grains to be no more than half of total daily grain consumption.

=== Cardiovascular disease ===
The American Medical Association have advised people to consume whole grains instead of refined grains to improve cardiovascular risk factors.

A 2020 review of controlled trials that used the GRADE approach found that although whole grains have been shown to improve low-density lipoprotein and total cholesterol there is insufficient evidence to recommend "whole grains as opposed to refined grains for the prevention and treatment of CVD".

=== Obesity ===
There is no strong scientific evidence associating refined grains with obesity.

=== Cancer ===
Reviews have found that refined grain consumption (excluding cereal) is associated with an increased risk of gastric cancer.

=== Stroke ===
Refined grain consumption is not associated with stroke risk.

== Nutrition ==
Nutritional effects of refining or enriching wheat and rice
	Wheat			Rice		
	Whole	Refined	Enriched	Whole	Refined	Enriched
Food energy	100%	107%	107%	100%	99%	99%
Carbohydrates	100%	105%	105%	100%	104%	104%
Fiber	100%	22%	22%	100%	37%	37%
Protein	100%	75%	75%	100%	90%	90%
Thiamin (B_{1})	100%	27%	176%	100%	17%	144%
Riboflavin (B_{2})	100%	19%	230%	100%	53%	53%
Niacin (B_{3})	100%	20%	93%	100%	31%	82%
Pantothenic Acid (B_{5})	100%	43%	43%	100%	68%	68%
Pyridoxine (B_{6})	100%	13%	13%	100%	32%	32%
Folate (B_{9})	100%	59%	350%	100%	40%	1155%
Vitamin E	100%	5%	5%	100%	18%	18%
Calcium	100%	44%	44%	100%	100%	100%
Iron	100%	30%	120%	100%	54%	293%
Magnesium	100%	16%	16%	100%	17%	17%
Phosphorus	100%	31%	31%	100%	35%	35%
Potassium	100%	26%	26%	100%	52%	52%
Sodium	100%	40%	40%	100%	71%	71%
Zinc	100%	24%	24%	100%	29%	29%
Copper	100%	38%	38%	100%	79%	79%
Manganese	100%	18%	18%	100%	29%	29%
Selenium	100%	48%	48%	100%	65%	65%

== See also ==
- Ultra-processed food
- Whole-wheat flour
