= Meridian Manor =

- U.S. National Register of Historic Places
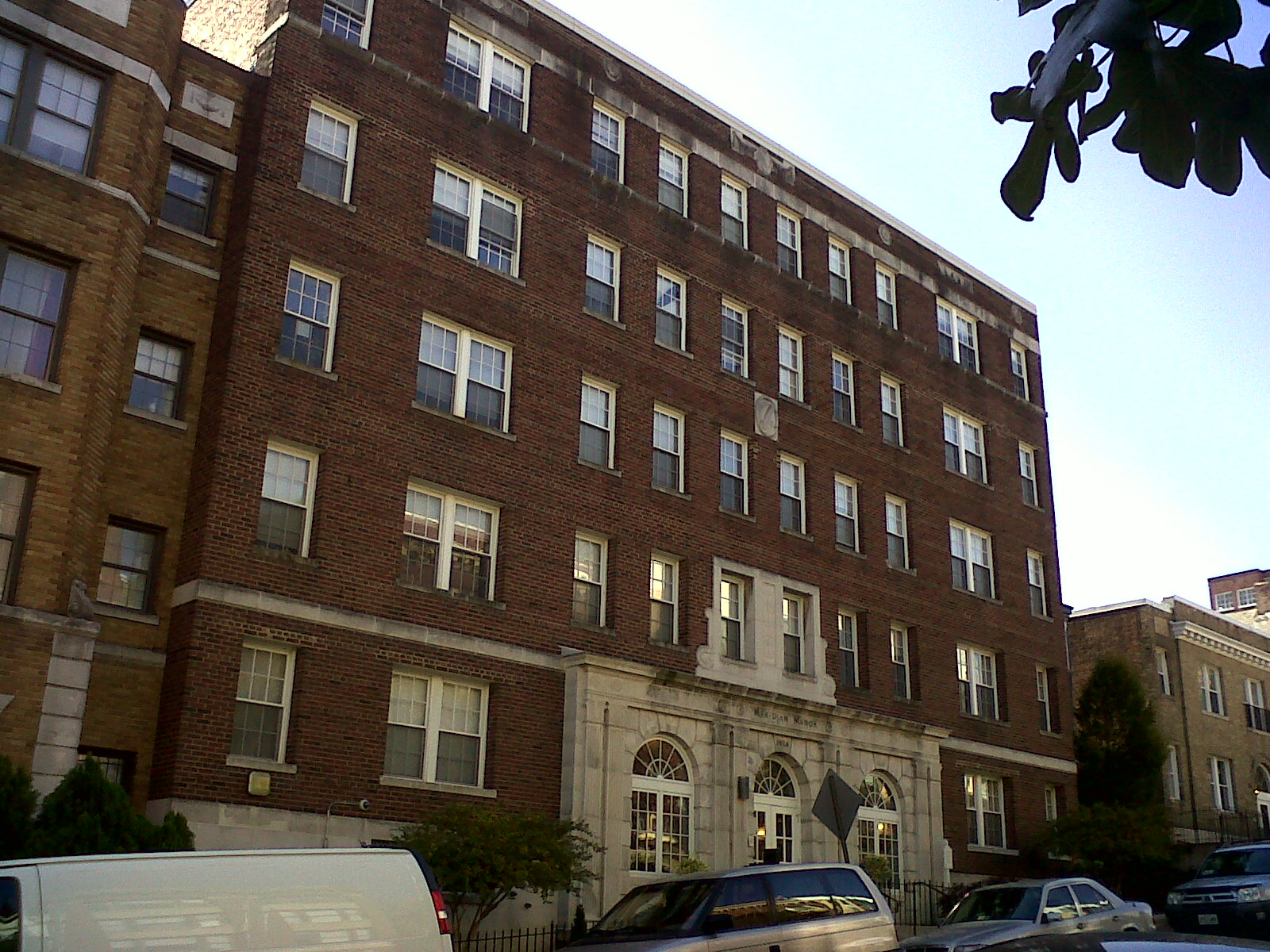

- Location within Washington, D.C.
- Location: 1424 Chapin St., NW; Washington, D.C.
- Coordinates: 38°55′17″N 77°1′59″W
- Built: 1926
- Architect: George T. Santmyers
- Architectural style: Colonial Revival
- NRHP reference No.: 01000324
- Added to NRHP: March 29, 2001

Meridian Manor is an historic structure located in the Meridian Hill neighborhood in the Northwest Quadrant of Washington, D.C. George T. Santmyers designed the structure in the Colonial Revival style. It exemplifies the speculative middle class apartment buildings that were constructed in Washington in the 1910s and 1920s near the 14th Street streetcar line. It was listed on the National Register of Historic Places in 2001.
