= Tilden Gardens =

Apartment complex in Washington D.C., US

- Interactive map of the Tilden Gardens area

General information
- Location: Washington, D.C.
- Coordinates: 38.940291°N 77.062122°W

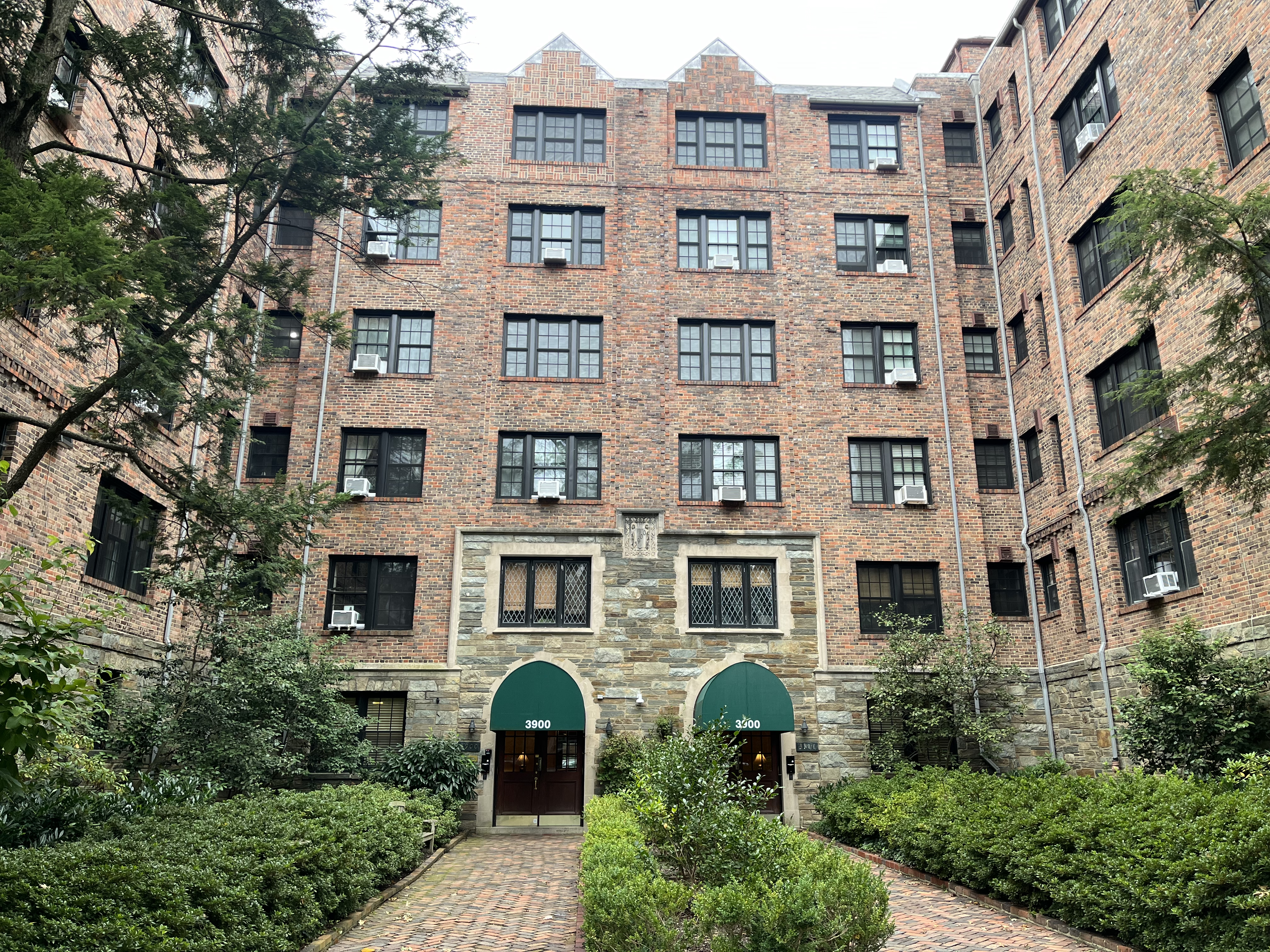

Tilden Gardens is a six-building apartment complex in the Cleveland Park neighborhood of Washington, DC. Constructed in the 1930s, it was the largest luxury apartment complex of its time.

Tilden Gardens fills the block between Connecticut Avenue, Tilden Street and Sedgwick Street in Cleveland Park. All six buildings center on a three-acre multilevel garden that has been described as the best of its kind in Washington, DC.

== History ==
The Tilden Gardens units were originally planned in 1927, as cooperatives (co-ops). However, due to the collapse of the housing market, most of them were not completed until after the Great Depression. The four later buildings' apartments were rented out through the 1930s. In 1935-36 and again in 1939, one apartment was rented to then Senator Harry Truman and his wife.

The first two Tilden Gardens buildings became legally separate cooperatives. By 1939, it became possible for owners to sell apartments again, and the later four buildings were incorporated as a single "Tilden Gardens" co-op.

== Description ==
Counting all six buildings, Tilden Gardens has 210 apartments, of which 170 are in the "Tilden Gardens" co-op as such. The later buildings were modified to include fewer large apartments and more one-bedroom apartments, in recognition of Depression economics.

Three of the original six buildings have an X shape and three have an H shape, After the designs had been approved, the developer decided to rotate and combine the F and G buildings. The resulting structure (still known as the F/G building) ended up with the oddity of two identical front doors a few feet apart.

The Tilden Gardens buildings have custom-made brick with limestone trim. The architecture has been described as Tudor Revival and Art Deco All the apartments have at least two exposures, and many have three.

== Notable tenants ==
- Harry S. Truman
- Lucius D. Clay
- Joseph Younger
