= Joseph Younger =

American architect

- Born: Joseph Arthur Younger; July 1, 1894
- Died: May 16, 1932 (aged 37)
- Occupation: Architect
- Known for: The Kennedy–Warren

Joseph Younger (July 1, 1894 – May 16, 1932) was an architect who lived and practiced in Washington, D.C., and is especially notable for his designs of the Kennedy–Warren Apartment Building on Connecticut Avenue NW, and for the Sixth Presbyterian Church on 16th Street NW.

== Life ==
Joseph Arthur Younger was a native of Washington, D.C., and was a graduate of the architecture school at George Washington University. He married Ethel Entwisle in 1920 and they had one son, Bruce.

For several years after graduation, Younger was associated with local Washington architectural firms such as Waggaman & Ray, and in 1922 he went into practice for himself. He designed several important buildings, including the Kennedy–Warren, and the Sixth Presbyterian Church, for which he received an award from the Washington Board of Trade. The Architects' Advisory Council had extended a high commendation for this work, and for that of the Blackstone Hotel. He also designed the Randolph Building at the corner of Randolph and 14th streets NW; and in 1925, 1661 Crescent Place NW, a cooperative apartment house for developers Monroe and Robert Warren. Younger is remembered for his balanced and graceful buildings.

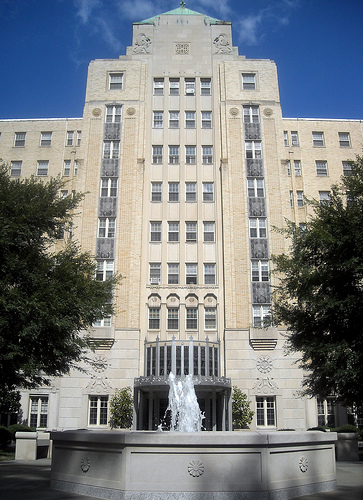
The Kennedy–Warren Apartment Building. Opened in 1931, it was designed by Joseph Younger.

The Kennedy–Warren Apartment Building is a well-known D.C. landmark. Published on the property's website is the following information: "Designed by Washington architect Joseph Younger in 1930, The Kennedy–Warren is considered the most important privately owned example of Art Deco style in the nation’s capital. The exterior of the building is remarkable for its attention to detail, from the carved limestone eagles embellishing the front entrance to the geometric aluminum spandrels flanked by a saw-tooth pattern of multicolor brick."

Prior to entering into his own practice, Joseph Younger wrote articles on American architecture, including one about Brentwood (which was designed by Benjamin Henry Latrobe), and made other contributions to the journal Architecture.

Joseph Younger died by suicide on May 16, 1932, at his home in the Tilden Gardens cooperative apartment complex, where he shot himself in the chest, in the presence of his wife.
