= Kennedy–Warren Apartment Building =

- U.S. National Register of Historic Places
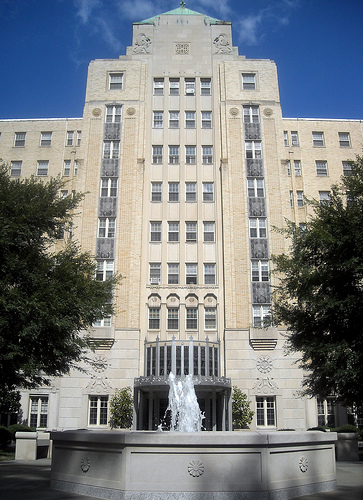

- Location within Washington, D.C.
- Location: 3133 Connecticut Ave., N.W., Washington, D.C.
- Coordinates: 38°55′54″N 77°3′21″W
- Area: 2.6 acres (1.1 ha)
- Built: 1931
- Architect: Younger, Joseph; Sonneman, A. H.
- Architectural style: Art Deco
- MPS: Apartment Buildings in Washington, D.C., MPS
- NRHP reference No.: 94001039
- Added to NRHP: September 7, 1994

The Kennedy–Warren Apartment Building is a historic 11-story structure at 3131–3133 Connecticut Avenue Northwest, between the Cleveland Park and Woodley Park neighborhoods of Washington, D.C.. The Art Deco building overlooks the National Zoological Park and Klingle Valley Park, which is near the Art Deco Klingle Valley Bridge. The original main building was built between 1930 and 1931 with 210 apartments.

The plans of its architect, Joseph Younger, called for a northeast wing and a south wing as well, but construction of these was stopped because of the onset of the Great Depression. The northeast wing was later built in 1935 with 107 additional apartments, as economic conditions improved in Washington. The B. F. Saul Company, owner of the building since 1935, added the south wing between 2002 and 2004. The architect of the northeast wing was Alexander H. Sonneman, and of the south wing was Hartman-Cox. The current total number of apartments, ranging from efficiencies to three-bedroom units, is 425.

The Kennedy–Warren is considered the largest and best example of an Art Deco building in Washington. In 1989, the building was listed as a District of Columbia Historic Landmark, and in 1994 it was added to the National Register of Historic Places. The newer south wing won numerous awards for the quality of its architecture, and for attention to historical detail, including the 2005 Award of Excellence for Historic Resources by the American Institute of Architects.

== Construction ==
In 1929, Monroe Warren Sr. approached Edgar S. Kennedy about the possibility of constructing a large apartment house on a tract that Kennedy owned on Connecticut Avenue. Kennedy was a partner with two brothers, William and Gordon, in Kennedy Brothers Company, a real estate development firm that had built a number of apartment houses in Washington, including Meridian Mansions (now The Envoy) at 2400 16th Street, N.W., facing Meridian Hill Park. Warren owned a construction firm, Monroe and R. B. Warren, Inc., that built co-operative apartment houses, including Tilden Gardens not far from the Kennedy–Warren.

Kennedy and Warren hired architect Joseph Younger (1894–1932) to design the building. Younger, a native of Washington, was a graduate of the architecture school at George Washington University, and had previously worked with Monroe Warren. Kennedy and Warren obtained $1.75 million in financing from the B. F. Saul Company, American Security Bank, and the Union Trust Company. They started work on the central section and the northwest wing (both facing Connecticut Avenue) in October 1930, and the building opened in October of the following year. Kennedy and Warren had been promised a loan by the Integrity Trust Company in Philadelphia to build the northeast and south wings, but it fell through with the worsening economic depression. In 1932, they filed for bankruptcy. B. F. Saul, as the principal creditor, obtained title to the building in 1935.

== Architecture ==
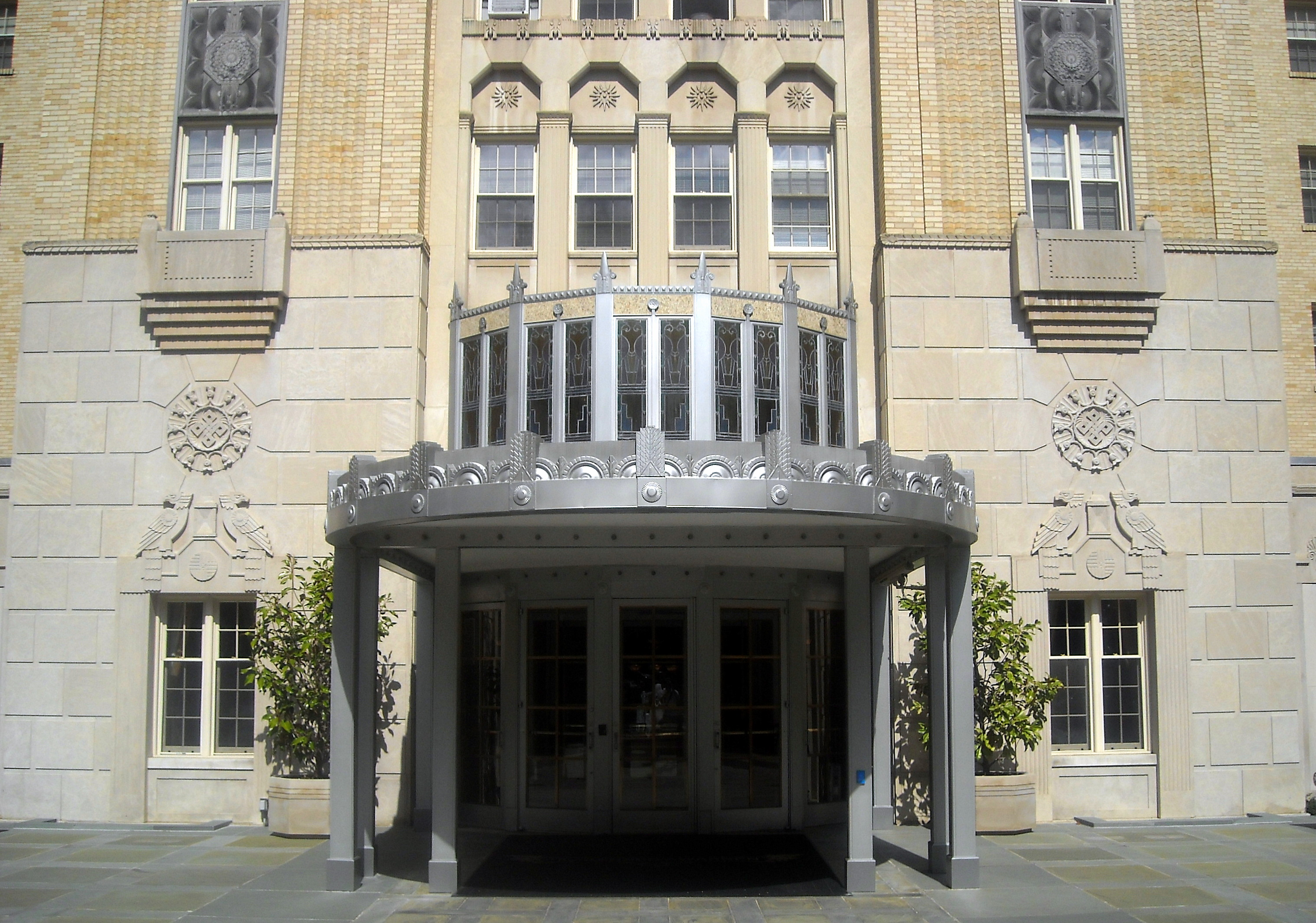
Main entrance to the Kennedy–Warren Apartment Building

Since the site of the Kennedy–Warren slopes steeply from Connecticut Avenue down to the National Zoo, the lobby level is designated as the third floor. The two residential levels below that have apartments that face the Zoo. Below those are four basement levels, including a large parking garage. The building is an imposing sight on Connecticut Avenue because of its massive size and fine detailing, which includes tan and orange variegated brick, limestone carvings, and the extensive use of aluminum. The Kennedy–Warren was the first building in Washington to use aluminum extensively; applications include the entrance porch, spandrels between the windows on the façade, balustrades in the lobby, and even an aluminum-leaf arched ceiling in the ground-floor corridors, unique in Washington. The stone carvings are in the Aztec Deco style, influenced by the carved stonework of ancient Mexico, and include griffins, eagles, and a frieze of elephants and starbursts and they rise three floors above street level.

An unusual feature of the Kennedy–Warren when it opened in 1931 was its air-cooling system. Three enormous fans drew cool air from Klingle Park at the back of the building and forced it through the public corridors. Residents could then open metal louvers above their hallway doors to cool individual apartments. Cross-ventilation during temperate weather was so effective that doorstops were required to prevent doors from slamming closed if left ajar. Advertisements for the Kennedy–Warren showed that the air was at least ten degrees cooler than on Connecticut Avenue. The fans were removed during the 2009–2011 renovation after central air conditioning was installed.

== Expansion ==
In 2002, B. F. Saul undertook construction of the uncompleted south wing. Obtaining the necessary permits and approvals had taken five years. The architect was Hartman-Cox of Washington. The plans followed Joseph Younger's 1931 design very closely for the exterior. The Belden Brick Company of Canton, Ohio made the variegated brick to match exactly the brick of the historic building. New carvings of Indiana limestone match those in the original building as well. The Boose Aluminum Foundry Company of Reamstown, Pennsylvania, cast the spandrels for the south wing. (ALCOA had cast the originals on the historic main building.) Hartman-Cox diverged from Younger's plans for the exterior in one respect by adding balconies to the south and east sides where the south wing faces the National Zoo.

Joseph Younger's plan for the interior called for long corridors running through each floor. Hartman-Cox consulted with Robert M. Swedroe Architects and Planners of Miami, who are experts in apartment floor plans. They proposed replacing the long corridors with two widely spaced elevators, which in some cases open directly into the apartments. Eliminating the corridors saved space, increased privacy, and allowed for much larger apartments, some of which are unusual "pass-through" apartments. They have windows on both the front and the back of the building. Only the corridor on the ground floor connects to the 1931 building. The layout of the apartments is traditional, with enclosed kitchens and formal dining rooms. The largest, with two bedrooms, two baths, and a den, is 2300 square feet.

The south wing was completed in 2004. The amenities include a fitness club with steam rooms and a swimming pool facing the zoo. There is a large parking garage as well.

== Rent control controversy ==
Shortly after the expansion construction began in 2002, B. F. Saul made several attempts to effectively remove the original wings of the Kennedy–Warren from being subject to the rent control laws of Washington. Although many tenants originally believed that the owners simply wanted to increase rents to take advantage of what was at the time a strong real estate market, it was later revealed that the company intended to gut the interior of the "Historic Wings" to convert them to high-end luxury apartments. This strategy began in 2002 with an attempt by the building's owner to have current tenants voluntarily agree to raise rents for all future tenants by 300 percent. When the agreement failed to obtain an adequate number of tenant signatures, the owners pursued rent control litigation in an attempt to charge tenants for the cost of performing repairs and other infrastructure work on the building. Many tenants believed that this action violated the tenant-owner agreement that had helped to resolve the earlier zoning impediments to the expansion, and the building's tenants' association resolved to fight the rent increase litigation in court.

In January 2008, Kennedy–Warren tenants began a rent strike in protest of the owner's attempts to increase rents. Washington officials called it the first large-scale rent strike of its kind in the city. Shortly after the beginning of the strike, the B. F. Saul Company again attempted to reach an agreement with tenants to dramatically raise rents for future tenants of the original wings. While the agreement received more than the minimum number of signatures required under the law, the content of the agreement was determined by the city government to be illegal and "patently coercive." Following the rejection of this agreement, many tenants have continued on the rent strike; litigation brought by the owner to increase rents – as well as tenant litigation challenging existing rents – is pending.

== Restoration of the historic main building ==
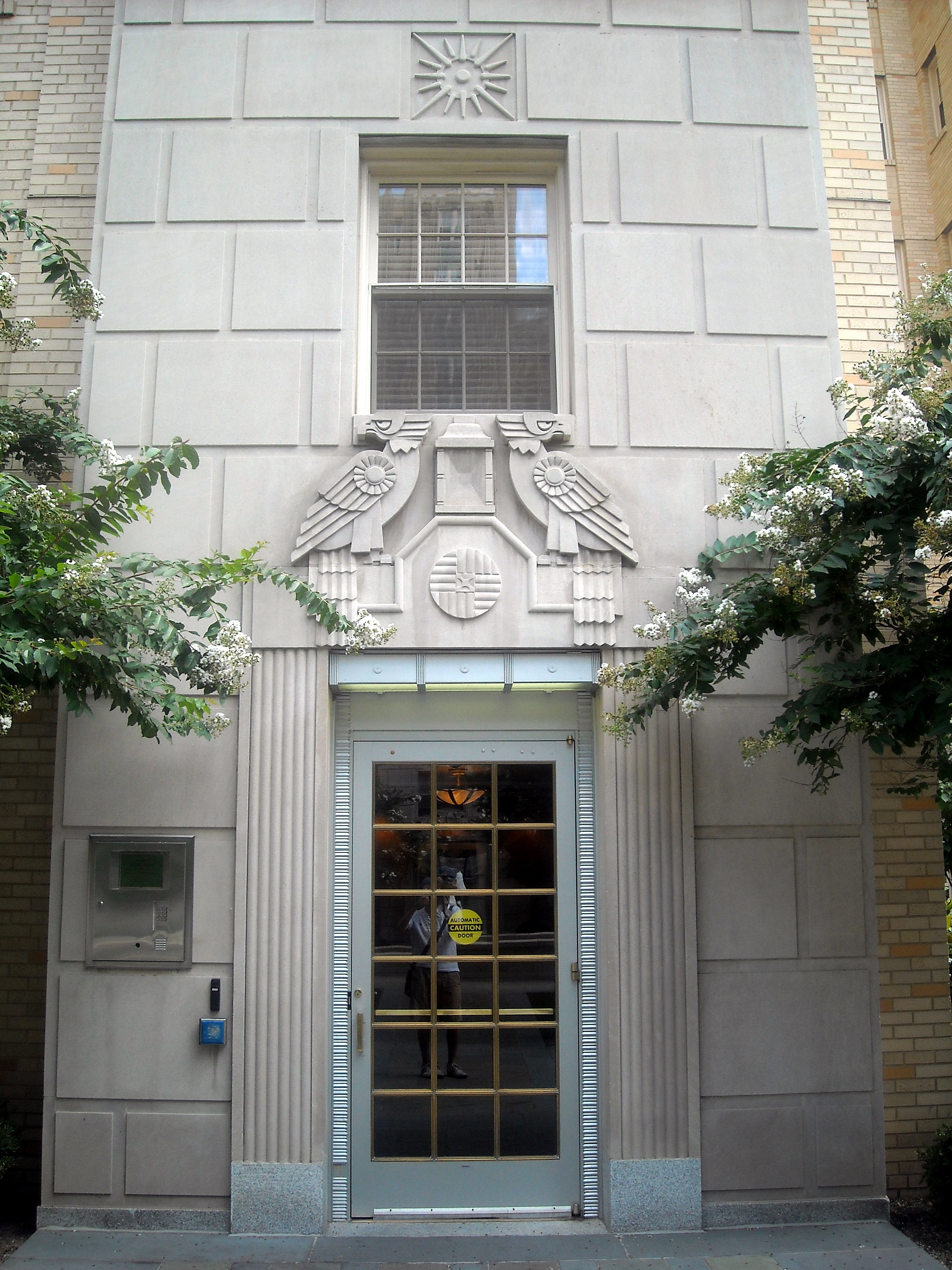
Limestone Aztec eagles above an entrance to the Kennedy–Warren

In 2009, B. F. Saul undertook the restoration and renovation of the historic main building, a project that was expected to cost $60 million. Contractors installed new double-hung mahogany windows, built a new roof and roof deck, and carefully cleaned the brick façade and aluminum spandrels following preservation standards. After discussions with the Art Deco Society of Washington as well as the residents, B. F. Saul decided to preserve the original floor plans of most apartments. As the contractors renovated each apartment, they kept the original hardware, including the glass door knobs and brass hinges, as well as the kitchen cabinets and apartment doors, and sanded and stained the original wood floors. To bring the building up to current standards, the wiring and plumbing were replaced, and a sprinkler system and central air-conditioning installed in the apartments and public areas. The central air-conditioning replaced window units as well as the huge basement fans, which had been in use since 1931. The company put new stoves and refrigerators in the apartments, and for the first time, washers and dryers. Shops and businesses on the lobby floor supplied such services for the residents.

Valley Craftsmen of Baltimore, Maryland, restored the elaborate Art Deco lobby. They re-stenciled the beamed ceiling in a geometric Art Deco design using gold leaf, and hand-painted the walls to resemble the original veneer panels. B. F. Saul replaced the missing Art Deco chandeliers and wall sconces and restored the handsome inlaid Art Deco elevator doors on the second, third, and fourth floors. On each side of the lobby is a lounge. The south lounge was restored to its original design, and the north lounge was converted to a piano bar which is open to residents. On the second floor there is a ballroom with fine Art Deco detailing. The ballroom was a popular venue for events of all kinds, and many of the best known big bands of the era played there. It has been closed for many years, but current plans (2011) call for it to be restored and reopened as an event space.

The Kennedy–Warren had a dining room which was operated as a public restaurant from 1931 until it closed in 1990. Such dining rooms once were common in Washington apartment houses, but the only one still in operation as of 2011 is in the Westchester, at 4000 Cathedral Avenue, N.W. B. F. Saul reportedly plans to reopen the Kennedy–Warren dining room, but it will be open only to residents.

== Notable residents ==
During the 1930s and 1940s, many military officers resided at the Kennedy–Warren. In 1937 alone, there were 75 officers in the building, including 5 generals. Admiral Royal Eason Ingersoll (1883–1976) lived there during World War II. He was commander in chief of the Atlantic Fleet, and is credited with organizing the defeat of the German U-boat fleet during the war. Major General “Pa” Watson (1883–1945) lived with his wife in penthouse apartment 1102 from 1933 to 1945. General Watson was President Franklin Roosevelt's senior military aide and appointment secretary. He accompanied FDR on all his travels, and died aboard ship in February 1945 while returning from the Yalta Conference. Harry Hopkins (1890–1946), FDR's closest political adviser, lived in the Kennedy–Warren during the 1930s. Hopkins headed three major New Deal agencies, including the Works Progress Administration. Lyndon Baines Johnson (1908–1973) and his wife, Lady Bird, lived in a three-bedroom apartment in 1937 and 1938 when he first came to Washington as a junior congressman from Texas. Major General Lorenzo D. Gasser, the U.S. Army's Deputy Chief of Staff of the United States Army immediately prior to World War II, lived at the Kennedy–Warren. Lt. Leslie B. Knox, an Australian-born Coral Sea Battle naval hero after whom the USS L. B. Knox was named, lived there with his wife, Louise Kennedy Knox, who sponsored the destroyer in 1943. Biochemist Benjamin R. Jacobs and his wife, Margaret Connell Jacobs, maintained a residence at the Kennedy–Warren.
