= George T. Santmyers =

American architect

George T. Santmyers (September 15, 1889 – December 26, 1960) was an American architect who practiced in Washington, D.C. for fifty years, beginning in 1909.

Santmyers was one of Washington's most prolific and noteworthy architects of the twentieth century. While he is credited with the design of a variety of commercial buildings, banks, churches, public garages and thousands of single-family residences, he is most celebrated for his contribution to apartment building architecture, working in most areas of the nation’s capital. As the architect of over 440 apartment buildings in the course of his long career, Santmyers devoted his talents and energy to producing skillfully-designed buildings with efficient plans. Most of his work was for the city’s commercial property developers, doing speculative structures. His ability to craft distinctive creations within a variety of budgets has given the city a fine legacy of buildings.

Santmyers was born in Front Royal, Virginia on September 15, 1889, and spent his early years in Baltimore, Maryland. He moved to Washington as a teenager, completed high school and then studied architecture at the Washington Architecture Club Atelier from 1908 to 1912. He had several years of training through apprenticeship in the offices of local architects. In 1913 he married Dorothy Featherstone. Santmyers' name first appears on a building permit in 1909, and by 1914 at age twenty-five he had opened his own architectural office. The work produced by his office far outstripped that of any other Washington, D.C. architect. The D.C. permit database credits Santmyers with designing more than 16,000 buildings, many times more than the next-busiest architects in the city. In 1960, still designing and running his office, he completed his last apartment building design at the age of 72, just six months before his death. He died in Wheaton, Maryland on December 26, 1960.

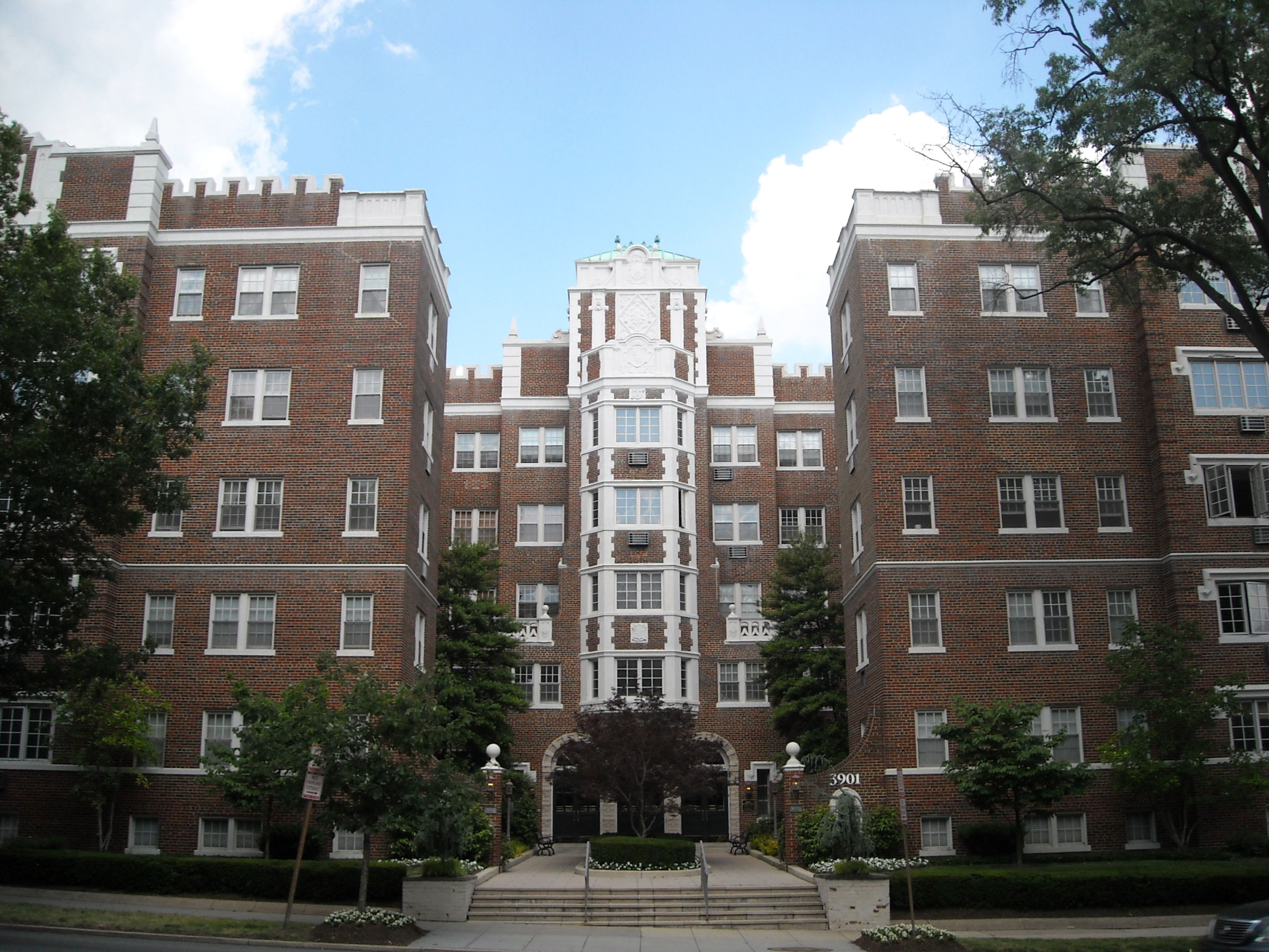
3901 Connecticut Avenue, NW. A six-story Tudor Revival apartment building, designed by George T. Santmyers in 1927.

His work included a range of styles, from Tudor Revival to Gothic to Colonial Revival; and as the Art Deco style became popular, he created some memorable apartment buildings in that motif. Two of the more prominent buildings that he designed are: 3901 Connecticut Avenue, NW (1927); and 2101 Connecticut Avenue, NW (1929) where he was assisted by Joseph Abel. The imposing brick structure of "2101" is now a co-op and is considered to be one of the finest apartment houses in the city. Both of these are listed on the National Register of Historic Places. Santmyers created many other exceptional apartments houses, most often in the Northwest areas of Washington; and several of these have also been historically registered. For instance, Meridian Manor, built in 1926 in the Colonial Revival style, and located in the Columbia Heights neighborhood, was listed on the National Register of Historic Places in 2001. A large number of his other works were standard residential structures, usually brick; many were rowhouses. Today, numerous and diverse blocks that make up the basic background landscape of the city of Washington are composed of buildings that were designed by George T. Santmyers.
