= LaKisha Jones =

American singer

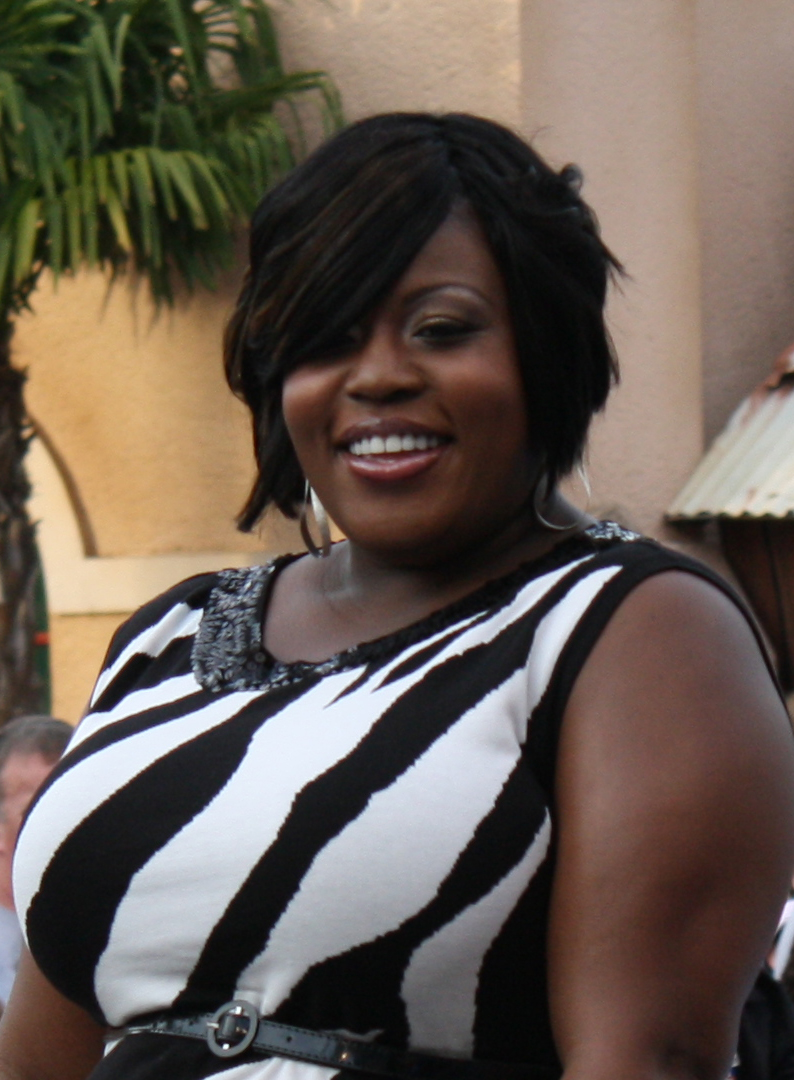
- LaKisha Jones in The American Idol Experience motorcade at Walt Disney World.

Background information
- Born: LaKisha Ann Jones
- Origin: Flint, Michigan, United States
- Genres: R&B, soul, gospel
- Occupations: Singer, plus-size model
- Instrument: Vocals
- Years active: 2007–present
- Label: Elite Music LLC
- Website: , www.myspace.com/LakishaJonesMusic

LaKisha Ann Jones is an American singer. She placed fourth on the sixth season of American Idol.

== Personal life ==
Jones was born at Hurley Medical Center in Flint, Michigan, to a teacher at the Flint Foundation Academy. She was raised by her grandmother, Ruth Jefferson Morris.

An only child, Jones is a Baptist who began singing at the Mount Zion Missionary Baptist Church at age five. She was formally trained in classical music, although her favorite genre is gospel music. Jones always dreamed of becoming a singer.

She was home schooled in Flint, then attended Flint Central High School, where, in one of her earliest performances, she appeared in a play called Lead Poisoning. While in high school, Jones performed with one of the groups in the choral department: the Madrigal Singers. Jones graduated in 1998 and attended the University of Michigan-Flint, majoring in music. During college, she performed in the play Godspell. Jones stated in her Idol interview that Flint, Michigan was her home. She was a single mother with a five-year-old daughter who encouraged her to try out for Idol.

Jones moved to Houston, Texas, where she lived for six years. One of her earliest jobs in Houston was that of a secretary at Abundant Life Cathedral, a church with 7,000 parishioners. Prior to working at the church, Jones sang in the 70-member choir. The choir has produced well-known gospel singer Yolanda Adams, among others. In 2006, Jones moved to Fort Meade, Maryland, in order to be closer to her cousins and other relatives. At that time, Jones obtained a job as a bank teller at Provident Bank in Millersville, Maryland, which she gave up when she moved to Hollywood to compete in American Idol.

Jones was the 1997 winner of Flint's amateur talent show, The Supershow, which is now-defunct. While living in Houston, she took second place in the 2005 Gimme the Mic competition.

On October 5, 2008 in Beverly Hills, California, she married Larry Davis, a financial advisor. She has two daughters.

== American Idol ==
=== Audition ===
Jones auditioned singing "Think" by Aretha Franklin. The judges were impressed with her powerful vocal and performance, and Simon noted that he "loved this girl". Jones was shown emotionally embracing her daughter after being sent into the next round. In her farewell montage on the episode of her elimination it was shown that she also sang "And I Am Telling You I'm Not Going" during her audition. She also performed Stevie Wonder's "Until You Come Back To Me" during one of the Hollywood audition rounds.

=== American Idol performances ===
Week #	Theme #	Song Choice	Original Artist	Order #	Result
Top 24 (12 Women)	N/A	"And I Am Telling You I'm Not Going"	Jennifer Holliday	12	Safe
Top 20 (10 Women)	N/A	"Midnight Train to Georgia"	Cissy Houston	3	Safe
Top 16 (8 Women)	N/A	"I Have Nothing"	Whitney Houston	6	Safe
Top 12	Diana Ross	"God Bless The Child"	Billie Holiday	8	Safe
Top 11	British Invasion	"Diamonds Are Forever"	Shirley Bassey	5	Safe
Top 10	No Doubt/Artist who inspire Gwen Stefani	"Last Dance"	Donna Summer	1	Safe
Top 9	American Classics	"Stormy Weather"	Ethel Waters	9	Safe^{1}
Top 8	Latin	"Conga"	Miami Sound Machine	2	Safe
Top 7	Country	"Jesus, Take the Wheel"	Carrie Underwood	4	Bottom 2^{2}
Top 6	Inspirational	"I Believe"	Fantasia Barrino	4	Safe
Top 6^{3}	Bon Jovi	"This Ain't a Love Song"	Bon Jovi	3	Safe
Top 4	Barry Gibb	"Stayin' Alive" "Run to Me"	Bee Gees	3; 7	Eliminated

- ^Note 1 When Ryan Seacrest announced the results for this particular night, Jones was declared safe placing in the top three.
- ^Note 2 When Ryan Seacrest announced the results for the particular night, Jones was among in the bottom three, but declared safe second when Sanjaya Malakar was eliminated.
- ^Note 3 Due to the Idol Gives Back performance, the Top 6 remained intact for another week.

== Post-American Idol ==
Jones toured with the Top 10 Idols on the Idols tour. She received positive reviews for her solo performance of "I Will Always Love You". She performed the Star-Spangled Banner at Comerica Park before the Detroit Tigers game on June 8, 2007 versus the New York Mets.

Jones also had two homecoming events. The first at the Abundant Life Cathedral Church in Houston, Texas (Houston was her home from 2000 to 2006) on May 30, 2007. This date was also declared 'LaKisha Jones Day' in Houston by Mayor Bill White.

The other homecoming was at Atwood Stadium, Flint, Michigan, where Jones was born and raised and where most of her family still resides, on June 9, 2007. It was at this ceremony that she received a $6,000 check and six-month free lease on a new Buick LaCrosse. She also received a Flint watch, personalized tree ornaments from Bronner's and a card signed by 300 fans.

In late September 2007, it was announced that Jones would take over the role of the church soloist in the Broadway musical The Color Purple as of January 9, 2008. Jones played the role of Sofia during matinées (standing in for Chaka Khan).

In June 2008, Jones vocal coached the girls on MTV's Legally Blonde: The Musical – The Search for Elle Woods. She demonstrated 'Amazing Grace' using chest and head voice with different vibratos. In May 2008, she appeared on American Idol Extra and Just As I Am, a song from her upcoming album. Her debut single So Glad I'm Me, written by Melanie Rutherford and produced by Edwin Nicholas, who produced soul musicians such as Patti LaBelle and Gerald Levert, was released on October 21, 2008. The album with the same title was released on May 19, 2009.

LaKisha Jones competed on the 2013 season of The Winner Is. She performed "Lady Marmalade" and was eliminated in the first round.

== Discography ==
=== Albums ===
Year	Album details	Peak positions		Certifications (sales threshold)
Year	Album details	US R&B	US Heat	Certifications (sales threshold)
2009	So Glad I'm Me: Released: May 19, 2009; Label: Elite Music LLC	47	24	US sales: 7,000

=== EPs ===
Album Information
LaKisha Jones EP
- Released: June 12, 2007 (US)
- RIAA certification: N/A

=== Singles ===
Single Information
"Let's Go Celebrate"
- Released: March 31, 2009 (U.S)
- RIAA certification: N/A
"Same Song"
- Released: August, 2009 (U.S)
- RIAA certification: N/A
