= Provident Bank of Maryland =

Provident Bank of Maryland was a bank in the U.S. state of Maryland. Provident Bank was the last largest independent commercial bank still headquartered in Maryland by the early 2000s, after the previous decade's wave of mergers which reduced the names and independent operations of most Baltimore banks to branch offices of larger, more affluent financial corporations and holding companies. Provident at the end with more than $6.4 billion in assets had also grown in its domestic home-grown reputation. Provident grew over the previous century, operating in total 143 branches in the Middle Atlantic states of Maryland, Pennsylvania, Virginia and Washington, D.C. Upon entering the Washington, D.C., and Virginia markets, the bank began to operate as "Provident Bank". Provident Bank was now a subsidiary of the bank holding operation of Provident Bankshares Corporation.

The bank was founded as the Provident Savings Bank of Baltimore in 1886. Provident was one of the first banks to operate in-store small bank branches that are located within grocery stores, operated by the locally based Rite Aid (Read's) drug store chain that branched into food retail supermarkets in the 1970s. In 2007, Provident Bank made a $500,000 gift to Villa Julie College in north suburban Baltimore County in the county seat of western Towson. In the next few years, the formerly female, small business and secretarial college, began greatly expanding its curriculum and campus, changing its name to Stevenson College, for the name of the area and old road in its vicinity.

After almost going under in 1983, Provident brought in two men who were willing to risk their careers to help revitalize the old savings bank; Carl Stearn and Peter M. Martin.

In the mid-1980s, Provident purchased and restored the former Federal Reserve Bank of Richmond's Baltimore Branch building, at the northwest corner of North Calvert and East Lexington Streets.

Ten years following, at Martin's 2001 retirement, he had reverted the path of the bank, making it the largest regional bank of the area, and earning himself the position of Chairman of the Maryland Bankers Association. His successor's errors, however, plunged the bank into the worst of the 2008–2009 "Great Recession" crisis.

On October 15, 2008, Provident announced the acquisition of seven Chevy Chase Bank (originally Chevy Chase Savings and Loan Association, founded 1892 from Chevy Chase, Maryland in the Washington, D.C., northern suburbs of Montgomery County) branch deposits. The deposit base, totalling more than $40 million, was from branches located in Giant grocery stores (Landover, Maryland chain, founded in Washington, D.C.) in the Baltimore area. The acquisition included over 8000 commercial and retail customers. Provident paid a 3% net deposit to Chevy Chase Bank.

Provident announced on December 19, 2008 that it was to be acquired by Buffalo-based M&T Bank in western New York State, (formerly Manufacturers and Traders Trust Company, founded 1856) in a $401 million stock-for-stock deal. The buyout was approved by Provident shareholders on April 8, 2009.

May 22, 2009 was the final day of the old Provident Bank. Upon re-opening on May 26, 2009, almost all Provident locations opened with new M&T Bank signage. Some buildings, including training locations, were not reopened. In the transition, over 500 employees lost their jobs. This was approximately 29% of Provident's total employee base. All positions were non-customer facing jobs located mostly at the headquarters in Baltimore.

American Idol contestant LaKisha Jones is a former employee of Provident Bank.
