= Enriched flour =

Flour with nutrients added

Enriched flour is flour with specific nutrients added to it. These nutrients include iron and B vitamins (folic acid, riboflavin, niacin, and thiamine). Calcium may also be supplemented. The purpose of enriching flour is to replenish the nutrients in the flour to match the nutritional status of the unrefined product. This differentiates enrichment from fortification, which is the process of introducing new nutrients to a food.

79 countries have made fortification or enrichment for wheat or maize flour mandatory, according to the Global Fortification Data Exchange.

== History ==
White flour became adopted in many cultures because it was thought to be healthier than dark flours during the late Middle Ages. As white flour was more expensive it became a fashionable indicator of perceived social status and tended to be consumed mostly by the richer classes. Another factor was that mold and fungus in the grains, which led to several diseases, were significantly reduced in the processing that resulted in white flour.

In the 1920s, Benjamin R. Jacobs began to document the loss of essential nutrients, however, through this processing of cereals and grains and to demonstrate a method by which the end products could be enriched with some of the lost nutrients. Enrichment was not possible until 1936, when the synthesis of thiamine was elucidated.

The international effort to start enriching flour was launched during the 1940s as a means to improve the health of the wartime populations of the United Kingdom and United States while food was being rationed and alternative sources of the nutrients were scarce. The decision to choose flour for enrichment was based on its commonality in the diets of those wartime populations, ranging from the rich to the poor. These wartime campaigns resulted in 40% of flour being enriched by 1942. In February 1942, the U.S. Army announced that it would purchase only enriched flour. This resulted in a large expansion of enrichment, but smaller local mills were still selling cheap, unenriched flour that could end up consumed by the poor, who needed enrichment the most. In 1943, the War Foods Administration issued a temporary ban on non-enriched bread, finally raising enrichment compliance to 100%.

== Enrichment requirements ==
According to the U.S. FDA, a pound of flour must have the following quantities of nutrients to qualify as enriched: 2.9 milligrams of thiamine, 1.8 milligrams of riboflavin, 24 milligrams of niacin, 0.7 milligrams of folic acid, and 20 milligrams of iron. The first four nutrients are B vitamins. Calcium also may be added; this must be to a minimum level of 960 milligrams per pound if calcium is mentioned in the labeling. Similar rules are set for grains like rice and cornmeal.

Other countries also have flour enrichment programs.

== See also ==
- Iodised salt – which might be called "fortified salt".
- Whole-wheat flour
- Ultra-processed food
