= John Hennessy Saul =

American horticulturist (1819–1897)

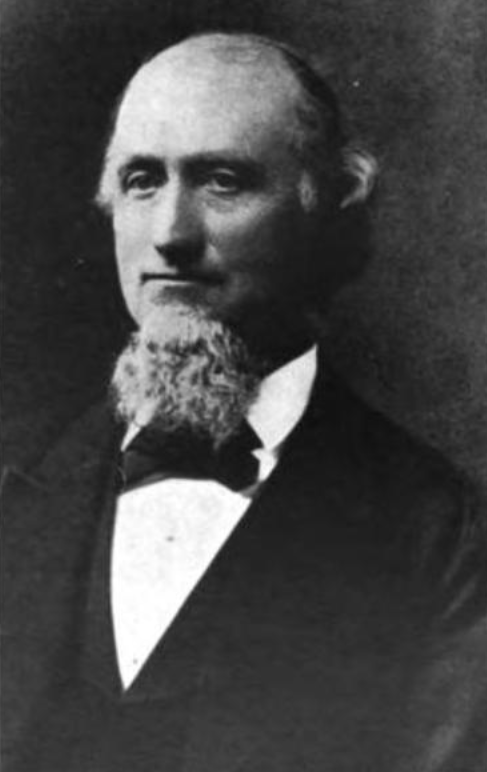
- Portrait of Saul
- Born: December 25, 1819; County Cork, Ireland
- Died: May 11, 1897 (aged 77); Washington, D.C., U.S.
- Resting place: Mount Olivet Cemetery; Washington, D.C., U.S.
- Occupation: landscape architect
- Known for: development of the National Mall in Washington D.C.
- Spouse: Rosina Mary Lawley (m. 1850)
- Children: Bernard Francis Saul
- Family: Bernard Frances Saul II (great-grandson)

John Hennessy Saul (December 25, 1819 – May 11, 1897) was an Irish-born American horticulturist and landscape architect who assisted in the planning and the development of the National Mall in Washington, D.C., and served as the first chairman of Washington, D.C.’s parks commission.

== Early life ==
John Hennessy Saul was born in County Cork, Ireland, the son of James Saul (1779–1869) and Mary Hennessy (1790–1880), both also born in County Cork. His surname is of Norman-Irish origin being a corruption of DeSalle. Saul worked in various nurseries in the British Isles, assisting his father, eventually becoming a manager of several nurseries. In 1841 he was recorded as working as a gardener at Llantarnam Abbey whilst the rest of his family were with their father who was working on the estate at East Cowes Castle.

== Career ==
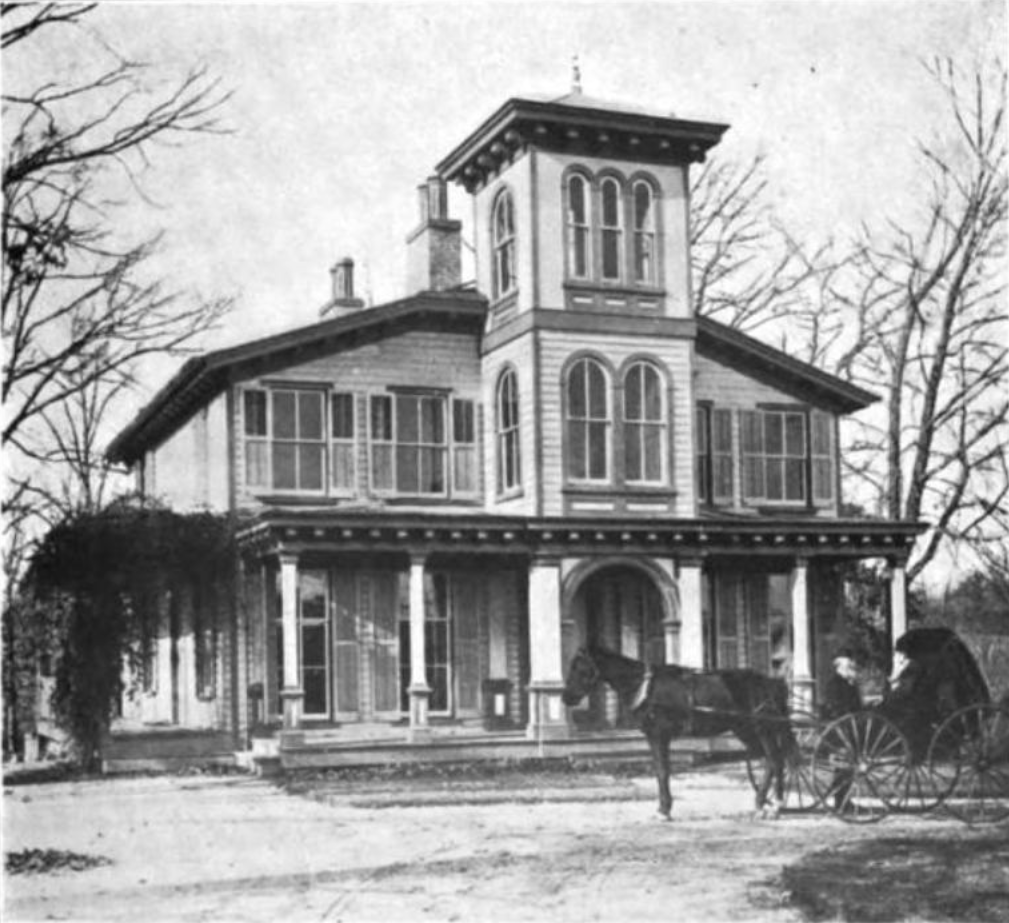
Home of Saul in Washington, D.C.

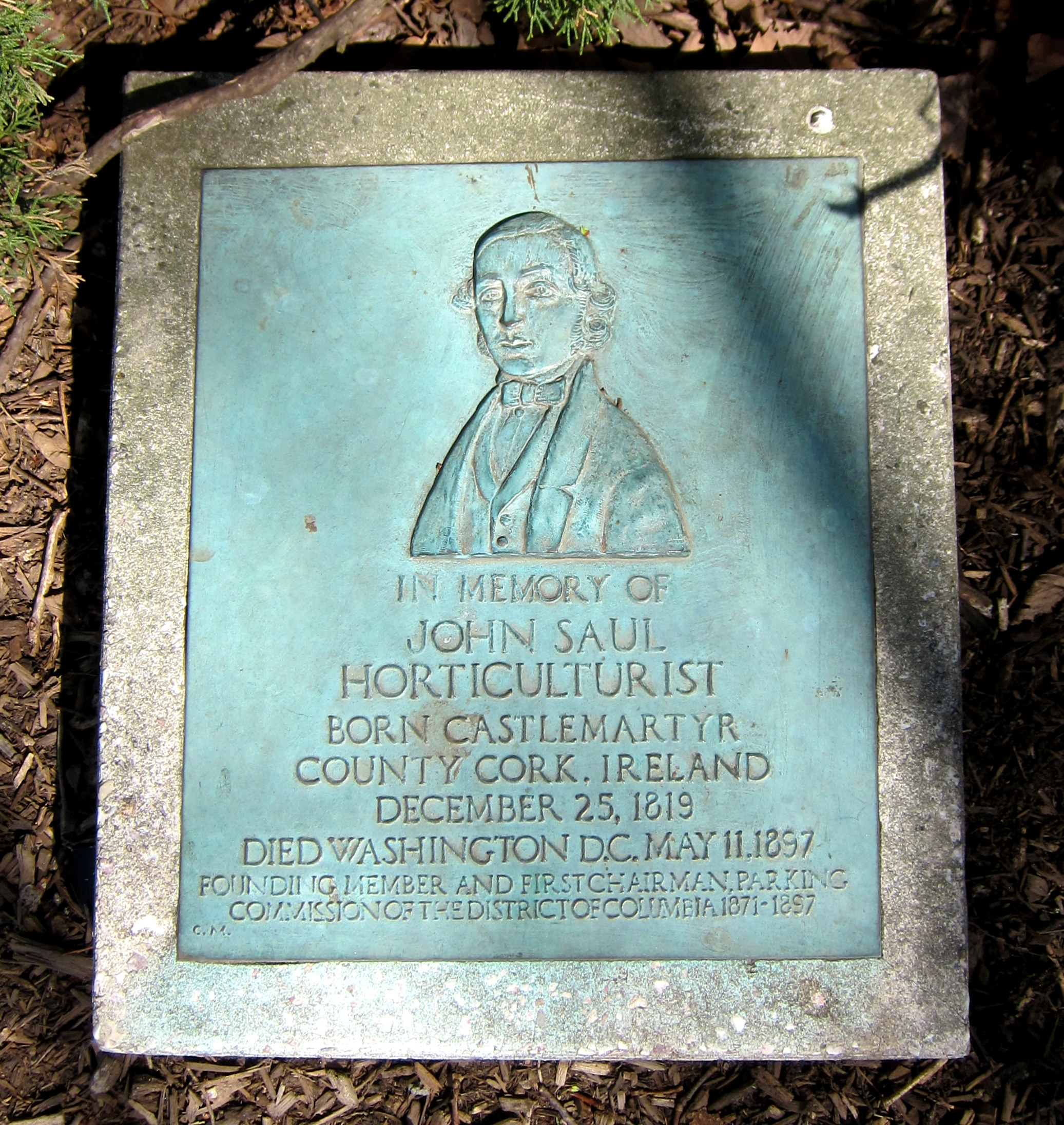
A plaque on E Street NW southeast of the White House

In 1851, he emigrated to the US preceded by his brother, also a horticulturalist, who had emigrated in 1849, to work for noted landscape architect Andrew Jackson Downing. From 1851 to 1853, he was responsible along with William Dunlop Brackenridge for improving the National Mall, Lafayette Square, and the Smithsonian Museum grounds.

In 1852, he started a seed business. In 1854, Saul became the first Chairman of Washington's Parks commission, the forerunner of the Park and Planning Commission for the city. In 1854, he purchased his first nursery and in 1872, he purchased his second. He operated twenty greenhouses using his horticultural skills to create numerous new varieties of plants. He was a member of the American Society of Florists and was a frequent contributor to the journal The Horticulturalist.

== Personal life and death ==
He married Rosina Mary Lawley, daughter of a German clockmaker, Josef Laule, later anglicised to Joseph Lawley. She was born in Bath, Somerset, England in 1825 and they married in a Catholic ceremony in Bath in 1850. His son, Bernard Francis Saul (January 16, 1872 – February 1, 1931) was the founder Washington, D.C.'s first mortgage bank, the B. F. Saul Company.

Saul died on May 11, 1897, at his home on Brightwood Road (now Georgia Avenue) in Washington, D.C. He was interred at Mount Olivet Cemetery.
