= Hannah L. Wessling =

American chemist

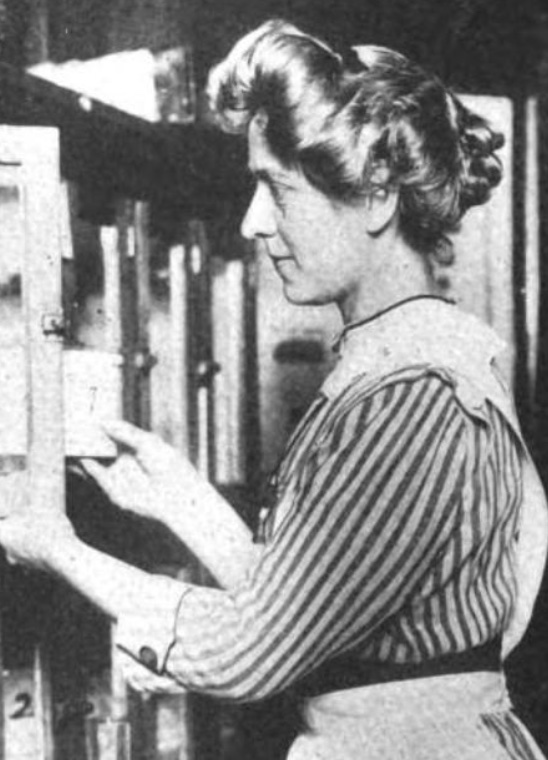
- Hannah L. Wessling, from a 1914 newspaper
- Born: May 26, 1873; Cincinnati, Ohio, U.S.
- Died: January 18, 1960 (aged 86); Tracy, California, U.S.
- Other name: Hanna L. Wesseling
- Occupations: Chemist, food scientist

Hannah Louise Wessling (May 26, 1873 – January 18, 1960) was an American chemist, billed as "Uncle Sam's Bread Maker" during World War I.

== Early life and education ==
Wessling was from Cincinnati, Ohio, the daughter of John Henry Wessling and Mary Dorothea Rabbe Wessling. Her father and her maternal grandparents were born in Germany. She graduated from Woodward High School in 1894.

== Career ==
Wessling taught chemistry in Cincinnati as a young woman. In the 1910s and 1920s, Wessling worked for the United States Department of Agriculture in Chicago and later in Washington, D.C. She was a food scientist, testing flours and creating optimal recipes and equipment for home baking, using alternative ingredients or varying pan sizes. "Miss Wessling has devoted considerable time--thirteen years--in the work of making bread, jellies, preserves, and canning fruit, and later analyzing them as a chemist," explained one 1910 newspaper report. Her work took on particular relevance during World War I, when food conservation required some substitutions in traditional recipes, and working women sought more efficient and economical ways to bake.

Wessling was a home economist for the Northwest Yeast Company from 1922 into the 1940s. She spoke at the American Home Economics Association meeting in Buffalo in 1924.

== Publications ==
- "Use of Wheat Flour Substitutes in Baking" (1918)
- "The Chemical Analysis of Wheat-flour Substitutes and of the Breads Made Therefrom" (1920, with Joseph Arthur Le Clerc)
- Baking in the Home (1921)
- "Home-Breadmaking is Simple" (1931)

== Personal life ==
Wessling lived in California in her later years. She died in 1960, at the age of 86.
