= John L. Saul =

British novelist and short story writer

John Saul (born Liverpool, England, 1 October 1948) is a British novelist and short story writer.

== Biography ==
Born in Liverpool, Saul has also lived in France, Canada, Germany and Ecuador, where he began writing fiction. His short stories (over 180) have appeared in the United Kingdom, Ireland, Australia and Canada, as well as in Germany, France, Italy, Sweden and the United States.

John Saul is the author of Call It Tender and The Most Serene Republic: love stories from cities, and as rivers flow, all published by Salt Publishing, and with artwork by Albert Irvin of "The Book of Joys", published by Confingo. The Times wrote of Call It Tender on 9 June 2007 that "the short story is not only alive but being reinvigorated in excitingly diverse ways" and Time Out (18 July 2007) "It represents Saul at the peak of his powers." Saul's third book of short stories, as rivers flow - "a beautifully conceived collection", said the Short Review (5 Oct 2009) - appeared in 2009.

In 2013, Saul began a project with the musician Jan Pulsford that saw performances at the National Portrait Gallery, London and the Writeidea Festival in London. Saul's short fiction was shortlisted for the 2015 Sean O'Faolain prize and was included in Best British Short Stories 2016 (Salt) and in "Best British Short Stories 2023". Work of his was selected as the contribution from the United Kingdom to Best European Fiction 2018 (Dalkey Archive), an annual anthology for which he was also shortlisted in 2012.

"John Saul is one of our best short story writers." — Nicholas Royle Time Out

== Bibliography ==
Novels

- Heron and Quin (Aidan Ellis, 1990)

Short stories

- The Book of Joys (Confingo Publishing, 2024)
- As Rivers Flow (Salt Publishing, 2009)
- The Most Serene Republic (Salt Publishing, 2008)
- Call it Tender (Salt Publishing, 2007)

Anthologies

- Best British Short Stories (Salt 2023)
- Best European Fiction 2018 (Dalkey Archive, US 2017)
- Best British Short Stories (Salt, 2016)
- These Are Our Lives (Stinging Fly, Ireland 2006)
- Sex, Drugs, Rock'n'Roll: Stories to end the century (Serpent's Tail, 1997)
- New Writing 5 (Vintage, 1996)
- Cold Comfort (Serpent's Tail, 1996)
- New Writing 4 (Vintage, 1995)
- Border Lines (Serpent's Tail, 1993)
- Sex and the city (Serpent's Tail, 1989)
- Best of the Fiction Magazine (JM Dent, 1986)

== Websites & Online Resources ==
Salt Contemporary Writers profile
http://www.johnsaul.co.uk/
