= Bernard Francis Saul =

American banker (1872–1931)

Bernard F. Saul
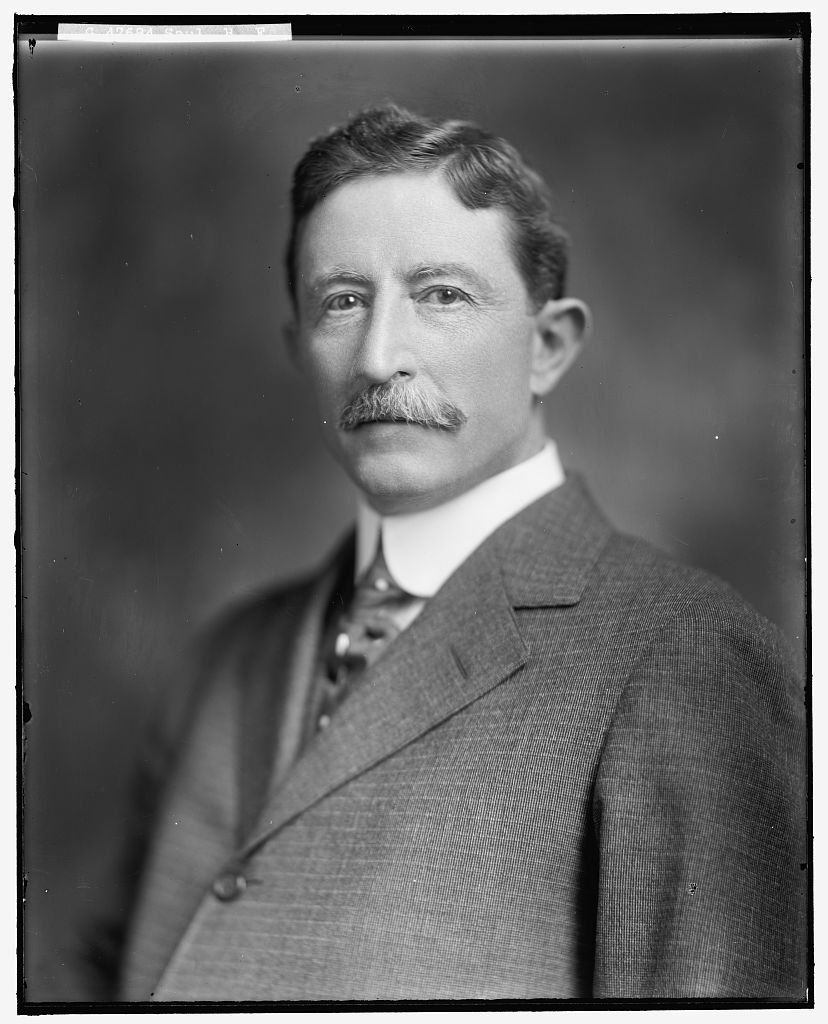
- Born: January 16, 1872
- Died: February 1, 1931 (aged 59)
- Occupation: Mortgage banker
- Known for: B. F. Saul Company
- Spouse: Frances E. Maguire (m. 1898)
- Children: 6
- Father: John Hennessy Saul
- Family: Bernard Francis Saul II (grandson)

Bernard Francis Saul (January 16, 1872 – February 1, 1931) was an American banker and businessman. He was the founder of Washington D.C.'s first mortgage bank, the B. F. Saul Company.

== Biography ==
Bernard Francis Saul was born in 1872. His father, John Hennessy Saul, was a horticulturist and landscape architect, born in County Cork, Ireland and emigrating to the United States in 1851 to take over planning and development of the National Mall in Washington D.C. His mother, Rosina Mary Lawley, was born in Bath, Somerset, England and his parents had married in a Catholic ceremony in Bath in 1850. In 1890, he took a job as a clerk with the National Bank of the Republic. In 1891, he handled the sale of his father's botanical nurseries, taking accepting promissory notes from buyers which he resold to the public and in doing so, he formed Washington D.C.'s first significant mortgage bank, the B. F. Saul Company.

In 1899, Saul founded a retail bank, the Home Savings Bank, which provided financing to several of Washington D.C.'s prominent businessmen including Malcolm Gibbs, the founder of Peoples Drug, and real estate developer Harry Wardman. In 1919, he merged Home Savings Bank and its commercial banking capabilities, with the trust operations of American Security & Trust, whose president, Charles J. Bell (and cousin of Alexander Graham Bell), was a close personal friend. As payment, Saul received a large block of American Security and Trust stock and became chairman of its executive committee. Being a minority owner in American Security & Trust, Saul then focused his attention on his mortgage bank, the B.F. Saul Company, expanding its operations into property management, leasing, development, and insurance. This diversification soon proved beneficial and is the primary reason his bank survived the Stock market crash of 1929 and the Great Depression becoming, at the time, the largest financial services company in Washington D.C.

== Personal life ==
In 1898, he married Frances E. Maguire in Manhattan, New York. She was the daughter of Andrew and Frances Willoughby Maguire. The Sauls lived on 13th St in NW DC. They had six children: John M. Saul; Bernard Francis Saul Jr. (died 1954); Frances M. Saul (died 1930); Rose Saul; Andrew M. Saul (died 1985); and Teresa Saul.

Saul's grandson, Bernard Francis Saul II, is the president of the B. F. Saul Company which employs over 3,000 people and services in over $2.5 billion in mortgages for institutional investors.
