= Bernard Saul II =

American billionaire and businessman

- Born: April 15, 1932 (age 94)
- Education: Villanova University; University of Virginia
- Occupations: Chairman and CEO, Saul Centers
- Relatives: Bernard Francis Saul (paternal grandfather); John Hennessy Saul (great-grandfather)

Bernard Francis Saul II (born April 15, 1932 ) is an American billionaire heir and businessman. He is the chairman and chief executive officer (CEO) of Saul Centers, private real estate firm based in Bethesda, Maryland, since 1993.

== Early life ==
Saul is the grandson of the company's founder, Bernard Francis Saul. He has a bachelor's degree from Villanova University, and an LLB from the University of Virginia School of Law.

== Career ==
Saul has been the chairman and chief executive officer of Saul Centers, a private real estate firm based in Bethesda, Maryland, since June 1993.

As of February 2025, Forbes estimates Saul's net worth at US$2.8 billion.

== Philanthropy ==
Saul is a strong supporter of Roman Catholic causes; in 1991, the then pope awarded him the Pro Ecclesia et Pontifice medal.

== Personal life ==
Saul is married, with five children, and lives in Chevy Chase, Maryland, U.S. His son, B. Francis Saul III, is a member the board of trustees at the Center for the Study of the Presidency and Congress, a non-partisan policy think tank in Washington, DC.
