= B. F. Saul Company =

Private real estate firm based in Bethesda, Maryland, US

- Industry: Real estate
- Founded: 1892; 134 years ago
- Founder: Bernard Francis Saul
- Headquarters: Bethesda, Maryland, U.S.
- Website: bfsaul.com

B. F. Saul Company is a real estate firm based in Bethesda, Maryland. The company owns and manages several properties in the Washington metropolitan area and one property in Fort Lauderdale, Florida. Notable properties include the Hay-Adams Hotel and the Kennedy-Warren Apartment Building.

The company is an affiliate of Saul Centers, Inc., a public company and real estate investment trust that is a component of the S&P 600 index.

== History ==
On December 1, 1892, at the age of 19, Bernard Francis Saul founded Saul Company in Washington, D.C. Saul Company became a successful mortgage bank and developer. Within 8 years of starting the firm, B. Francis Saul founded the Home Savings Bank and soon after merged it with the American Security and Trust Company. Saul Company became B. F. Saul Company. Saul's grandson, Bernard Saul II, is currently CEO and chairman of the firm. His great-grandson B.F. Saul III resigned as president of the firm in 2012 to found his own company, Saul Urban.

In 1969, Bernard Saul II founded Chevy Chase Bank. That same year, the B.F. Saul Real Estate Investment Trust became a public company via an initial public offering.

In 1931, the company acquired the Kennedy-Warren Apartment Building after its prior owners went bankrupt during the Great Depression.

In 1976, the hotel division was founded.

In 1983, the company serviced a $2 billion in mortgages and originated another $500 million in mortgages annually.

In 1988, the company took B.F. Saul Real Estate Investment Trust private.

In 1993, Saul Centers, Inc. was formed to hold much of the company's real estate assets and became a public company via an initial public offering.

In 1997, B.F. Saul Real Estate Trust announced plans for additional developments in Atlanta.

In 2004, the company completed a $70 million expansion of the Kennedy-Warren Apartment Building. In December 2006, the company began construction of Park Place II, an 11-story, 312,897 square foot office building in Tysons, Virginia. In March 2009, Hilton Worldwide leased one-third of the building. In 2017, Hilton began seeking alternative locations.

In 2009, due to the 2008 financial crisis, the Saul family sold Chevy Chase Bank to Capital One for $520 million in cash and stock.

In 2012, the company completed a $50 million renovation of the Kennedy-Warren Apartment Building. In July 2012, the company ended a partnership with Montgomery County, Maryland to develop a property near Wheaton station. In September 2012, B. Francis Saul III resigned from Saul Centers, Inc.

In October 2013, the company sold its remaining holdings in Atlanta, Georgia for $45 million.

In 2016, the company began a 10-story Homewood Suites by Hilton hotel in Rosslyn, Virginia.

In 2021, the company became the operator of the Capital One Watermark Hotel in Tysons, Virginia.

=== Saul Centers, Inc. ===
In February 2014, Saul Centers, Inc. acquired a property near Twinbrook in Rockville, Maryland for $62.5 million. In April 2017, Saul Centers, Inc., announced plans to develop 10 buildings on the site.

In November 2015, Saul Centers, Inc. proposed constructing a 483-unit apartment building with 68,000 square feet of retail in Ballston, Virginia. In May 2017, Target Corporation signed a lease at the property. In August 2017, Saul Centers secured a $157 million loan for the development.
