= Israeli naval campaign in Operation Yoav =

Aspect of the 1948 Arab–Israeli War

The Israeli naval campaign in Operation Yoav refers to the operations of the Israeli naval service (later Israel Navy) during Operation Yoav (October 15–22, 1948) in the final stage of the 1948 Arab–Israeli War. The main objective of the naval service was to disrupt the supply lines from Egypt to Palestine, completing the Egyptian expeditionary force's encirclement, and force Egypt to allocate large forces to fight against targets at sea instead of on the ground, where Operation Yoav was conducted.

Israel's four warships at the time, INS Wedgwood (K-18), INS Haganah (K-20), INS Ma'oz (K-24) and INS Noga (K-26), participated in the operation. The two main naval engagements were the October 19 battle in the waters of Majdal (today Ashkelon), and the sinking of the Egyptian flagship Emir Farouk on October 22, which also damaged an Egyptian minesweeper. The latter operation helped shape the Israeli navy's doctrine of the use of small weapon systems as opposed to conventional fleets.

== Background ==
The Israeli naval service was founded in March 1948 out of the Palyam, a small naval contingent of the Palmach, reinforced by Jewish veterans of the Royal Navy and the Jewish Agency's maritime and fishing departments. At the start of the 1948 Arab–Israeli War on May 15, its small makeshift fleet was no match for the Egyptian Navy, which had complete sea supremacy.

During the second truce of the 1948 Arab–Israeli War, between July 18 and October 15, 1948, the naval service's strength increased significantly, totaling 16 vessels of a combined 7,000 tons. This included four warships (of which only INS Wedgwood and INS Haganah were fit for naval combat) called "the Big Flotilla", three landing craft, three service ships and six patrol boats. New equipment was also installed on the ships in the Big Flotilla, including tactical radios. The Egyptian fleet had three large and eight small minesweepers, four armed service ships, three corvettes, at least four patrol boats and at least 20 landing craft. This fleet's composition had not changed since the beginning of the war.

The second truce started with an Israeli enclave in the Negev disconnected from the rest of the country. Military operations, including An-Far, Death to the Invader and GYS, to create a corridor between the two areas, failed. The Israeli political and military leadership therefore planned a massive operation, the largest undertaken by the IDF to that point. The operation was named The Ten Plagues (later renamed to Yoav), and involved the first major Israeli naval offensive campaign.

== Prelude ==
In Operation Yoav, the naval service was not supposed to, and could not, act independently. Rather, all of its actions were coordinated with ground forces and conducted in accordance with the latter's requirements. Its actions, almost entirely confined to the Gaza–Majdal corridor, were meant to create a naval blockade of the Egyptian expeditionary force in Israel (considering ground actions in the operation, this would translate into complete encirclement). This would be achieved by preventing any Egyptian naval actions in the area, including naval supply, reinforcement or seaborne evacuation of forces. In addition, the naval service would draw major Egyptian forces to the theater, preventing them from fighting in other areas where ground and air attacks would take place.

The Israeli naval service operated under the assumption that a concentrated attack on the Egyptians would force them to use their entire military arsenal for defense, and they would therefore not have offensive capabilities. In light of that, only the six patrol boats (INS Portzim, INS Palmach, INS Dror, INS Sa'ar, INS Galia and INS Tirtza) were designated to guard the Israeli coast.

The Egyptian Navy along the shore mainly operated out of Gaza and Majdal, both of which had open ports, making it particularly convenient to stage covert operations against them. Such operations were not planned, however. The Israeli strategy rested on searching for targets and devising a tactic to engage them once located. One joint operation with the Givati Brigade was planned—an attack on an Egyptian artillery battery in Isdud.

== Operations on October 15–18 ==
In the first days of Operation Yoav, the naval service did not meet with success. Their mission was to patrol the Gaza–Majdal area and engage any Egyptian ships whose location they could find, either through intelligence reports or visual identification. On October 16, 1948, the air force spotted an Egyptian vessel to the south of Gaza. The patrol boat INS Palmach took a sapper team to the location, but after reaching it at 02:15 on October 17, the crew failed to locate the ship. Another report on October 17 of two ships docking in Gaza similarly did not end in an engagement.

On October 18 at 04:00, the naval service shelled Gaza and on October 21, Majdal. Both operations were carried out in tandem with the Israeli Air Force. A shelling of al-Arish was also planned for October 18, but the Israeli ships turned to Majdal to look for a reported Egyptian vessel, which they did not find.

=== Operation Battery ===
Operation Battery was the name given to the amphibious assault planned by the naval service and Givati Brigade against an Egyptian artillery battery in Isdud. The naval service could not mount such an operation independently as its nascent marine force had been almost entirely destroyed in land combat in Operation Death to the Invader. Plans had to be changed as more infantry soldiers showed up than expected, and an actual landing craft was used instead of boats as planned. The landing craft's crew had no knowledge of the vessel's specifications and did not know how to properly operate it.

The vessel left Jaffa Port at 20:45 on October 16, followed by the patrol boat INS Sa'ar which carried the landing troops. They reached the destination at midnight, two hours late. Shortly after the 31 infantrymen embarked on the landing craft, its engine died. In addition, this was the first time that many of the Givati soldiers journeyed by sea, and most of them became seasick. The commander therefore decided to return to Jaffa. At 00:45, INS Sa'ar began towing the landing craft back (two hours later, the engine was restored), and at 06:30 the force was back in port.

== Battle near Majdal ==
Naval battle near Majdal
- Part of the 1948 Arab–Israeli War
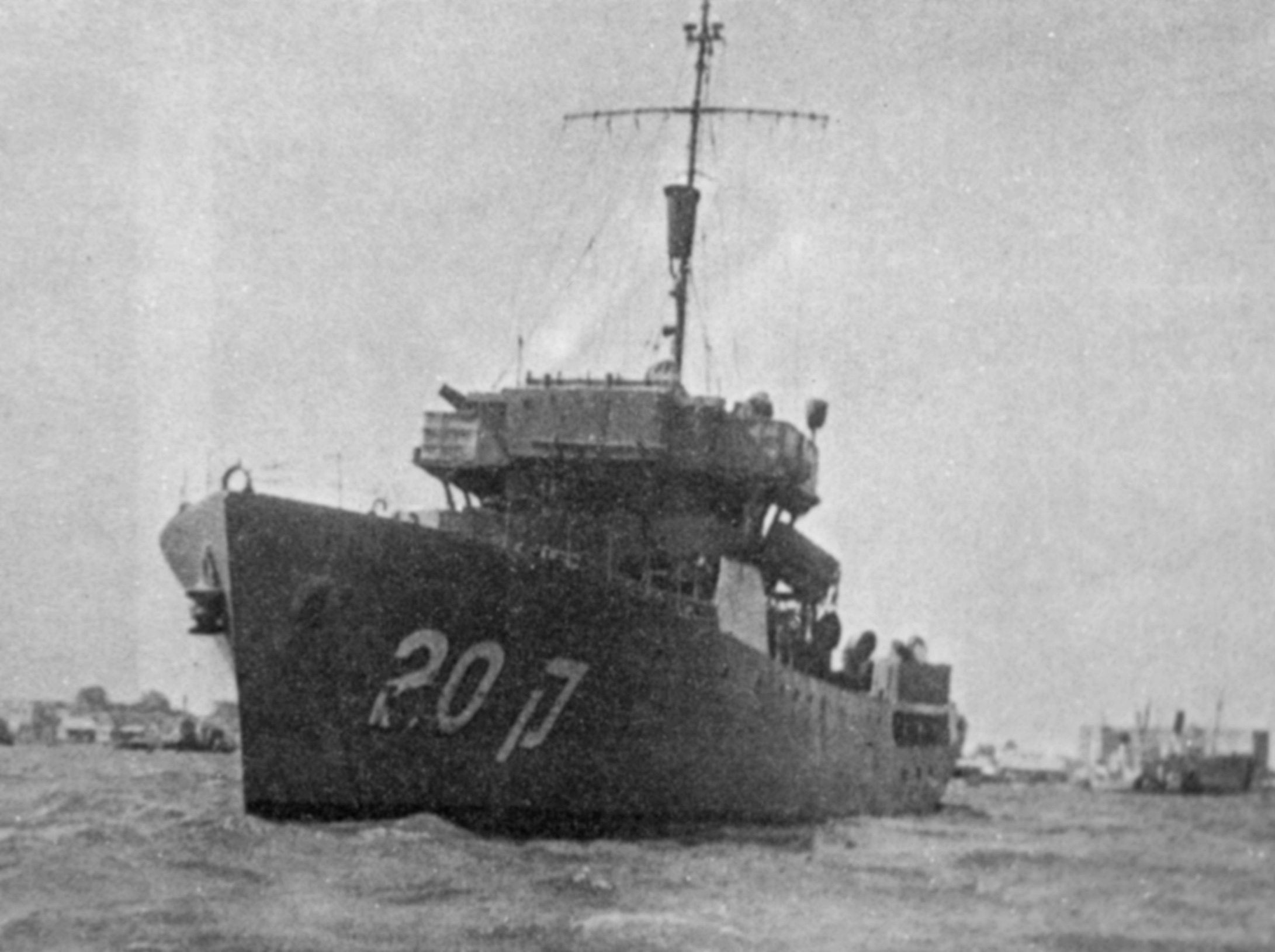
- INS Haganah
Date	October 19, 1948
Location	Waters of Israel/Palestine
Result	Inconclusive

Belligerents
Israel	Egypt

Commanders and leaders
(Israel) David Maimon (Haganah) (Israel) Aryeh Kaplan (Wedgwood) (Israel) Elyakim Epstein (Noga)	

Strength
Three warships	Corvette, three Spitfires

Casualties and losses
1 killed 5 wounded	1 aircraft shot down

=== Discovery and prelude ===
On October 18 at 22:45, intelligence reported that the Egyptian forces in Iraq al-Manshiyya ran out of fuel and required supplies. Other reports came on October 19 at 06:30 that the Egyptians would try to evacuate their wounded through the sea. The naval service therefore prepared to tighten its blockade of the shore, with the help of the air force. At 10:00 on October 19, a specific air force report pointed to an Egyptian vessel unloading cargo in Gaza.

At 10:10, when they received the intercept order, INS Wedgwood, INS Haganah and INS Noga were on a routine patrol about 15 nautical miles off the shore of Gaza. They moved south and at 10:25 turned to move closer to land and to Gaza. At 11:00, an Egyptian ship was spotted in Majdal, and at 11:21, after coming closer, discovered that it was a corvette unloading cargo and troops. It is unclear whether the ship had been in Majdal from the start, or if it had moved there from Gaza since the air force report.

The Israeli attack began on 12:03. The Israeli commander, David Maimon, ordered the ships to cross the T so that the starboard side of his ships would be facing the bow of the Egyptian vessel. At 12:25, INS Noga retreated, as it was armed only with 20 mm cannons which was considered insufficient for the battle.

=== Battle ===
At 12:29, it was attacked by an Egyptian Spitfire and returned fire, but the craft missed one another. Wedgwood and Haganah closed in on the shore, and at 12:30 opened fire on the Egyptian ship from a range of about 5,000 yards (4,600 m). Wedgwood stayed closer to the shore, with Haganah further at sea. At 12:38, the Egyptian corvette fired back, but missed. The Israeli ships hit and damaged it, which caused the corvette to start moving south.

Wedgwood had come dangerously close to the shore and ran the risk of running aground, and also blocked Haganah's field of fire. Therefore, Haganah initially stayed near Majdal while Wedgwood moved south to chase the corvette. At 12:52, Egyptian combat aircraft appeared on the scene, but did not engage the Israeli vessels. Both Haganah and Wedgwood exchanged fire with the Egyptian corvette but the Israeli cannons were of low quality and jammed frequently. They registered hits, but did not impair the corvette's ability to move or fire back. The corvette was also unable to do damage.

Egyptian Spitfires commenced bombing runs on Haganah, but dropped the bombs from a high altitude, allowing the ship to avoid most of them. The ship shot down one of the planes, which exploded near the surface of the water, damaging Haganah and injuring five of its crew members, one of whom died of his wounds half an hour later. Mordechai Limon, the deputy commander of Haganah and a future admiral, was among the wounded. By this time, Haganah's bow cannon had been disabled. In light of these developments, David Maimon ordered a retreat to Jaffa. Maimon also requested air support at the time of the Egyptian aerial attack. The Israeli command answered that it had sent aircraft to assist, but these did not arrive during the battle. Moreover, the command incorrectly believed that two Egyptian ships had been in the vicinity—a transport ship, according to earlier air reconnaissance, and a corvette.

Despite Maimon's order, Wedgwood continued chasing the Egyptian corvette while coming under fire from the aircraft. At 12:25, its bow cannon was damaged, and it turned and fired from the stern, then around again when the bow cannon was repaired. Haganah turned to assist Wedgwood, but at 13:40 the Egyptian coastal battery came online and started firing at Haganah. Haganah turned around again toward the open sea. Wedgwood was also hit by the shore artillery, suffering minor damage. At this point the corvette had gone out of range and Wedgwood began to retreat north, but Egyptian Spitfires attacked it, dropping three bombs, one of which wounded a crew member.

Both Israeli ships made it to Jaffa safely, but the port there could not undertake the repairs, so the ships sailed to Haifa. In all, they fired over 200 shells during the battle, few of which resulted in direct hits on the Egyptian corvette. The ships returned to active duty one day after the battle. On October 21, Wedgwood and Haganah conducted a skirmish with coastal batteries in Majdal. They began the attack at 06:40, in conjunction with an air force bombing raid, and retreated at 07:10.

== Sinking of Emir Farouk ==
=== Prelude ===
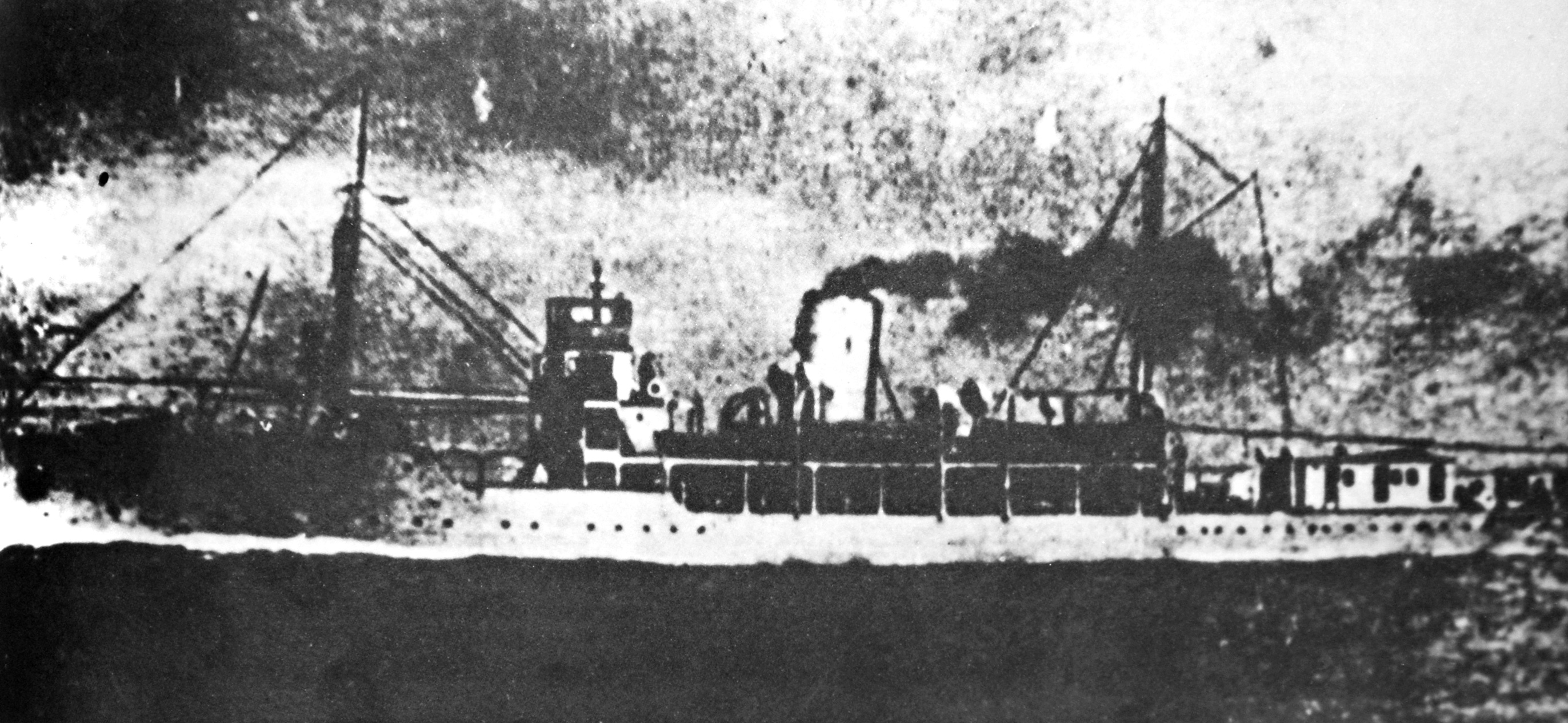
Emir Farouk

In March 1948, David Ben-Gurion ordered Ze'ev HaYam (literally, Sea Wolf), one of the main figures in Israel's early navy and merchant marine, to go to Italy to find ships that could be procured for the naval service. While Ze'ev HaYam procured two large motor boats and two landing craft, he wanted to acquire the Decima Flottiglia MAS's MT explosive motorboats that had been used in the Raid on Souda Bay to ram into and destroy larger ships. Ze'ev HaYam believed that these boats could turn the tide of the war. With the help of a relative and Ben-Gurion's consent, he bought six refurbished boats for $3,000 each from an ailing factory, and while the factory owners were told what the boats were for, to the outside they were disguised as racing boats.

In August 1948, the naval service's sabotage unit (officially, the Rescue Boat Unit), commanded by Yohai Bin-Nun and later transformed through merger into Shayetet 13, received the MT motorboats. The assembly and preparation of all the boats was not completed until the final days of Operation Yoav. The assembly of the boats, the training, and indeed the essence of the sabotage unit were so secret that even Paul Shulman, deputy commander of the naval service, was not in on it.

Boats of these type served the Italian Navy in World War II and proved effective against British targets, especially in the raid on Souda Bay. The method of operation was to load about 250 kilograms (550 lb) of explosives into the bow and ram into an enemy ship. The sole sailor, manning a detachable float, would eject about 100 m (330 ft) short of the target. Training on the first boats to arrive was done in the Sea of Galilee, with the Italian sailor Fiorenzo Capriotti teaching the Israelis how to use them. More training was done later near Jaffa.

The saboteurs themselves prepared four boats to be used in future operations. After believing that they could operate independently, but being proven wrong in the training, the naval service decided to store the boats in INS Ma'oz, due to its stern's construction and because Ma'oz had poor armament and could not be counted on in ship-to-ship combat. Contrary to the modus operandi for the Italian sabotage units on World War II, the Israelis sought to prevent its soldiers from being taken prisoner. Therefore, a special rescue boat was allocated to retrieve the saboteurs, leaving three actual sabotage boats. Bin Nun engineered a lasso-like belt that would be cast into the water by the rescue crew, the swimmer would put him arm into it, and be hauled onto the boat.

On October 22 at 16:10, two Egyptian ships were spotted off the Gaza coast—the flagship of the Egyptian Navy, Emir Farouk, and a BYMS-class minesweeper. The operation against them was preceded by a difficulty of obtaining permission to act. Gershon Zak, head of the naval service, and Paul Shulman, his deputy and head of the main flotilla, supported the operation, while chief of operations Yigael Yadin opposed, in light of an impending ceasefire and lack of prior experience with this method of warfare. The Israeli high command had issued an order to cease all attacks by 15:00 that day, and reiterated it at 17:30. Meanwhile, Paul Shulman, who was aboard one of the ships, repeatedly sent requests to Gershon Zak for the permission to attack. Zak appealed personally to David Ben-Gurion, who was concerned for the operation's chances. He consented in the end, by which time Shulman had told his soldiers that the attack would not be taking place. They were rousted again after official permission was granted at 18:10.

=== Operation ===
At 18:40, INS Ma'oz detached from the rest of the flotilla and sailed to a spot 7 nautical miles (13 km; 8.1 mi) northwest of Gaza. The spot was calculated based on the ship's ability to intercept fleeing Egyptian vessels by sailing south, and the expected light projection during such an encounter (the moonlight would reveal the Egyptian forces while hiding the Israeli). Additionally, the ship was ordered to stay put in its location, so that despite its camouflage, the returning Israeli sailors would be able to find it. However, it turned out that Ma'oz went further south than it was supposed to.

Ma'oz released its five boats at 21:10, and by 22:00, the boats were in close proximity to the Egyptian vessels. Two of the boats, manned by Ya'akov Vardi and Zalman Abramov, were intended for the actual sabotage, one as a reserve, manned by the commander Yohai Bin-Nun, and one to collect the commandos after the operation, manned by Yitzhak Brockman and Ya'akov Reitov. The Israeli sailors used helmets with infrared lights to ease the extraction process. The Egyptian ships, believing that a ceasefire was already in effect, had their lights on and were easy to spot. Despite this, according to a later Israeli estimate, they had been on full alert. Because the Egyptian ships were facing one another, Bin-Nun decided that Abramov and Vardi would attack the bows of Emir Farouk and the minesweeper, respectively. This would make it more difficult for the Egyptians to fire at the boats should they have spotted them, because they could hit each other.

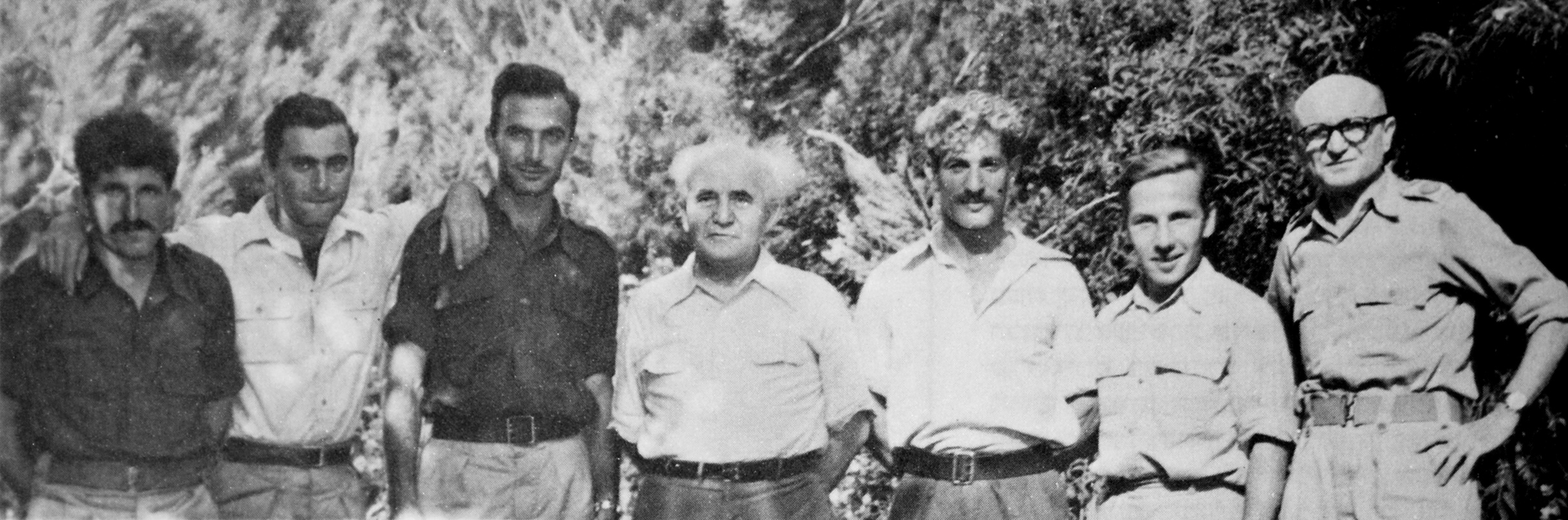
The sabotage team and Ben-Gurion. From left to right: Zalman Abramov, Yohai Bin-Nun, Ya'akov Reitov, David Ben-Gurion (PM/MoD), Ya'akov Vardi, Yitzhak Brockman, Ya'akov Dori (CoS)

While the Israelis were preparing, the two ships started moving: Emir Farouk went north and the minesweeper went south. This hastened the Israeli attack. Abramov's boat attacked first, causing the Egyptians to fire at random. Vardi's boat mistakenly turned to attack Emir Farouk as well. Vardi failed to eject due to a technical difficulty, but managed to turn around and strike again. In the dark, Abramov believed that Vardi's was the extraction boat and caught on, but detached from it as well before it rammed into the Egyptian ship. Vardi's actions also confused Yitzhak Brockman on the rescue boat, who had been moving toward Emir Farouk, and now believed that Vardi was turning around to collect Abramov. Brockman therefore started moving in Bin-Nun's direction.

Emir Farouk sank in about five minutes. Yohai Bin-Nun, who was in the reserve boat, noticed the mistake made by Vardi, and himself rammed the minesweeper. He was spotted and fired at, and managed to eject from his boat only 40 m (130 ft) short of the target. The minesweeper suffered significant damage, but did not sink and was hauled back to Alexandria. It was subsequently scrapped by the Egyptian Navy. Egyptian coastal artillery opened a barrage on the general area, but did not spot their targets. The extraction boat collected the commandos and remained in the area to assess the damage, estimating about 200–300 Egyptian survivors. At 22:25 it started moving toward where it believed Ma'oz was. The commandos, despite spotting it from a very close range, found Ma'oz closer than they had thought, and by 23:10 all the commandos were back on the ship.

=== Aftermath ===
The operation achieved the element of surprise, as the Egyptians were unaware that Israel was employing explosive boats. On the Israeli side, the action was top-secret and unknown to the media. INS Ma'oz stayed at sea for three days to cover its tracks. The operation strengthened the notion that the Israeli navy could not be solely a conventional one, and had instead to incorporate naval commandos and other small weapon systems as an integral part of its doctrine.

For his exploits, Yohai Bin-Nun received the Hero of Israel citation, and the commando crew was invited to lunch by David Ben-Gurion. Bin-Nun remained with the Israel Navy after its founding and went on to hold various command positions until becoming chief of the navy in 1960. The operation strengthened his belief that it was possible and preferable to defeat superior numbers and weaponry with cheap but unconventional warfare. During his naval career, he worked to develop doctrines and technologies in accordance with these beliefs.

== Footnotes ==
1. a: According to Eliezer Tal, INS Noga that spotted the ship, while according to Wallach et al., it was INS Haganah.
2. b: According to Eliezer Tal, the attack started at 12:02
3. c: Not to be confused with David Maimon, another Israeli military commander and general

== Bibliography ==
- Eldar, Mike (1993). Flotilla 13 (in Hebrew). Ma'ariv Book Guild.
- Goodman, Hirsch; Mann, Shlomo (1982). "Navy". IDF in its Corps: Army and Security Encyclopedia (in Hebrew). Vol. 10. Revivim Publishing.
- Lorch, Netanel (1998). History of the War of Independence (in Hebrew). Modan Publishing.
- Morris, Benny (2008). 1948: The First Arab–Israeli War. Yale University Press. ISBN 978-0-300-15112-1.
- Tal, Eliezer (1964). Naval Operations in the War of Independence (in Hebrew). Ma'arakhot Publishing.
- Wallach, Jehuda, ed. (1978). "Security". Carta's Atlas of Israel (in Hebrew). Vol. First Years 1948–1961. Carta Jerusalem.
