= Solomon (name) =

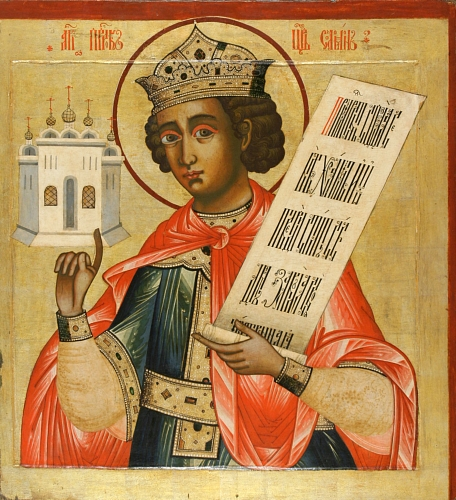
- Russian icon of King Solomon
- Pronunciation: /ˈsɒləmən/
- Gender: Male

Origin
- Origin: Hebrew
- Meaning: "Peaceful"

Other names
- Alternative spelling: Salomon
- Related names: Suleiman, Suliman, Sulayman, Salomão, Shlomo, Soghomon, Zalman

Solomon is a masculine given name and surname of Hebrew origin, popularized by the biblical figure Solomon, Israelite monarch and son of David. The name is derived from the Latin Solomōn, borrowed from the Ancient Greek Solomṓn (Σολομών), ultimately from the Hebrew Šĕlōmō (שְׁלֹמֹה). It is derived from the Semitic root Š-L-M (ש-ל-ם), which translates to "whole, complete" which is also the basis of the word Shalom (שָׁלוֹם, lit. 'peace').

== Single name ==
- Solomon (exilarch), ruled the Diaspora Jewish community 730–761
- Solomon (magister militum) (480s/490s–544), Byzantine eunuch general, governor of Africa
- Solomon, Count of Cerdanya and Urgell (died c. 869)
- Solomon of Hungary (1053–1087)
- Solomon I (1735–1784)
- Solomon II (1772–1815)
- Solomon of Montpellier, 13th-century Rabbi
- Solomon (pianist) (1902–1988), the professional name of the British pianist Solomon Cutner
- Solomon (rapper) (born 1991), American electronic hip-pop recording artist

== Given name ==
- Solomon Alabi, Nigerian basketball player
- Solomon Ashley (1690–1775), English politician
- Solomon Dias Bandaranaika (1862–1946), Sri Lankan Maha Mudaliyar
- Solomon West Ridgeway Dias Bandaranaika (1899–1959), Prime Minister of Sri Lanka from 1956 to 1959
- Solomon Scott Beck (1883–1944), American politician from Maryland
- Solomon Berihu (born 1999), Ethiopian distance runner
- Solomon Brannan (born 1942), American football player
- Solomon Busendich (born 1984), Kenyan long-distance runner
- Solomon Burke (1940–2010), American recording artist
- Solomon Byrd (born 1999), American football player
- Solomon S. Calhoon (1838–1908), justice of the Supreme Court of Mississippi
- Solomon Barnett Chyte, birth name of Sydney Kyte (1896–1981), British bandleader
- Solomon Elimimian (born 1986), American football player
- Solomon Fernando (1850–1915), Sri Lankan physician and community leader
- Solomon Ferris (c. 1748–1803), British naval officer
- Solomon S. Fleming (1812–1901), American politician and merchant
- Solomon kaDinuzulu (1891–1933), king of the Zulu nation from 1913 until 1933
- Solomon Ilori (born c. 1934), Nigerian drummer and percussionist
- Solomon Kindley (born 1997), American football player
- Sol Lesser (1890–1980), American film producer
- Solomon Luna (1858–1912), American rancher and banker
- Solomon Machover (1906–1976), American psychologist
- Solomon P. McCurdy (1820–1890), justice of the Supreme Court of the Utah Territory
- Solomon Northup (1808 – c. 1863), American abolitionist and author
- Solomon Rose (born c. 1987), English electronic musician
- Solomon Christoffel Obeyesekere (1848–1927), Sri Lankan Sinhala lawyer and legislator
- Park Solomon (born 1999), stage name Lomon, Uzbek-born South Korean actor
- Solomon Shereshevsky (1886–1958), Russian journalist
- Sol Stern (1935–2025), American author
- Solomon Sufrin (1881–1931), American politician
- Solomon Thomas (born 1995), American football player
- Solomon Trujillo (born 1951), American businessman
- Sol Wachtler (born 1930), former Chief Judge of the New York Court of Appeals
- Solomon Feferman (1928–2016), American mathematician

=== Middle name ===
- Sujay Solomon Sutherson, Singaporean convicted killer (1980–2022)

== Surname ==
- Abraham Solomon (1823–1862), British painter
- Ada Solomon (born 1968), Romanian film producer
- Albert Solomon (1876–1914), Australian politician, premier of Tasmania
- Anthony M. Solomon (1919–2008), American Treasury undersecretary and president of the Federal Reserve Board of New York
- Anu Solomon (born 1996), American football player
- Barbara Probst Solomon (1928–2019), American author and journalist
- Charles "King" Solomon (1884–1933), Russian-born mob boss of Boston
- Charles J. Solomon (1906–1975), American bridge player
- Clinton Solomon (born 1983), American football player
- Daisy Solomon (1882–1978), South African / British suffragette
- David Solomon (artist) (born 1976), American painter
- David Solomon (TV producer) (born 1962), American television director and producer
- David Solomon (writer), Australian educator, scholar, editor, translator and writer
- David Henry Solomon (born 1929), Australian polymer chemist
- David M. Solomon (born 1962), American investment banker
- Dean Solomon (born 1980), Australian footballer
- Duane Solomon (born 1984), American middle distance runner
- Edward I. Solomon (born 1946), Stanford University chemistry professor
- Emanuel Solomon (1800–1875), pioneer of South Australia
- Frances-Anne Solomon (born 1966), English-Caribbean-Canadian filmmaker, writer, producer, and distributor
- Freddie Solomon (1953–2012), American football player
- Georgiana Solomon (1844–1933) Scottish / South African educator and suffragette
- George Solomon (born c.1940), American sportswriter
- Gerald Solomon (1930–2001), American politician
- Grant Solomon (born 1995), American tennis player
- Gustave Solomon (1930–1996), American mathematician and engineer
- Harold Solomon (born 1952), American tennis player
- Haym Solomon (1740–1785), financier of the U.S. in the Revolutionary War
- Ikey Solomon (1785–1850), English criminal
- Jacques Solomon (1908–1942), French physicist and Marxist
- Jared Solomon (baseball) (born 1997), American baseball player
- Jared Solomon (Maryland politician) (born 1985), American politician
- Jared Solomon (Pennsylvania politician) (born 1979), American politician
- Javon Solomon (born 2001), American football player
- Jeff Solomon (born 1957), assistant general manager of the Anaheim Ducks
- Jesse Solomon, American football player
- Jewel Solomon, American tech entrepreneur and venture capitalist
- Jimmie Lee Solomon (1956–2020), American lawyer and Major League Baseball executive
- Joe Solomon (1930–2023), Guyanese cricketer
- John R. Solomon (1910–1985), Canadian politician
- Josh Solomon, guitar player and lead singer of the band Josh and the Empty Pockets
- Kimberley Solomon, birth name of Kimberly Quinn (born 1961), American journalist, commentator, and magazine publisher
- Laura Solomon (1974–2019), New Zealand novelist, playwright and poet
- Lawrence Solomon, Canadian writer
- Linda Solomon, American music critic and editor
- Malia Solomon (1915–2005), American artist
- Manor Solomon (born 1999), Israeli international association footballer
- Martin K. Solomon, American computer scientist
- Martin M. Solomon (born 1950), American politician, New York state senator and Supreme Court judge
- Maynard Solomon, American psychologist, music producer, and writer
- Morris Solomon Jr., American serial killer
- Mose Solomon (1900–1966), American rabbi and baseball player
- Moss Judah Solomon (1843–1933), businessman in South Australia
- Norman Solomon, American author and media critic
- Peggy Solomon (1909–1995), American bridge player
- Peter J. Solomon (born 1938), American investment banker
- Peter Solomon (baseball) (born 1996), American baseball player
- Reanna Solomon (1981–2022), Nauruan Olympic weightlifter
- Reginald Louis Solomon (1877–1939), Australian publisher
- Richard Solomon (disambiguation), multiple people
- Rivers Solomon, American science fiction author
- Robert Solomon (disambiguation), multiple people
- Rosalind Fox Solomon (1930–2025), American photographer
- Russ Solomon, American founder of Tower Records
- Sam Solomon, pseudonym of a British author
- Samuel Moss Solomon (1769–1842), early settler in Australia, many notable descendants
- Saul Solomon (1817–1892), Cape Colony politician
- Saul Solomon (photographer) (1836–1929), English-born Australian photographer
- Saul Solomon (judge) (1875–1960), South African judge
- Shalonda Solomon, American sprinter
- Sheldon Solomon, American social psychologist, co-developer of terror management theory
- Shirley Solomon, Canadian television talk show host
- Simeon Solomon, British Pre-Raphaelite painter
- Solomon Joseph Solomon, British Pre-Raphaelite painter
- Stacey Solomon (born 1989), British singer, television presenter, and model
- Steven Solomon (born 1993), Australian Olympic sprinter
- Suniti Solomon (1938 or 1939–2015), Indian physician and microbiologist
- Susan Solomon (born 1956), American atmospheric chemist, MIT faculty
- Tupe Solomon-Tanoa'i, New Zealand diplomat
- Vaiben Solomon (c. 1800–1860), Australian businessman
- Vaiben Louis Solomon (1853–1908), first mayor of Darwin and 21st premier of South Australia
- Virgil Solomon (1894–1972), Romanian physician and politician
- Vonzell Solomon, American singer
- Will Solomon (born 1978), American basketball player

== Fictional characters ==
- Alfie Solomons, in the British period crime drama Peaky Blinders
- Dick Solomon, in the television sitcom 3rd Rock from the Sun
- Sally Solomon, in the television sitcom 3rd Rock from the Sun
- Solomon Kane, lead character in some Robert E. Howard short stories
- Harry Solomon, in the television sitcom 3rd Rock from the Sun
- Tommy Solomon (3rd Rock from the Sun), in the television sitcom 3rd Rock from the Sun
- Solomon Grundy (character), a villain in DC Comics comic books and TV series
- Solomon Grundy (nursery rhyme), a nursery rhyme character

== See also ==
- Solomon (disambiguation)
- Salamon (disambiguation)
- Salman (name)
- Salmon (surname)
- Sol (given name)
- Solomons (disambiguation)
- Zalman (name)
