= USS Cythera (PY-31) =

Patrol vessel of the United States Navy

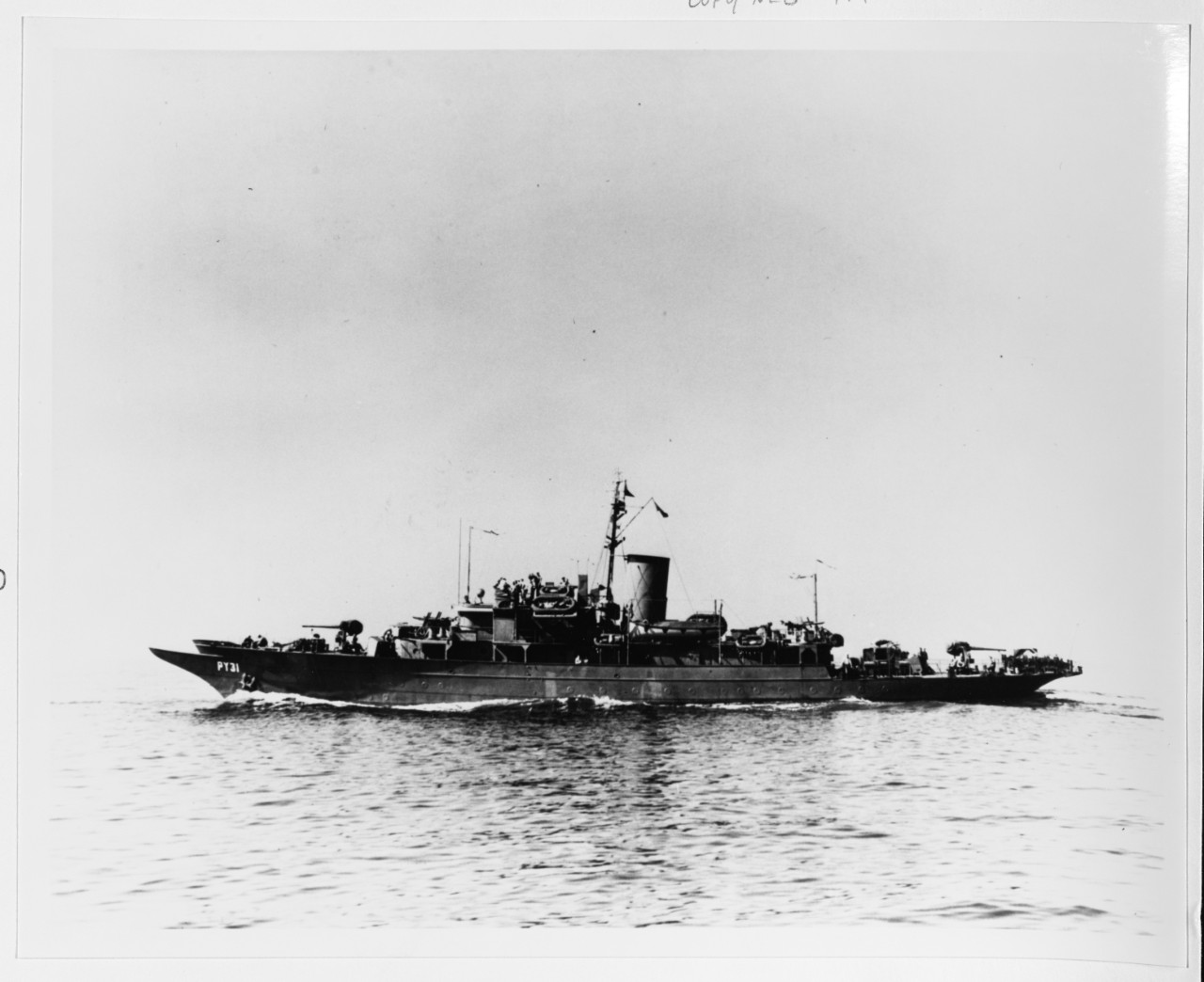
- USS Cythera (PY-31) on 10 November 1943.

History

Flag unknown
- Name: Argosy
- Builder: Germania Werft, Kiel, Germany
- Completed: 1931
- Renamed: Vita
- Renamed: Abril
- Fate: Sold to U.S. Navy 14 July 1942

United States Navy
- Name: USS Cythera (PY-31)
- Namesake: Cythera, one of the Ionian Islands
- Acquired: 14 July 1942
- Commissioned: 26 October 1942
- Decommissioned: 3 January 1944
- In service: 3 January 1944 (non-commissioned)
- Out of service: 14 March 1946
- Fate: Transferred to U.S. Maritime Commission for disposal 6 November 1946; Sold late 1946

Flag unknown
- Name: Abril
- Owner: Tyre Shipping Company
- Operator: Irgun Zvai Leumi
- In service: 1946
- Renamed: Ben Hecht
- Namesake: Ben Hecht (1894–1964), American screenwriter, director, producer, playwright, journalist, novelist, and Zionist
- Fate: Captured 8 March 1947

Israeli Navy
- Name: INS Ma'oz (K 24)
- Commissioned: September 1948
- Fate: Sold 1956
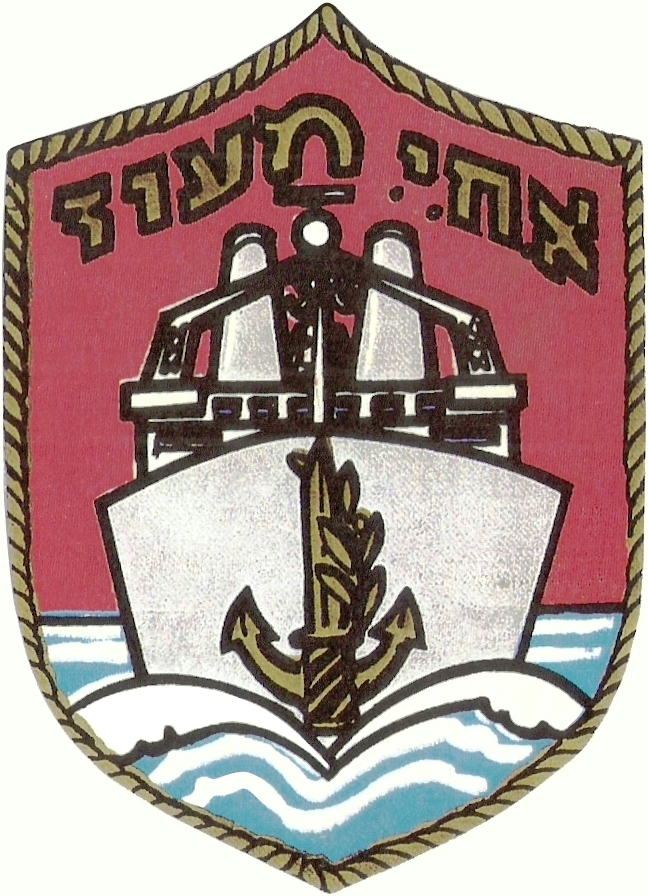
- Badge

Flag unknown
- Name: Abril
- In service: 1956

Italy
- Name: Santa Maria del Mare
- Fate: Sold 2008
- Name: Rossy One
- Status: Active as private luxury yacht 2009

General characteristics as U.S. Navy vessel
- Type: Patrol vessel
- Displacement: 800 tons (full-load)
- Length: 205 ft 7 in (62.66 m)
- Beam: 30 ft (9.1 m)
- Draft: 10 ft 10 in (3.3 m)
- Propulsion: 2 × 1,800 bhp (1,342 kW) Atlas or 2 × 2,060 bhp (1,536 kW) Krupp diesel engines, two shafts
- Speed: 15 knots
- Complement: 74
- Armament: 1 × 3-inch (76.2 mm)/50-caliber gun; 4 × 20 mm cannon

The second USS Cythera (PY-31) was a United States Navy patrol vessel in commission from 1942 to 1944 and in non-commissioned service from 1944 to 1946. She also served in the Israeli Navy as INS Ma'oz (K 234) from 1948 to 1956.

In addition to naval service, the vessel operated as the blockade runner Ben Hecht to smuggle Jewish refugees into Mandatory Palestine, as a civilian yacht under various names, and as a ferry in Italy.

== Service history ==
=== 1931–1942 ===
Germania Werft at Kiel, Germany, built the ship in 1931 as the 753-gross register ton civilian luxury yacht Argosy for Charles A. Stone of the stock-brokerage firm Hayden, Stone & Co. As originally designed, she had accommodations for 15 passengers and a crew of 20. Thomas Sopwith purchased her in 1934, renamed her Vita, and used her to shadow his J-class yacht Endeavour during the 1934 America's Cup race. She later was renamed Abril and used to smuggle arms to the Spanish Republican Armed Forces in Spain during the Spanish Civil War of 1936–1939.

=== U.S. Navy ===
The U.S. Navy purchased the ship on 14 July 1942, for use as a patrol vessel during World War II. She was commissioned as USS Cythera (PY-31) on 26 October 1942.

Assigned to the Gulf Sea Frontier, Cythera conducted exercises for the Small Craft Training Center at Miami, Florida, and escorted convoys to Galveston, Texas, and Guantanamo Bay, Cuba, until 16 March 1943, when she departed Key West, Florida, bound for New York City, which she reached on 21 March 1943. Assigned to the Eastern Sea Frontier, she escorted convoys between New York City and ports in the southern United States until 22 September 1943.

Reassigned to the 3rd Naval District, Cythera moved to New London, Connecticut, on 22 December 1943, for duty with the Underwater Sound Laboratory. On 3 January 1944, she was decommissioned and placed in non-commissioned service. She conducted training exercises for submarines and was engaged in experimental sonar operations from her base at New London.

Several experimental versions of the developing commutated rotation (CR) scanning sonar with combined scanning and searchlight modes and a later vertical scanning system were installed on the ship for testing.

On 18 January 1945 Cythera departed for Port Everglades, Florida, where she arrived on 23 January 1945, to serve with the Antisubmarine Development Operational Detachment of the United States Atlantic Fleet. She conducted experimental operations with submarines until 24 April 1945.

From 29 April to 12 November 1945, Cythera was at New London for overhaul and training operations with submarines. After a voyage to Key West, she returned to New London on 28 November 1945, and remained there until arriving at New York City on 30 January 1946. She was placed out of service on 14 March 1946, and transferred to the United States Maritime Commission on 6 November 1946, for disposal.

=== Zionist service ===
Later in 1946 the Tyre Shipping Company – a shell company organized to hold nominal title to her by the Bergsin Group, also known as the "Bergson Boys," a group of Irgun Zvai Leumi Zionist activists led by Hillel Kook, also known as Peter Bergson — purchased her from the United States Government for US$36,400, using funds raised by the 1946 Ben Hecht play A Flag Is Born. The group renamed the 753-gross register ton vessel MS Abril and funded an overhaul of her in the Gowanus Canal in Brooklyn, New York, that cost over US$100,000.

Former United States Army Air Forces Brigadier General Elliott Roosevelt, an experienced yachtsman who was the son of the late President Franklin D. Roosevelt and Eleanor Roosevelt, volunteered to serve as Abril′s captain, but withdrew his offer because of his mother's objections. With a crew consisting of 19 American volunteers and two paid Norwegian engineers, Abril departed New York City on 27 December 1946, made a rough midwinter crossing of the North Atlantic Ocean during which her starboard engine broke down, and arrived six days behind schedule at Port de Bouc on the Mediterranean coast of France near Marseille on 10 January 1947. There she underwent further modification to allow her to carry 600 Jewish refugees on a blockade running voyage to Mandatory Palestine, including the installation of toilets overhanging her sides so she could accommodate a large number of men on her deck. Sponsored by the Irgun, she was the only ship engaged in illegally transporting Jewish refugees to Mandatory Palestine that was not sponsored by the Mossad Aliyah Bet branch of Haganah.

The refugees arrived in Marseille on 28 February 1947, and on 1 March 1947 Ben Hecht got underway from Port de Bouc with 597, 600, or "over 600" passengers (sources disagree) and a crew of 27 aboard, expecting to arrive off Palestine on the evening of 7 March. After departing Port de Bouc, she was renamed MS Ben Hecht. Plans called for small boats to meet her off the coast of Palestine and take her passengers to shore, allowing Ben Hecht to return to Europe to pick up more refugees. The Irgun planned to make diversionary attacks on British facilities in Palestine on the evening of 7 March 1947, to distract British forces while Ben Hecht approached Palestine and enhance her chances of reaching the coast and discharging her passengers undetected. In the event British forces captured her, her crew members planned to remain separate from the passengers so that the British would arrest the crew, unlike the practice on Haganah-sponsored ships, whose crews mixed in with passengers to try to avoid arrest. Because the crew members almost all were Americans, the Irgun believed that their arrest would force the British to put them on trial, providing the Zionist movement a forum in which to argue that Jewish immigration to Palestine was legal because it fulfilled the League of Nations mandate to create a Jewish homeland in Palestine.

An hour after sunrise on 2 March 1947, Ben Hecht′s port engine broke down when its piston oil-pump rod punched a hole in a crankcase while the ship was passing through a narrow channel through an uncleared minefield. If the unreliable starboard engine also broke down, Ben Hecht faced the danger of drifting out of the channel and striking a mine. After rejecting an order to return to Port de Bouc, her crew, reasoning that returning was as dangerous as proceeding, made emergency repairs allowing the engine to operate at reduced speed and continued the voyage. A breakdown in communications ensued: Ben Hecht′s radiomen were unable to inform the Irgun that the delay for repairs and Ben Hecht′s subsequent reduced speed meant that she would arrive off Palestine on 8 March instead of 7 March; meanwhile, the Irgun had rescheduled its diversionary attacks for the evening of 8 March, but Irgun-trained Betar members aboard Ben Hecht to escort the refugees failed to inform Ben Hecht′s crew of the change in the Irgun's plans, and Ben Hecht arrived off Palestine on 8 March before the Irgun attacks began.

British intelligence had monitored Ben Hecht since her overhaul in Brooklyn. At 10:40 on 8 March 1947, a British Royal Air Force Avro Lancaster maritime patrol aircraft sighted her in the Mediterranean Sea as she approached Palestine. The British Royal Navy destroyer HMS Chieftain intercepted her at 12:15, and at 14:15 the British destroyer HMS Chevron came up along Ben Hecht′s starboard side. Ben Hecht′s crew requested food and water from the destroyers, one of which demanded to know her identity and destination. Ben Hecht, steering a westward course toward Gibraltar to deceive the British, responded that she was bound for Arica, Chile. The British destroyer HMS Chivalrous and anti-aircraft frigate HMS St Brides Bay also arrived on the scene as Ben Hecht alternated between steering toward Gibraltar and the Suez Canal.

At 16:30 on 8 March 1947, as twilight approached, the destroyers maneuvered to block Ben Hecht′s path 10 nautical miles (19 km; 12 mi) off the coast of Palestine. With only one day of food left aboard, Ben Hecht turned 90 degrees to make for the coast of Palestine. When a destroyer again demanded Ben Hecht′s identity and destination, her crew replied that she was the merchant ship Abril bound for Chile. However, Ben Hecht clearly was steering for Palestine and, with their ship surrounded by British warships and unable to escape, Ben Hecht′s crew hoisted the Zionist flag, and Betar members threw their weapons overboard and led the passengers in singing the Zionist anthem "Hatikvah" and the anthem of the Zionist Revisionist Party. Chieftain came alongside Ben Hecht, put a 32-man boarding party of Royal Marines aboard her, and rammed her. Thirty more Marines from Chevron and 20 from Chivalrous also boarded Ben Hecht. Armed with gas grenades, batons, javelins, and water hoses, the Marines faced no resistance and took full control of Ben Hecht about an hour after boarding. They held her passengers below deck and her crew under guard in a corner of her bridge.

The British towed Ben Hecht into the harbor at Haifa in Mandatory Palestine during the predawn hours of 9 March 1947. Her crew was arrested and imprisoned, and her passengers were placed in British Army custody and deported to prison camps in Cyprus.

=== Israeli Navy ===
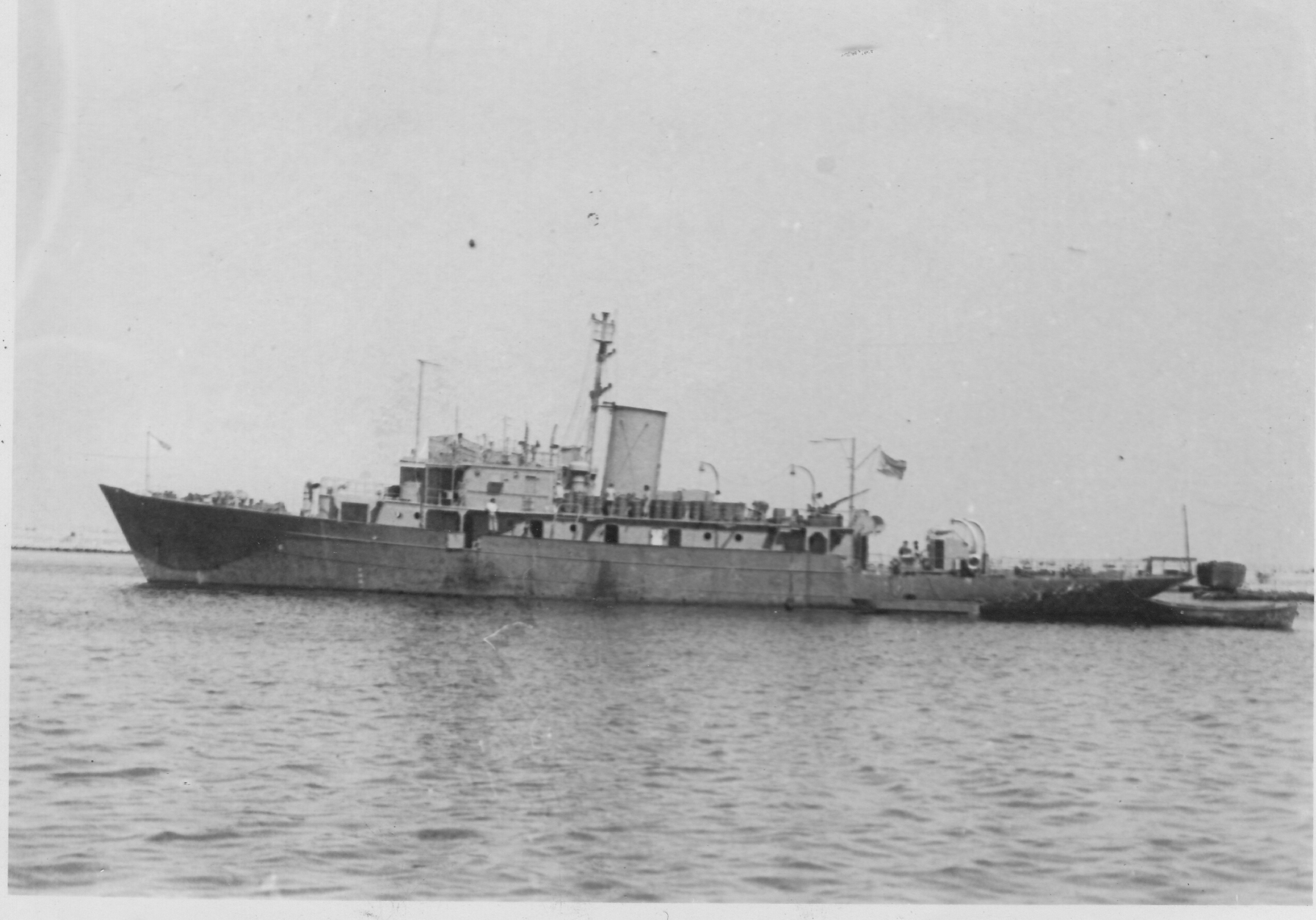
INS Ma'oz (K 24) in 1948.

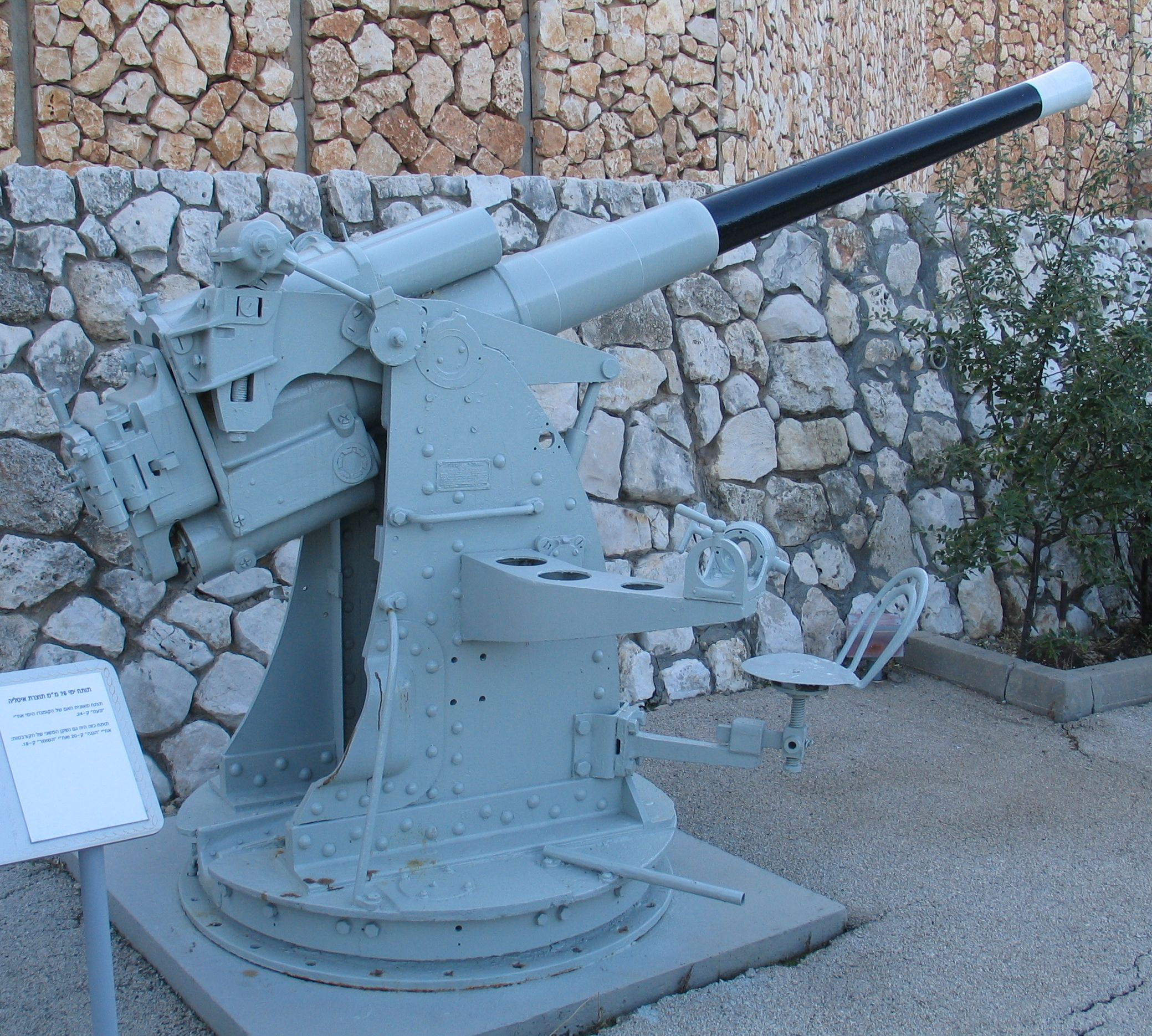
An Italian-made 76-mm gun from INS Ma'oz (K 24) on display in the Clandestine Immigration and Naval Museum at Haifa, Israel.

In 1948, the ship was converted into a mother ship for Italian-made MT explosive motorboats, and she entered service in the Israeli Navy as INS Ma'oz (K 24) in September 1948 during the 1948 Arab–Israeli War.

Ma'oz was in the Mediterranean Sea as part of a patrol off the Gaza Strip on 22 October 1948, during Operation Yoav when two Egyptian Navy ships – the sloop El Amir Farouq, which was the Egyptian Navy's flagship, and a BYMS-class minesweeper — were reported off the Gaza coast at 16:10. After receiving permission at 18:10 to attack the ships, she detached from the patrol at 18:40 and proceeded to a position 7 nautical miles (13 km; 8.1 mi) northwest of Gaza City. After sighting the Egyptian ships, she immediately launched four boats at 22:10 – three explosive motorboats, one to attack each ship and the third as a reserve, and a rescue boat to pick up the naval commandos operating the boats after the attack. The boats steered under the cover of darkness toward the Egyptian ships, which were under the misimpression that a ceasefire was in effect and were operating with their lights on, although the Israelis later assessed the Egyptian crews were on high alert. In close proximity to the Egyptian ships by 22:00, the commandos set their explosive charges and jumped overboard. Two boats attacked El Amir Farouq, and a column of water from one explosion rose 150 feet (46 m) above her. The reserve boat attacked the minesweeper. Both ships opened fire, but ineffectively. El Amir Farouq already had taken on a serious list, and she sank by the stern in four or five minutes. The badly damaged minesweeper remained afloat under a pall of smoke; the Egyptians towed her into port and later scrapped her after deeming her beyond economical repair.

In 1956, after the Suez Crisis of October–November 1956, the Israeli Navy sold Ma'oz to an Israel businessman.

=== Later service ===
After her sale, the vessel was renamed Abril. The Italian company Navigazione Libera di Golfo later acquired her, renamed her Santa Maria del Mare, and placed her in service as a ferry in the Gulf of Naples.

Santa Maria del Mare was sold in 2008. She was refitted, repainted, refurbished, and converted into a luxury private yacht and offered for sale for 15,000,000 euros. She later was renamed Rossy One. She was in active service as of 2009.
