= HMCS Beauharnois =

Several units of the Royal Canadian Navy that have been named HMCS Beauharnois.

- HMCS Beauharnois (K662) (I), a River-class frigate renamed Prestonian before commissioning, that served in the Battle of the Atlantic during the Second World War.
- HMCS Beauharnois (K540) (II), a Flower-class corvette that served in the Battle of the Atlantic during the Second World War.

== Battle honours ==
- Atlantic, 1944–45
