= Better Call Saul (disambiguation) =

Better Call Saul is an American television series.

It may also refer to:

- "Better Call Saul" (Breaking Bad), an episode of Breaking Bad
- "Better Call Saul" (Homeland), an episode of Homeland

== See also ==
- Saul (disambiguation)
- Breaking Bad (disambiguation)
