= Mordechai Limon =

Israeli Navy Commander

- מרדכי לימון
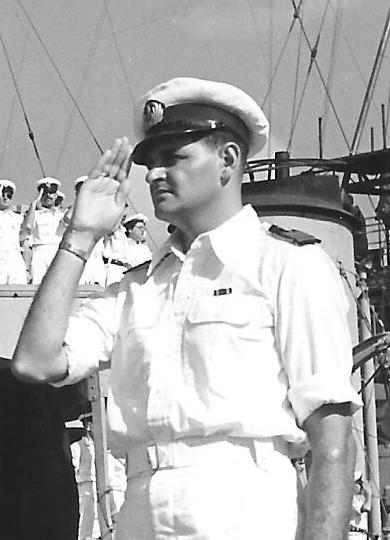
- Born: January 3, 1924; Baranavichy, Nowogródek Voivodeship, Second Polish Republic
- Died: May 16, 2009 (aged 85); New York City, New York, United States
- Military career
- Allegiance: Israel
- Branch: Israeli Navy
- Service years: 1940–1954
- Rank: Aluf
- Commands: Commander of the Israeli Navy
- Conflicts: World War II; 1947–1949 Palestine war

Mordechai Limon (Hebrew: מרדכי לימון; January 3, 1924 – May 15, 2009) was the fourth commander of the Israeli Navy, serving from December 14, 1950, until July 1, 1954.

Limon was born in Baranavichy, then in Poland, and moved to Mandatory Palestine with his family in 1932. He grew up in Tel Aviv and joined the Hashomer Hatzair youth movement.

During World War II, Limon joined the Palmach before enlisting in the British Merchant Navy. He served on ships participating in the Arctic convoys as well as in the Pacific and Far East. After the war, Limon captained three vessel transporting Jews that wanted to emigrate from Europe to Mandatory Palestine from France as part of Aliyah Bet. One reported crossing carried Shraga Weil and Eli Reismann, then members of Hashomer Hatzair. He also joined the Palyam after its establishment. During the 1948 Arab-Israeli War, Limon served in the Israeli Navy as second-in-command of the INS Haganah and was wounded in an Egyptian air attack on the ship in October 1948. After taking a few weeks to recover from his injuries, he returned to service and became Captain of the INS Wedgwood.

Limon oversaw the Cherbourg Project that involved smuggling five missile boats that had originally been purchased by Israel and embargoed by France. He would be subsequently expelled from France. His daughter, Nili Limon (born 1951), is married to Nathaniel Robert de Rothschild, son of Élie de Rothschild.
