= Saul (given name) =

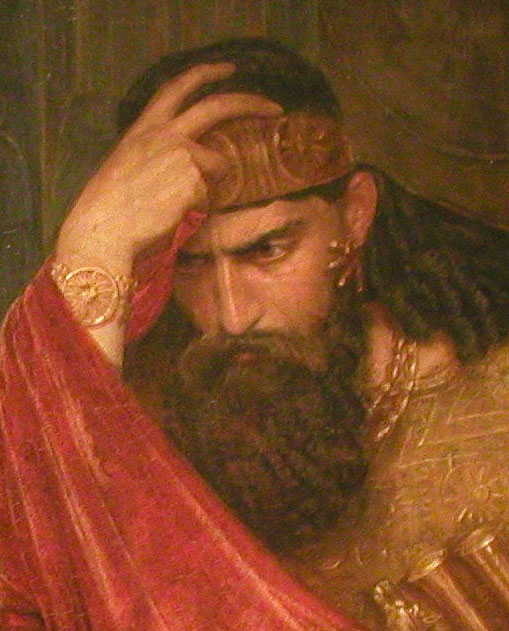
- Saul from the Hebrew Bible
- Pronunciation: /ˈsɔːl/ Spanish: [saˈul]
- Gender: Male

Origin
- Origin: Hebrew
- Meaning: borrowed
- Region of origin: Judea

Other names
- Related names: Shaul, Saulo

Saul is a masculine given name of Hebrew origin. It is the English form of שָׁאוּל, the Hebrew name of the Biblical King Saul. The name translates to "asked for/borrowed".

People named Saul include:

- Saul Adadi (1850–1918), Sephardic Hakham and rosh yeshiva in the Tripoli Jewish community
- Saul Alinsky (1909–1972), American political activist
- Saúl Álvarez (born 1990), Mexican boxer, WBA - WBC middleweight champion
- Saúl Armendáriz (born 1970), Mexican wrestler under the ring name Cassandro
- Saul Ascher (1767–1822), Jewish narrative writer and publicist
- Saul Bass (1920–1996), film graphic designer
- Saul Bellow (1915–2005), Canadian author, Nobel Prize for Literature and the Pulitzer Prize
- Saúl Berjón (born 1986), Spanish footballer known as Saúl
- Saul Chaplin (1912–1997), American composer and musical director, three-time Oscar winner
- Saúl Craviotto (born 1984), Spanish sprint canoer, Olympic and world champion
- Saul Dubow, South African historian and academic
- Saúl Fernández García (born 1985), Spanish footballer
- Saúl García (footballer, born 1986), Mexican footballer
- Saúl García (footballer, born 1994), Spanish footballer
- Slash (musician), British-American musician Saul Hudson, guitarist of Guns N' Roses
- Saul Katz (born 1939), President of the New York Mets baseball team
- Saul Kripke (1940–2022), American philosopher and logician
- Saul Landau (1936–2013), American scholar, author, commentator and filmmaker
- Saul Leiter (1923–2013), American photographer, early user of color photography in fine art
- Saul Lieberman (1898–1983), Israeli rabbi and scholar of Talmud
- Saul Milton, British musician, member of Chase & Status
- Saul Levi Morteira (c. 1596–1660), Amsterdam rabbi
- Saul Moyal, Egyptian Olympic fencer
- Saul Nanni (born 1999), Italian actor
- Saúl Ñíguez (born 1994), Spanish footballer
- Saúl Ongaro, Argentine footballer
- Saúl Phillips (born 1984), Costa Rican footballer
- Saul Phillips (basketball) (born 1972), American basketball coach and player
- Saul Raisin (born 1983), road bicycle racer
- Saul Robbins (1922–2010), American toy manufacturer, co-founder of Remco
- Saul Rogovin (1923–1995), American baseball player
- Saul Rubinek (born 1948), German-born Canadian actor and director
- Saul Shapiro, American known for public policy development on digital broadcast
- Saul Steinberg (1914–1999), Romanian-born American cartoonist and illustrator
- Saul Steinberg (businessman) (1939-2012), American businessman and financier
- Saúl Suárez, Colombian football manager in the 1990s
- Saul Teukolsky (born 1947), South African astrophysicist and professor
- Saul Winstein (1912–1969), Canadian chemist
- Saul Williams (born 1972), American rapper, poet, actor and musician
- Saul Zaentz (1921–2014), American film producer and owner of Fantasy Records

== Fictional characters ==
- Saul Berenson, a character in the TV series Homeland
- Saul Goodman, character in the TV series Breaking Bad and Better Call Saul
- Jaguar D. Saul, a character from One Piece

== See also ==
- Shaul
- Sol (given name)
