= Saul (disambiguation) =

Saul, or Shaul, was the first king of the united Israel and Judah.

Saul may also refer to:

== Biblical figures ==
- Paul the Apostle, called Saul of Tarsus before his conversion
- Saul, a king of Edom

== People ==
- Saul (given name), a list of people
- Saul (surname), a list of people

== Places ==
- Saül, French Guiana, a commune
- Saul, County Down, Northern Ireland, a townland and civil parish
  - Saul Monastery, 5th-century monastery near Saul
- Saul, Gloucestershire, England, a village
- Saul, Kentucky, United States, an unincorporated community
- Mount Saul, a mountain in Washington state
- Saul High School of Agricultural Sciences, Roxborough, Philadelphia, United States

== Arts and media ==
=== Television ===
- Saul Bennett, a character in the Australian soap opera Home and Away
- Saul Berenson, a character in the American political-thriller series Homeland
  - "Better Call Saul" (Homeland), an episode of Homeland
- Saul Goodman, a character in the American series Breaking Bad and its spinoff Better Call Saul
  - Better Call Saul, an AMC series spun off Breaking Bad
  - "Better Call Saul" (Breaking Bad), an episode of Breaking Bad
- Saul Malone, a character in the series Saul of the Mole Men
- Saul Tigh, a character in the re-imagined series Battlestar Galactica

=== Other arts and media ===
- Saul (Handel), a 1738 oratorio by George Frideric Handel
- Saul (Alfieri), a 1782 tragedy by Vittorio Alfieri
- Saul (comics), a Marvel Comics character
- Saul (band), a hard rock band formed in 2007
- Saul Karath, a character in the role-playing game Knights of the Old Republic

== See also ==
- Sauls, surname
- Shaul, Hebrew name, variant of Saul
