= Shaul =

- Gender: Male

Origin
- Origin: Hebrew
- Region of origin: Kingdom of Israel, Levant

Other names
- Related names: Saul, Saulo

Shaul is a given name and a surname which may refer to:

Given name:

- Shaul (Hebrew שָׁאוּל Šāʼûl "asked for, prayed for"), usually called Saul in English, the first King of Israel in the Hebrew Bible
- Shaul, a son of Simeon (son of Jacob) in Genesis
- Shaul Amor (1940–2004), Israeli politician
- Shaul Avigur (1899–1978), a founder of the Israeli Intelligence Community
- Shaul Ben-Tzvi, Hebrew name of Paul Shulman (1922–1994), second commander of the Israeli Navy
- Shaul Eisenberg (1921–1997), Jewish businessmen and billionaire
- Shaul Elovitch (born 1949), Polish-born Israeli businessman and owner of Eurocom Group
- Shaul Foguel (1931–2020), Israeli mathematician
- Shaul Gordon (born 1994), Canadian-Israeli Olympic sabre fencer
- Shaul Gutman (born 1945), Israeli academic and former politician
- Shaul Hameed Uvais Karnain (born 1962), Sri Lankan former cricketer
- Shaul Ladany (born 1936), Israeli world-record-holding racewalker, Holocaust and Munich Massacre survivor and Professor of industrial engineering
- Shaul Magid, professor of religious studies
- Shaul Mofaz (born 1943), Israeli former soldier and politician, 16th Chief of the General Staff of the Israel Defense Forces, former Acting Prime Minister, Deputy and Vice Prime Minister and Minister of Defense
- Shaul Rosolio (1923–1992), 5th Israeli Police Commissioner (1972–1977)
- Shaul Shani (born c. 1955), Israeli billionaire investor
- Shaul Shats (born 1944), Israeli painter, printmaker and illustrator
- Shaul Stampfer (born 1948), Jewish historian
- Shaul Tchernichovsky (1875–1943), Russian-born Hebrew poet
- Shaul Yahalom (born 1947), Israeli former politician
- Shaul Yisraeli (1909–1995), rabbi of religious Zionism

Surname:

- Dror Shaul, Israeli filmmaker
- Jamie Shaul (born 1992), English rugby league player
- John Shaul (1873–1953), English recipient of the Victoria Cross

== See also ==
- Ben Zion Abba Shaul (1924–1998), Sephardic rabbi, Torah scholar and halakhic arbiter
- Saul (disambiguation)
