= Zalman =

Zalman (Yiddish: זלמן), occasionally Zalmen is a Yiddish-language variant of Solomon. The name was common among European Jews, and it still has usage in many Haredi and especially Hasidic communities.

== People ==
=== Zalman ===
- Shneur Zalman of Liadi, author of the Shulchan Aruch HaRav and Tanya. Also the founder of the Chabad Lubavitch movement and the oldest still operating charity organization in Israel Colel Chabad (established 1788).
  - The compound name "Shneur Zalman" is common among people of Hasidic Chabad affiliation, derived from their founder, Shneur Zalman of Liadi.
- Zalman Aran (1899–1970), Zionist activist, educator and Israeli politician (also Zalman Aranne)
- Zinovy Gerdt (born Zalman Khrapinovich, 1916–1996), Soviet/Russian theatre and cinema actor
- Zalman Grinberg (1912–1983), Lithuanian/Israeli/American doctor, Holocaust survivor
- Zalman King (1941–2012), American film director, writer, actor and producer
  - Zalman King's Red Shoe Diaries, TV series by the above
- Zalman Kornblit, Romanian Jewish playwright
- Zalman Leib Teitelbaum (born 1951), one of two Grand Rebbes of the Satmar Hasidim (full name Zalman Leib Teitelbaum or Zalman Leib Yekusiel Yehudah Teitelbaum)
- Zalman Melamed, Israeli settler Rabbi (full name Zalman Baruch Melamed)
- Zalmen Mlotek (born 1951), American conductor, composer, musician, and Artistic Director of the National Yiddish Theatre Folksbiene
- Zalman Moishe HaYitzchaki (c. 1872–1952), Chabad-Lubavitch Rabbi (known familiarly as "Reb Zalman Moishe")
- Zalman Nechemia Goldberg (1931–2020), Israeli Rabbi
- Zalman Schachter (1924–2014), Polish-born American Rabbi (full name Zalman Schachter-Shalomi)
- Zalman Schocken (1877–1959), German Jewish, (later Israeli) publisher
- Zalman Shazar (1889–1974), President of Israel
- Zalman Shoval (born 1930), Israeli politician and diplomat
- Zalman Shragai (1898–1995), Mayor of Jerusalem
- Zalman Sorotzkin (1881–1966), East European (later Israeli) Rabbi
- Zalman Usiskin, American mathematician
- Zalman "Zal" Yanovsky (1944–2002), Canadian rock musician
- Elijah ben Solomon Zalman (1720–1797), a Talmudist, halakhist, kabbalist

=== Zalmen ===
- Zalmen Mlotek (born 1951), American conductor, pianist, musical arranger, accompanist, composer, and the Artistic Director of the National Yiddish Theatre Folksbiene
- Zalmen Zylbercweig (1894–1972), Yiddish author

== See also ==
- Salman
- Zelman
