= Robert Solomon =

Robert Solomon may refer to:

- Robert Solomon (politician) (born 1931), former member of the Australian House of Representatives
- Robert M. Solomon, Methodist Bishop
- Robert C. Solomon (1942–2007), professor of philosophy at the University of Texas at Austin

== See also ==
- Solomon (disambiguation)
- Solomon (name)
