= Sol (given name) =

Sol is a given name, usually a form of "Solomon" or a gender-neutral Spanish name meaning "sun." Notable people with the name include:

- Sol Aragones (born 1977), Filipina broadcast journalist and politician
- Sol Bamba (born 1985), French-born Ivorian footballer
- Sol Bloom (1870–1949), member of the U.S. House of Representatives and entertainment entrepreneur
- Sol Brodsky (1923–1984), American comic book artist and key Marvel Comics executive
- Sol Brynn (born 2000), English footballer
- Sol Campbell (born 1974), English footballer
- Sol Davis (born 1979), English footballer
- Sol Eisner (fl. 1937–1951), American soccer player
- Sol Gabetta (born 1981), Argentinian cellist
- Sol Hachuel (1817–1834), Jewish martyr and heroine
- Sol Halperin (1902–1977), American special effects artist
- Sol Heras (born 1987), English actor
- Sol Hoʻopiʻi (1902–1953), Hawaiian guitarist
- Sol Hurok (1888–1974), American impresario
- Sol Kaplan (1919–1990), American film and television music composer
- Sol Kerzner (1935–2020), South African businessman
- Sol Kimel (1928-2021), Israeli chemical physicist
- Sol Lesser (1890–1980), American film producer
- Sol LeWitt (1928–2007), American artist
- Sol Linowitz (1913–2005), American diplomat, lawyer, and businessman
- Sol Martinez Fainberg (born 2002), Spanish-Argentinian rhythmic gymnast
- Sol Miranda, Puerto Rican actress
- Sol Orwell (born 1983), entrepreneur
- Sol Pais, American student and FBI manhunt subject
- Sol Plaatje (1876–1932), South African intellectual, journalist, linguist, politician, translator, and writer
- Sol Price (1916–2009), American businessman and founder of FedMart and Price Club
- Sol Saks (1910–2011), creator of the television comedy show Bewitched
- Sol Schiff (1917–2012), American table tennis player
- Sol Schoenbach (1915–1999), American bassoonist, teacher and pedagogue
- Sol Scott (born 2007), British gymnast
- Sol C. Siegel (1903–1982), American reporter and film producer
- Sol Spiegelman (1914–1983), American molecular biologist
- Sol Star (1840–1917), businessman and politician
- Sol Tax (1907–1995), American anthropologist
- Sol Tolchinsky (1929–2020), Canadian basketball player
- Sol Trujillo (born 1951), American businessman
- Sol Wachtler (born 1930), American lawyer, politician, and ex-judge
- Sol M. Wurtzel, (1890–1958) American film producer

== See also ==
- Saul (given name)
- Solomon (name)
