= FL-boat =

Ship

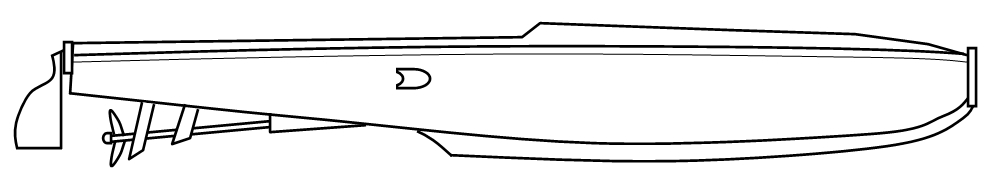
- Diagram of a Fernlenkboot

Class overview
- Name: Fernlenkboote
- Builders: Siemens-Schuckert
- Operators: Imperial German Navy
- Completed: 17

General characteristics
- Tonnage: 6
- Length: 17 m (55 ft 9 in)
- Speed: 30 knots (56 km/h; 35 mph)
- Crew: None
- Armament: 700 kg (1,500 lb) explosive charge

The FL-boat (Fernlenkboot, literally "remote controlled boat") was a weapon used by the Imperial German Navy during World War I. It was a remote-controlled motorboat, 17 m long, carrying 700 kilograms (1,500 lb) of explosives, which was intended to be steered directly at its targets - initially the Royal Navy monitors operating off the coast of Flanders.

FL-boats were constructed by Siemens-Schuckertwerke. They were driven by internal combustion engines and controlled remotely from a shore station through spooled wire unwound behind the boat. The wire was 20 kilometres (12 mi) long and the spool weighed 800 kilograms (1,800 lb). An aircraft could be used to signal directions to the shore station by radio. The commands available to the boat operator were:

- System test
- Engine start, engine stop
- Set Rudder position
- Turn on a light, to enable the boat to be tracked at night
- Detonate the warhead, to prevent capture of the boat if it missed its target

Planned developments were to use a control station carried on a ship, in an airship or use a radio-control system. The boats could attain speeds of 30 knots (56 km/h; 35 mph).

On 1 March 1917 an FL-boat hit the Nieuwpoort mole and on 28 October 1917 one hit the Royal Navy monitor HMS Erebus.

== See also ==
- MT explosive motorboat, similar Italian assault boats of World War II, manned early in a mission but with an ejector seat
- Naval drone
