= MT explosive motorboat =

Weapon of the Regia Marina

MT (Motoscafo da Turismo)
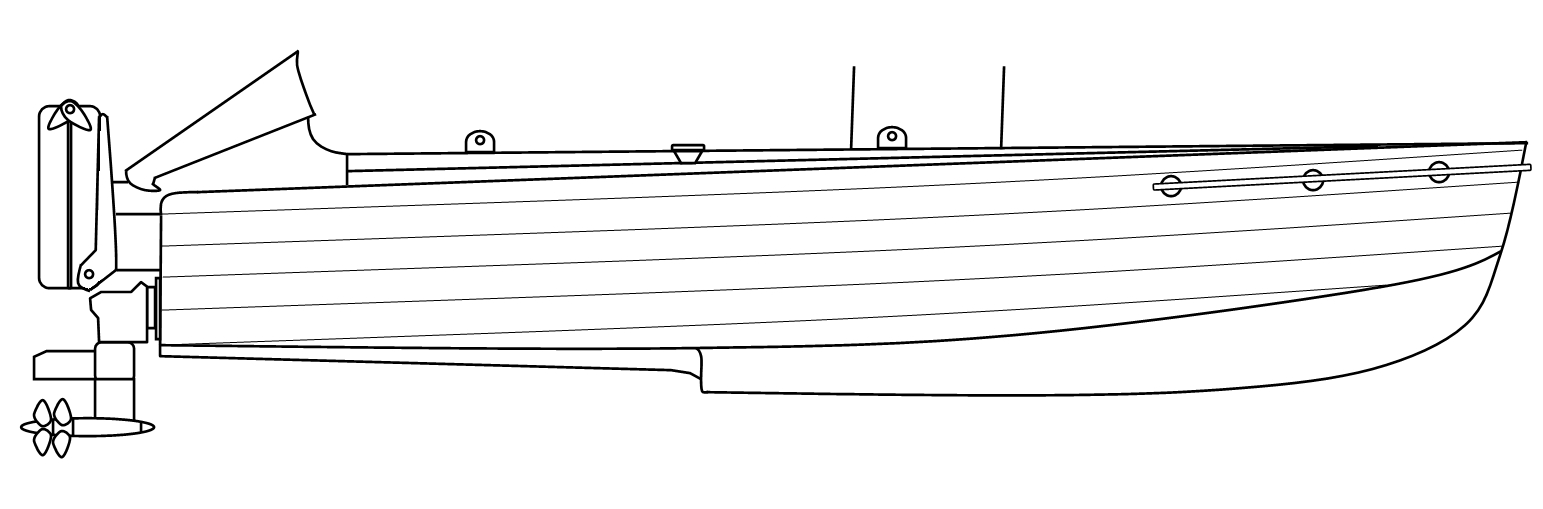
- MT explosive motorboat
- Type: Explosive motorboat
- Place of origin: Italy

Service history
- In service: 1940–1949
- Used by: Regia Marina; National Republican Navy; Israeli Navy
- Wars: World War II; 1948 Arab-Israeli War

Production history
- No. built: approx. 20
- Variants: MT; MTM; MTR

Specifications
- Guidance system: Manually piloted with gyroscopic stabilisation and automatic running
- Launch platform: Surface ship, submarine

The explosive motorboat MT (Motoscafo da Turismo) also known as barchino (Italian for "little boat"), was a series of small explosive motor boats developed by the Italian Royal Navy, which was based on its predecessors, the prototype boat MA (Motoscafo d'Assalto) and the MAT (Motoscafo Avio Trasportato), an airborne prototype. Explosive motorboats were designed to make a silent approach to a moored warship, set a collision course and run into full gear until the last 200 or 100 yards to the target, when the pilot would eject after locking the rudder. At impact, the hull would be broken amidships by a small explosive charge, sinking the boat and the warhead, which was fitted with a water-pressure fuse set to go off at a depth of one metre.

By the end of September 1938 the Navy Department ordered six explosive boats. The one-pilot vessels were built by the companies Baglietto of Varazze and CABI Cattaneo of Milan, which was also to supply the engines. The small vessels were used by the Italian Navy in at least two major operations in the Mediterranean theatre during World War II, and sank a number of ships, including the British heavy cruiser HMS York.

== Delivery and trials ==
The first six boats were delivered in early 1939, immediately after which test trials were conducted off La Spezia. The MT explosive motorboat revealed some weaknesses. The deck was made of tarpaulins, which exposed the hull to leakage from splashing at high speed. The naval command demanded the addition of a solid wooden deck and a larger freeboard of 0.9 m (later enlarged to 1.1 m) and sent the boats and machine parts back to the manufacturer so that they could implement the requirements. In March 1939, the Navy Department ordered a further 12 explosive boats, increasing the total number to 18.

== MT deployment ==
The 18 motor boats were not operational until November 1940, when a full trial was carried out with a reduced warhead against an old warship. That was just six months after Italy's entry into World War II as an ally of Nazi Germany. More extensive testing before the official line-up showed once again that the boat's operational performance was limited. Consequently, an improved sea-going version, which also included a reverse gear, was designed, the MTM (Motoscafo da Turismo Modificato).

== Specifications ==
The MTs had a length of 5.62 m (18.4 ft) and a beam of 1.62 m (5.3 ft). They were propelled by a 71 kW (95 hp) Alfa Romeo AR 6cc Inboard motor and developed a maximum speed of 61 km/h (33 kn) at full load. The boats were specially equipped to be launched from a surface mother ship and then make their way through obstacles such as torpedo nets. The pilot would steer the assault craft on a collision course at his target ship, and then would jump from his boat before impact and warhead detonation. The pilot's cockpit was at the rear, in order to ensure an even distribution of weight with the 330 kg explosive charge inside the bow.

Contrary to Japanese Shinyo-class motorboats, MT boats, though very dangerous to use in combat, were not designed as suicide weapons: Installed over the transom, the pilot had a crude ejector seat and after bailing out, the seat acted as a miniature raft to keep the pilot out of the water and immune from the lethal shock of the underwater explosion. Another very innovative design was the Isotta-Fraschini Z-drive transmission system, featuring an inboard engine and twin outboard contra-rotating propellers.

== Operational history ==
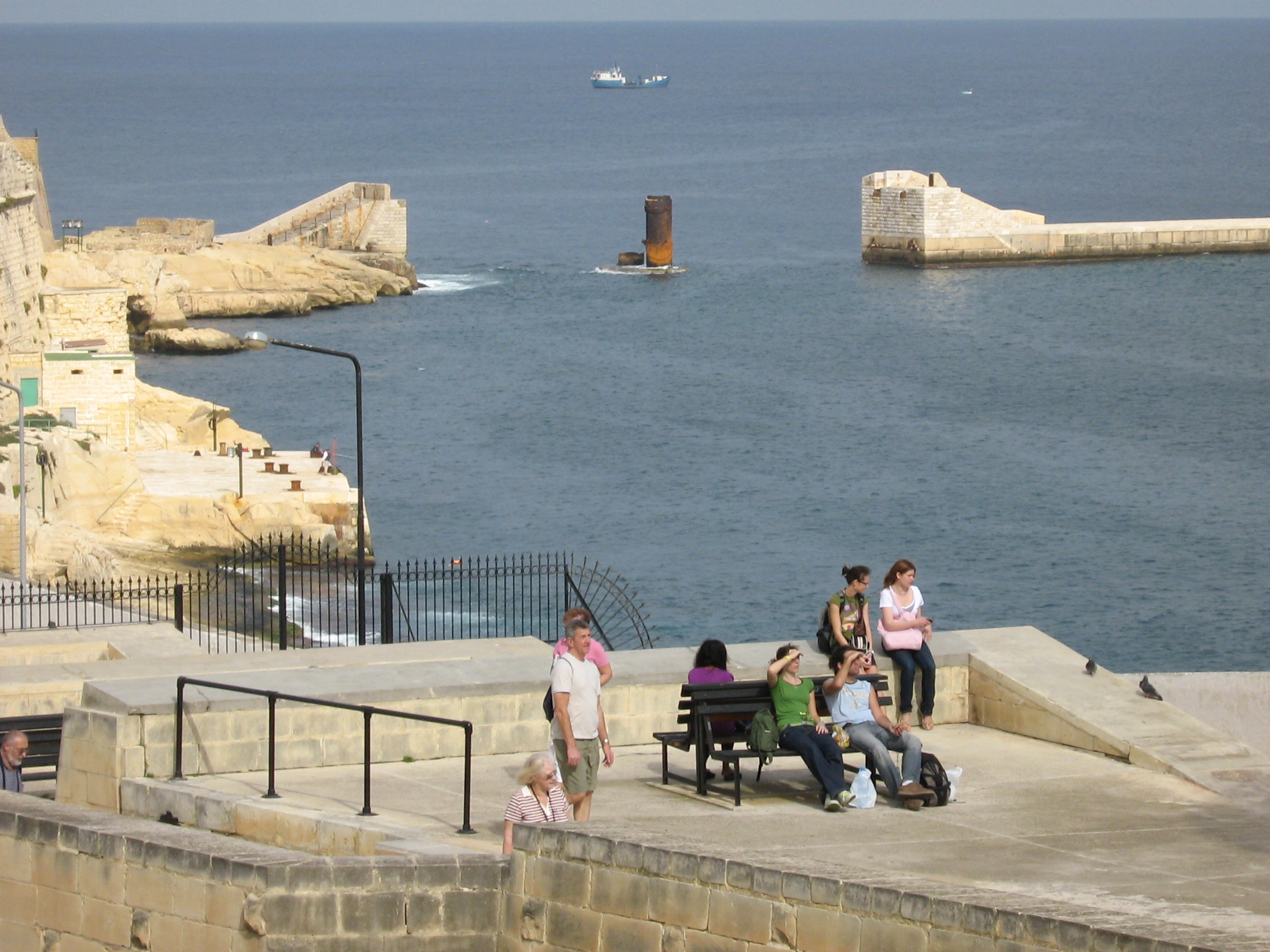
The remains of St. Elmo Bridge which collapsed after the MT boat attack of 1941 (before a new bridge was built in 2012).

On 25 March 1941, the destroyers Francesco Crispi and Quintino Sella departed from Leros island in the Aegean Sea at night for the allied naval base at Souda Bay, Crete, each one carrying three MTs. The destroyers released their MTs some 10 nm off Suda Bay. Once inside the bay, the six boats located their targets: the British heavy cruiser HMS York, the Norwegian tanker Pericles of 8,300 tons, another tanker, and a cargo ship. Two MTs hit York amidships, flooding her aft boilers and magazines. The Pericles was severely damaged and settled on the bottom. The other barchini apparently missed their intended targets, and one of them was stranded on the beach. All six Italian pilots were captured. The disabled York was later scuttled with demolition charges by her crew before the German conquest of Crete, while the disabled Pericles sank in April 1941 while being towed to Alexandria.

On 26 July 1941, two human torpedoes (Maiale) and ten MAS boats (including six MTs) launched an unsuccessful attack on the British naval base at Valletta, Malta. The MTs were transported and lowered off La Valetta by the sloop Diana. The force was detected early on by a British radar facility, but the British coastal batteries held their fire until the Italians approached to close range. Fifteen Decima MAS crewmen were killed and 18 captured. All six MTs, both human torpedoes and two MAS boats (MAS 451 and MAS 452) were lost either to the coastal artillery or aircraft. One of the MTs hit a pile of the bridge linking Fort Saint Elmo with the breakwater, which collapsed with the blast, blocking the entrance to the harbor. The bridge was never restored, and a new one was not built until 2012.

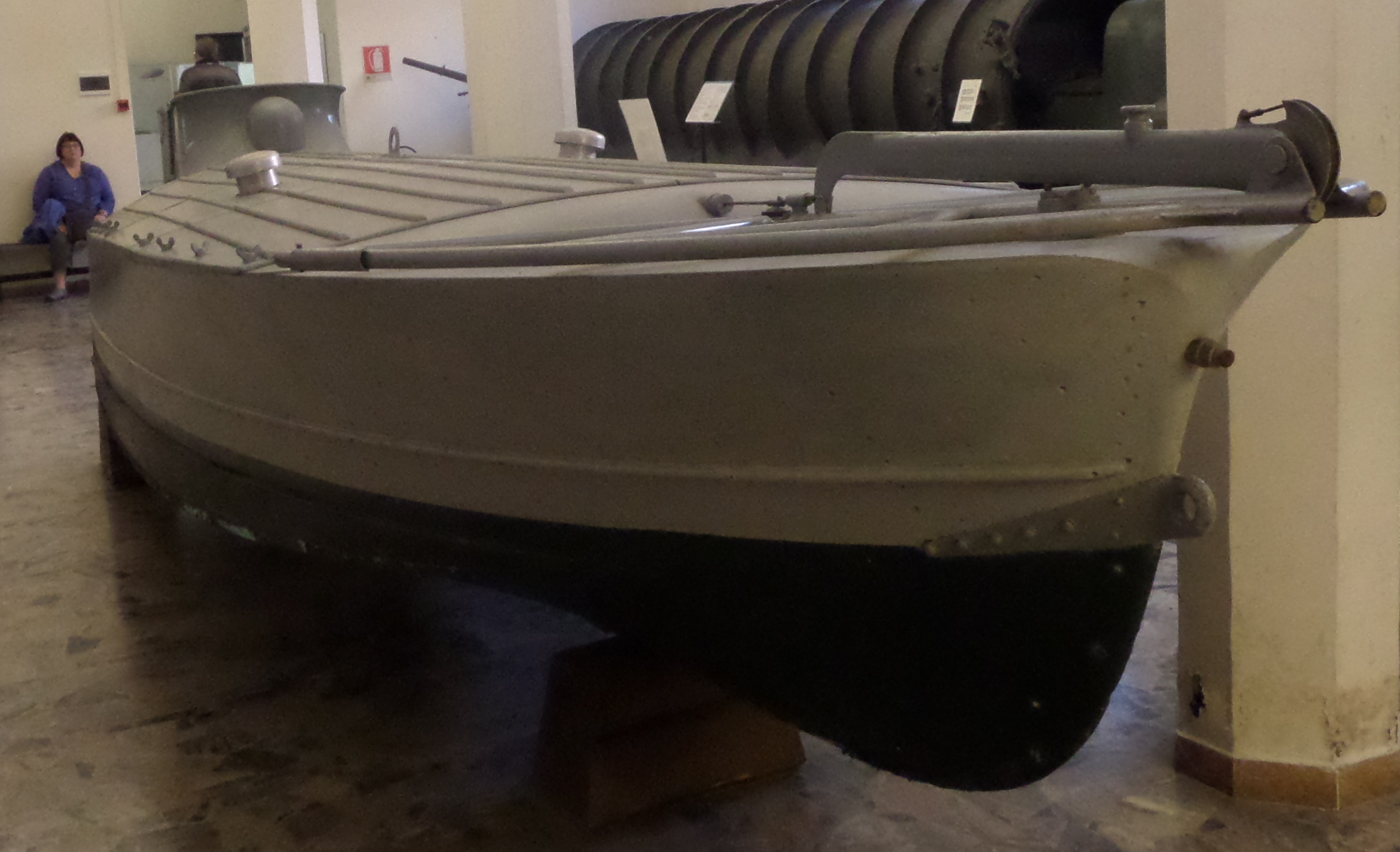
MTM in the Naval Museum, Venice.

The MTs were eventually superseded by the MTMs by the fall of 1941. The MTMs were deployed to the Black Sea at German request, in support of Operation Barbarossa from March 1942 to May 1943 and along the Libyan-Egyptian coast from August to September 1942, in both cases with little success. On 29 June 1942, during the Black Sea campaign, a number of MTMs supported a diversionary German landing near Balaklava. One of the explosive boats was intentionally run aground and set off on a beach occupied by Soviet troops in order to create confusion about the main landing point.

Later in the war, the Italian Navy developed a third type of explosive motorboat, the MTR (Motoscafo da Turismo Ridotto), a light version of the MTM for being carried to the intended target by submarine, on the same containers used to transport human torpedoes. An attempt against Allied naval forces in the Messina Strait was aborted when the submarine carrying the MTRs, the Ambra, was depth-charged on 25 July 1943 by Allied aircraft. The containers were distorted by the explosions and the boats became jammed inside.

After Italy signed an armistice with the Allies, the Italian Social Republic, a fascist puppet state in northern Italy which remained part of the Axis, continued to build and use MTMs along with MTSM motor torpedo boats, a longer version of the MTM armed with two torpedoes. During the last days of the war in Europe, on 16 April 1945, a flotilla composed of one MTSM and six MTMs engaged the French destroyer Trombe off Liguria. An MTM hit and heavily damaged the warship, which was eventually declared a constructive total loss.

=== Israeli navy ===
At least four MTMs survived World War II to be used by Shayetet 13, the naval commandos of the Israeli Navy, during the 1948 Arab-Israeli War. Three of them, transported by the former United States Navy patrol yacht INS Ma'oz (K 24), attacked the Egyptian sloop El Amir Farouq and a BYMS-class minesweeper in the Mediterranean on 22 October 1948, off the Sinai Peninsula. The sloop sank in five minutes, while the minesweeper was severely damaged and had to be written off. Unlike the Italian procedure, the Israelis allocated a fourth boat to rescue the pilots. Another MTM was deployed to the Red Sea, tasked with infiltrating secret agents into Jordan.

== See also ==
- Decima Flottiglia MAS
- FL-boat, German boats of WWI
- Human torpedo
- MAS (boat)
- Raid on Souda Bay
- Shinyo (suicide motorboat)
- Unmanned surface vehicle
