= Breaking Bad (disambiguation) =

Breaking Bad is an American television series.

Breaking Bad may also refer to:

- Breaking Bad (franchise), the larger franchise
- "Breaking Bad" (Better Call Saul), an episode of Breaking Bad spinoff series Better Call Saul
- "Pilot" (Breaking Bad), the pilot episode of Breaking Bad which is titled "Breaking Bad" on DVD and Blu-ray releases
- Breaking Bad: Criminal Elements, a 2019 mobile game developed by FTX Games based on the series
- El Camino: A Breaking Bad Movie, a 2019 film sequel of Breaking Bad

== See also ==
- "Breaking Brad", an episode of the television series Loki
- Better Call Saul (disambiguation)
