= Egyptian sloop El Amir Farouq =

Flagship of the Egyptian Navy, sunk in 1948

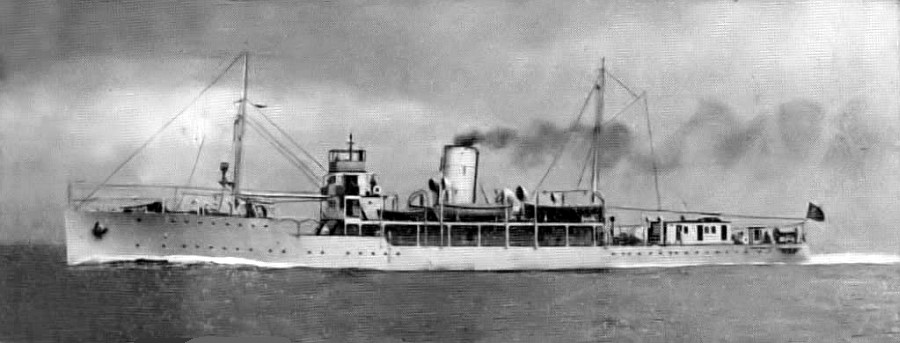
- Emir Farouk, 1947

History

Kingdom of Egypt
- Name: El Amir Farouq
- Namesake: Farouk of Egypt
- Builder: Hawthorn Leslie, Tyne
- Launched: 11 November 1926
- Commissioned: 1936
- Fate: Sunk 22 October 1948

General characteristics
- Displacement: 1,441 t (1,418 long tons)
- Length: 75.3 m (247 ft 1 in)
- Beam: 10.4 m (34 ft 1 in)
- Draught: 4.4 m (14 ft 5 in)
- Speed: 17 knots (31 km/h; 20 mph)
- Complement: 70
- Armament: 1 x 1 - 57/40 6pdr Hotchkiss Mk I, 4 x 1 - 7.7/87

El Amir Farouq, also written as Emir Farouk or King Farouk, was a sloop of the Egyptian Navy launched in 1926 as a passenger cargo ship before conversion to military service in 1936. She was similar in construction and appearance to the Flower-class sloop but differed in engines and armament. She served as the flagship of the Egyptian Navy. On 22 October 1948, the ship was sunk in the Mediterranean Sea off Gaza by an explosive motorboat of the Israeli Navy during the Israeli naval campaign in Operation Yoav as part of the 1948 Arab-Israeli War.
