= Malia Solomon =

Hawaiian cultural historian and textile artist

- Born: November 24, 1915; Honolulu
- Died: May 8, 2005

Mary "Aunty Malia" Blanchard Solomon (November 24, 1915 – May 8, 2005) was a Hawaiian textile artist and expert on Hawaiian customs, crafts, and culture. Solomon researched and traveled across the South Pacific to regain lost knowledge about kapa, the traditional Hawaiian craft of making cloth from the fibers of trees. The Chicago Tribune called Solomon one of Hawaii's "foremost amateur anthropologist/historians."

== Biography ==
Mary Blanchard Solomon was born in Honolulu, Hawaii on November 24, 1915. Solomon grew up in a poor section of Honolulu. She spent the early part of her life working at various jobs with her husband to support their five children.

She and her husband Herman left Hawaii after a dock strike left them struggling to make ends meet. They established a catering business in California, where they lived for ten years, but returned the family to Hawaii after growing homesick for the islands.

== Efforts to preserve Hawaiian culture ==
Along with her husband, Solomon opened Ulu Mau Village in 1960, a site featuring recreations of daily life in ancient Hawaii. The site featured demonstrations of quilt making, poi pounding, kukui nut candle making, and other crafts. The "villagers" were people who possessed good speaking skills and were knowledgeable about ancient Hawaiian culture. Ulu Mau Village was established in Ala Moana Beach Park, later moving to Heʻeia Kea, where it eventually closed. Solomon ran Ulu Mau for ten years, while traveling and studying to learn more about the pre-Western cultural traditions of Hawaii.

In the 1960s, Solomon worked closely with anthropologist Kenneth Emory to study the extensive collection of Hawaiian kapa at the Bishop Museum. She traveled to locations were tapa cloth (bark cloth) was being made, including Samoa, Tonga, Tahiti, Fiji and the Marquesas and Cook Islands, exploring dyes and techniques that would have been used by ancient Hawaiians. Solomon was unable to find wauke (paper mulberry), the plant used to create high quality kapa, in Hawaii, so she planted slips retrieved from Samoa on the grounds of the Ulu Mau Village. After the wauke grew to maturity in eighteen months, she experimented with scraping, soaking, and beating the plant fibers until creating a cloth similar to what she had seen at the Bishop Museum. She continued her research for many years, visiting modern practitioners and scholars to learn about different methods of creating and binding dyes.

After Ulu Mau Village closed, Solomon led tours sharing her knowledge of Hawaii's history and culture. She also ran a "mini-museum" of Hawaiiana at the Hyatt Regency Waikiki hotel. Solomon was known as "Aunty Malia" throughout Hawaii.

== Death and legacy ==
Solomon died May 8, 2005.

Solomon is credited with helping revive the art of kapa in Hawaii. In the 1960s Laurance Rockefeller commissioned Solomon to create fourteen large wall hangings for the Mauna Kea Beach Hotel; her work is still displayed there, after extensive restoration by the Bishop Museum. Ulu Mau Village has been called an effort in preserving Hawaiian culture before the Second Hawaiian Renaissance of the 1970s.

Solomon was profiled on the PBS series American Perspective, in a segment called "Aunty Malia: Tapa Maker."

In 1988 the Hawaii State Legislature passed a resolution declaring Solomon a "ambassadress of good will."
