= HMCS Norsyd =

Modified Flower-class corvette

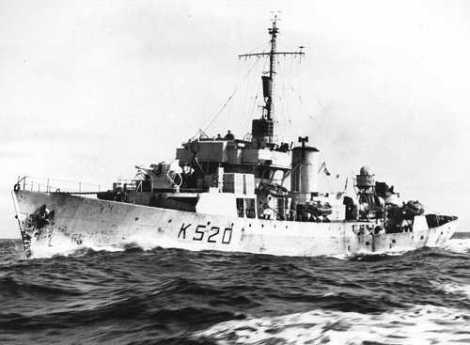
- HMCS Norsyd

History

Canada
- Name: HMCS Norsyd
- Namesake: North Sydney, Nova Scotia
- Ordered: 2 January 1942
- Builder: Morton Engineering and Dry Dock Co., Quebec City
- Laid down: 14 January 1943
- Launched: 31 July 1943
- Commissioned: 22 December 1943
- Decommissioned: 25 June 1945
- Identification: Pennant number: K520
- Honours and awards: Atlantic 1944-45; Gulf of St. Lawrence 1944
- Fate: Sold for mercantile use 1946

Israel
- Name: INS Haganah
- Acquired: 1948
- Decommissioned: 1954
- Identification: K-20
- Fate: Scrapped 1956

General characteristics
- Class & type: Flower-class corvette (modified)
- Displacement: 1,015 long tons (1,031 t; 1,137 short tons)
- Length: 208 ft (63.40 m)o/a
- Beam: 33 ft (10.06 m)
- Draught: 11 ft (3.35 m)
- Propulsion: single shaft; 2 × oil fired water tube boilers; 1 triple-expansion reciprocating steam engine; 2,750 ihp (2,050 kW)
- Speed: 16 knots (29.6 km/h)
- Range: 7,400 nautical miles (13,705 km) at 10 knots (18.5 km/h)
- Complement: 90
- Sensors & processing systems: 1 Type 271 SW2C radar; 1 Type 144 sonar
- Armament: 1 × 4 in (102 mm) QF Mk XIX naval gun; 1 × 2-pounder Mk.VIII single "pom-pom"; 2 × 20 mm Oerlikon single; 1 × Hedgehog A/S mortar; 4 × Mk.II depth charge throwers; 2 × depth charge rails with 70 depth charges

HMCS Norsyd was a modified Flower-class corvette that served with the Royal Canadian Navy during the Second World War. She served primarily in the Battle of the Atlantic as a convoy escort. She was named for North Sydney, Nova Scotia, her name being a contraction of the city's name. This was due to a naming conflict with a Royal Australian Navy vessel. After the war she served as a merchant ship and then as a corvette in the Israeli Navy.

== Background ==
Flower-class corvettes like Norsyd serving with the Royal Canadian Navy during the Second World War were different from earlier and more traditional sail-driven corvettes. The "corvette" designation was created by the French as a class of small warships; the Royal Navy borrowed the term for a period but discontinued its use in 1877. During the hurried preparations for war in the late 1930s, Winston Churchill reactivated the corvette class, needing a name for smaller ships used in an escort capacity, in this case based on a whaling ship design. The generic name "flower" was used to designate the class of these ships, which – in the Royal Navy – were named after flowering plants.

Corvettes commissioned by the Royal Canadian Navy during the Second World War were named after communities for the most part, to better represent the people who took part in building them. This idea was put forth by Admiral Percy W. Nelles. Sponsors were commonly associated with the community for which the ship was named. Royal Navy corvettes were designed as open sea escorts, while Canadian corvettes were developed for coastal auxiliary roles which was exemplified by their minesweeping gear. Eventually the Canadian corvettes would be modified to allow them to perform better on the open seas.

== Construction ==
Norsyd was ordered 2 January 1942 as part of the 1942-43 modified Flower-class building programme. This programme was known as the Increased Endurance. Many changes were made, all from lessons that had been learned in previous versions of the Flower-class. The bridge was made a full deck higher and built to naval standards instead of the more civilian-like bridges of previous versions. The platform for the 4-inch main gun was raised to minimize the amount of spray over it and to provide a better field of fire. It was also connected to the wheelhouse by a wide platform that was now the base for the Hedgehog anti-submarine mortar that this version was armed with. Along with the new Hedgehog, this version got the new QF 4-inch Mk XIX main gun, which was semi-automatic, used fixed ammunition and had the ability to elevate higher giving it an anti-aircraft ability.

Other superficial changes to this version include an upright funnel and pressurized boiler rooms which eliminated the need for hooded ventilators around the base of the funnel. This changed the silhouette of the corvette and made it more difficult for submariners to tell which way the corvette was laying.

Norsyd was laid down by Morton Engineering and Dry Dock Co. at Quebec City, Quebec 14 January 1943 and was launched 31 July 1943. She was commissioned into the Royal Canadian Navy 22 December 1943 at Quebec City. She was diverted to Saint John, New Brunswick en route to Halifax for fitting out. This was not completed until March 1944. In May 1945, Norsyd began the only refit of her war career at Halifax. It was completed in June 1945.

== Service history ==
After working up in Bermuda, Norsyd was assigned to the Western Local Escort Force working as an escort on the "Triangle Run" between Boston, New York and Halifax. She joined escort group W-7 until November 1944. While escorting a convoy on 8 September 1944 she spotted U-541 preparing to attack the convoy while on the surface in the Gulf of St. Lawrence. Norsyd opened fire and U-541 was forced to dive. The u-boat was then hunted for two days by four frigates, a minesweeper and aircraft of the Royal Canadian Air Force, but escaped.

She transferred to the Mid-Ocean Escort Force that month, becoming a trans-Atlantic convoy escort. She was assigned to escort group C-2 and remained with the group until departing for refit in May 1945. She never returned to active service.

=== Immigrant ship ===
Norsyd was paid off 25 June 1945 at Sorel, Quebec and laid up. She was transferred to the War Assets Corporation, stripped of her guns at City Island in New York and underwent further work and provisioning in Staten Island. In 1946 she was sold to the Mossad for Aliyah Bet and registered in Panama as Balboa, which was used to smuggle Jewish Holocaust survivors into British-Mandated Palestine as part of the Aliyah Bet movement. She then sailed for Marseille, on April 1946, with a crew of American volunteers through two Zionist youth movements, Hashomer Hatzair and Habonim. In Marseille, she was refitted with wooden shelves to serve as bunks, that would accommodate 1,250 refugees. After several weeks, when this work was completed, she was renamed Haganah and sailed to the less conspicuous port of Sete, on 21 June 1946. At Sete, she was boarded by more than 1,000 refugees and sailed towards Palestine, the next day. A journalist for the New York City newspaper, I. F. Stone participated on this voyage and recounted this voyage in a book Underground to Palestine.

As the preceding Immigration ship, Wedgwood, was captured by the British as it reached the shores of Palestine, the leaders of Aliyah Bet feared the same would happen with Haganah. A plan was devised to transfer all refugees to the smaller Turkish ship Akbel II midsea and free Haganah for another trip to Europe. The transfer was set to occur about 100 miles (160 km) off the shore of Palestine. As Haganah sailed from Sete to rendezvous with Akbel II, the refugees were kept below deck so as to not alert the British on the cargo of refugees. While conditions below deck were crowded and poorly ventilated, the refugees would lounge on deck so long as no other boat was sighted. On the second day at sea, a dramatic reunion occurred on deck, between a young Hashomer Hatzair woman and a large older polish refugee, who had saved her from execution in the concentration camp in Auschwitz.

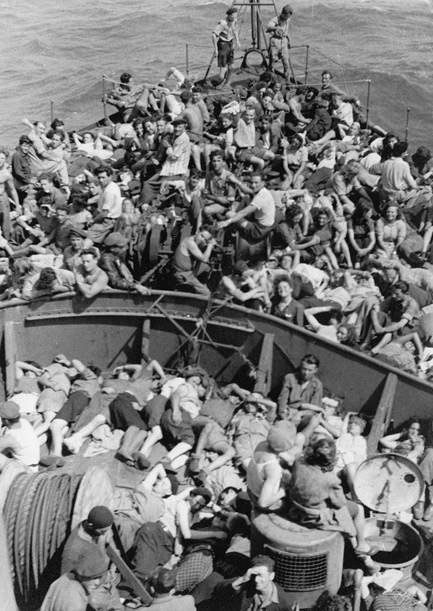

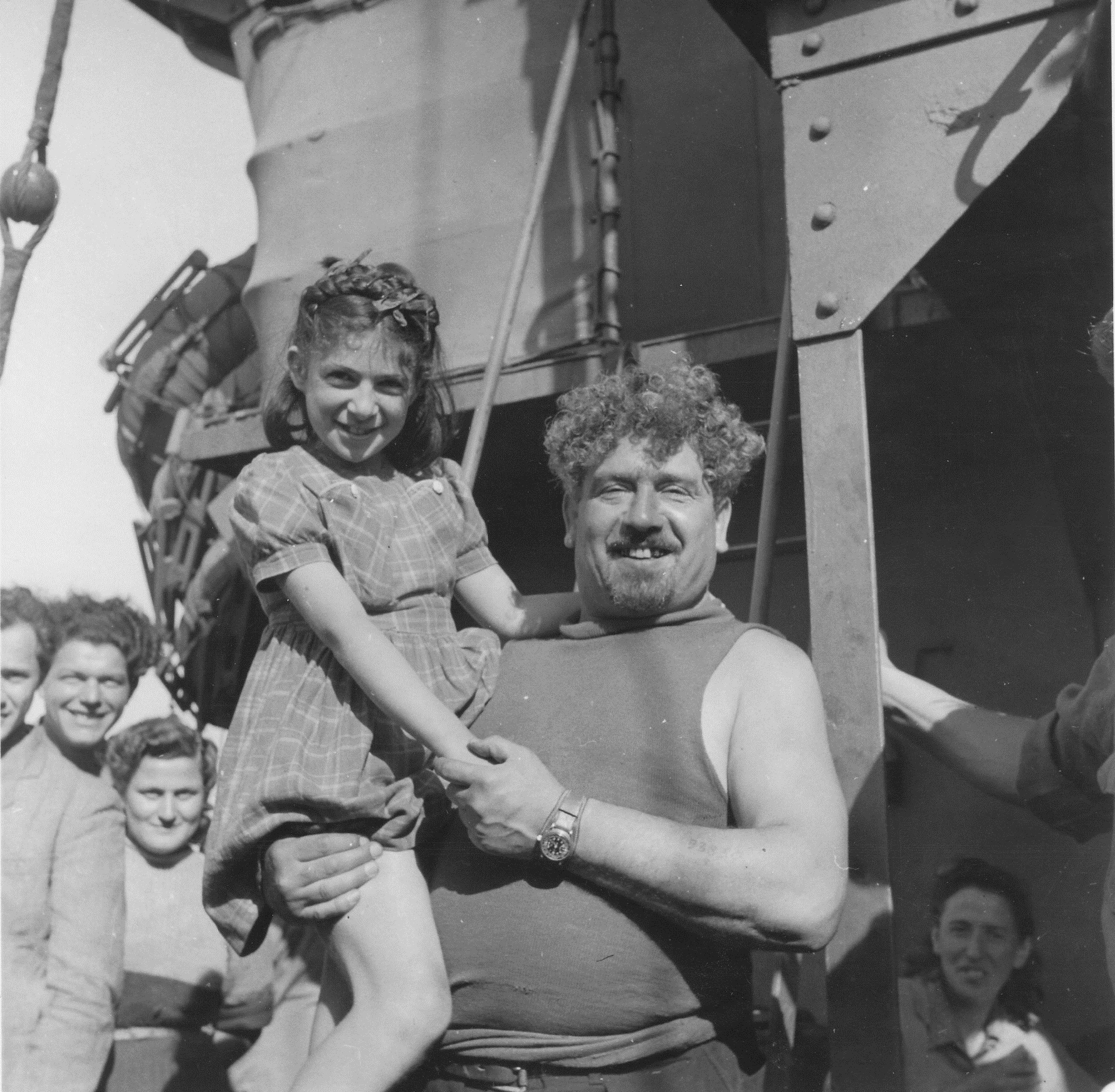

Despite rough seas and engine trouble, Haganah was successful in her rendezvous with Akbel II and all refugees were transferred over. Akbel II was renamed Birya and headed toward British-Mandated Palestine, where she was escorted to the port of Haifa by the British destroyer HMS Virago.

==== The second voyage of Haganah ====
After her rendezvous with Akbel II, Haganah sailed to Mylos, Greece for fuel and provisions. From there she headed to Baka, Yugoslavia where she was boarded by 2,700 Holocaust survivors, which was more than twice as many passengers than the previous voyage. As she headed towards British-Mandated Palestine, she encountered crowded conditions, engine trouble and failing generators. She was able to continue on her journey by burning her wooden bunks to create steam. As she neared the shore, she was met by two British destroyers that intended to board Haganah. After brief hand to hand combat, the British were able to take command of Haganah and tow her to the port of Haifa. The refugees were detained in the port and then interned in the detention camp in Atlit. Hagnah remained moored in the port of Haifa until the creation of the State of Israel.

=== Israeli Naval Service ===
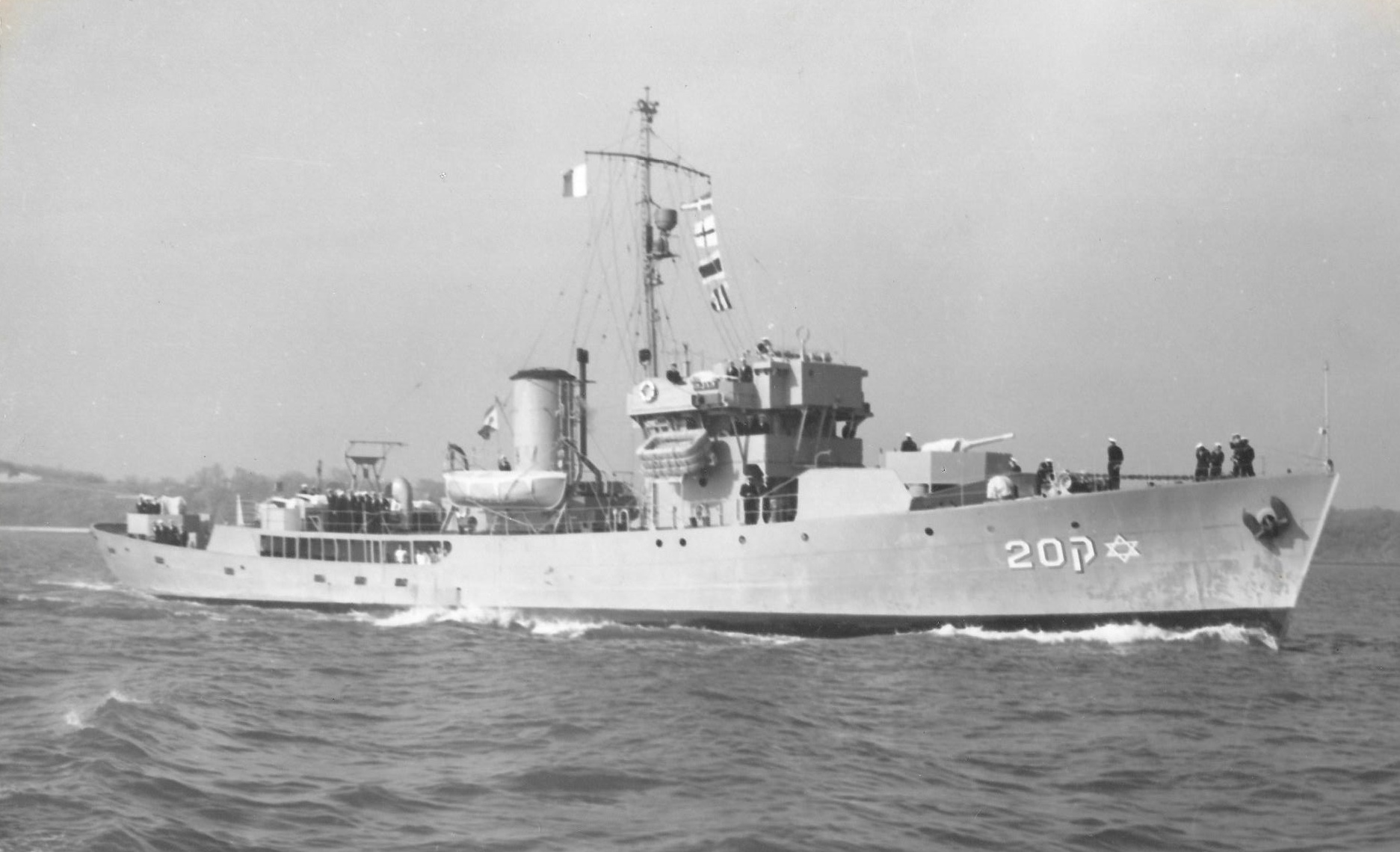

In 1948 she was taken over and rearmed by the nascent Israeli Navy and retained the name Haganah. During her service with the Israeli Navy, she fought in the 1948 Arab–Israeli War. During Operation Yoav, she, alongside INS Wedgwood, another corvette, engaged Egyptian naval forces and shore batteries. They did little damage and suffered enough damage that they had to be sent back to Haifa for repairs. She was paid off and broken up in 1956.
