= Sauls =

Sauls is a surname. Notable people with the surname include:

- Ashley Sauls, South African politician
- Ben Sauls (born 2001), American football player
- Christa Sauls (born 1972), American model and actress
- Helen Sauls-August, South African politician
- James Sauls, American physicist
- John I. Sauls, American politician
- Robert Sauls, American politician
- Stacy F. Sauls (born 1955), American Episcopal bishop

== See also ==
- Saul
