= Salomão =

Salomão is a Portuguese masculine given name and surname. It is the Portuguese form of Solomon. Notable people with the name include:

== Given name ==
- Salomão Barbosa Ferraz (1880–1969), Brazilian Roman Catholic priest
- Salomão Coxi (born 2002), Angolan footballer
- Salomão Mazuad Salha (born 1972), Lebanese footballer
- Salomão Mondlane (born 1995), Mozambican footballer
- Salomão Manuel Troco (born 1992), Angolan footballer

== Surname ==
- Diogo Salomão (born 1988), Portuguese footballer
- Tomaz Salomão (born 1954), Mozambican economist
- Waly Salomão (1943–2003), Brazilian poet
