= Shneur Zalman (given name) =

Shneur Zalman (Hebrew: שניאור זלמן) refers to Shneur Zalman of Liadi (1745–1812), the founder of the Chabad Lubavitch movement.

The compound given name Shneur Zalman is common among people of Hasidic Chabad affiliation, derived from their founder's name. Other notable people with this name include:

- Chaim Schneur Zalman Schneersohn of Liadi (1814–1880), Hasidic rebbe in the town of Liadi, the first rebbe of the Liadi branch of Chabad.
- Shneur Zalman Fradkin of Lublin (1830–1902), also known as the Toras Chessed or The Liader, a famous Chabad posek and gaon
- Shneur Zalman Odze (born 1981), Orthodox Jewish rabbi and UK Independence Party (UKIP) politician
- Shneur Zalman Rubashov, birth name of Zalman Shazar (1889–1974), Israeli politician, author and poet; the third President of Israel for two terms
- Schneour Zalman Schneersohn (1898–1980) was a Lubavitch Hasidic Chief Rabbi who was active in France during World War II
- Zalman Shneour (born Shneur Zalkind; 1887 – 20 February 1959) Israeli Yiddish and Hebrew poet and author
