= Richard Solomon =

Richard Solomon may refer to:

- Richard Solomon (psychologist) (1918–1995), American psychologist
- Richard Solomon (barrister) (1850–1913), British member of Parliament and Attorney General of the Cape Colony and of the Transvaal
- Richard Solomon (basketball) (born 1992), American basketball player
- Richard H. Solomon (1937–2017), United States Assistant Secretary of State and Ambassador to the Philippines

== See also ==
- Richard Solomons (born 1961), British businessman
