= Saulo =

Saulo may refer to the following people:

== Given name ==
- Saulo Araújo Fontes (born 1989), Brazilian football goalkeeper
- Saulo Batista de Andrade Cordeiro (born 1979), Brazilian football midfielder
- Saulo Benavente (1916–1982), Argentine painter
- Saulo Cavalari (born 1989), Brazilian kickboxer
- Saulos Chilima, Malawian economist and politician
- Saulo de Freitas (born 1967), Brazilian footballer and manager
- Saulo Decarli (born 1992), Swiss football defender
- Saulo Estevao da Costa Pimenta (born 1974), Brazilian football player
- Saulo Fernandes (born 1977), Brazilian singer
- Saulo Ferreira Silva (born 1995), Brazilian football goalkeeper
- Saulo Haarla (1930–1971), Finnish actor and theatre manager
- Saülo Mercader (born 1944), Spanish artist
- Saulo Mineiro (born 1997), Brazilian football forward
- Saulo Pedroso (born 1983), Brazilian politician
- Saulo Ribeiro (born 1974), Brazilian Jiu-Jitsu practitioner
- Saulo Rodrigues dos Santos (born 1982), Brazilian footballer
- Saulo Roston (born 1989), Brazilian pop singer and songwriter
- Saulo Squarsone Rodrigues dos Santos (born 1985), Brazilian football goalkeeper
- Saulo Torón Navarro (1885–1974), Spanish poet

== Surname ==
- Celeste Saulo (born 1964), Argentine meteorologist
- Manasa Saulo (born 1989), Fiji rugby union footballer
- Ramon Sauló (born 1954), Spanish singer and graphic designer
- Vui Florence Saulo, businesswoman and politician from American Samoa
