= Paul Shulman =

Israeli Navy general (1922–1994)

Shaul Ben-Tzvi
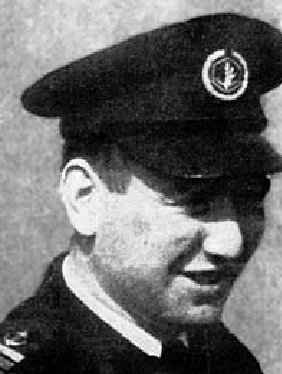
- Native name: פול נחמן שולמן
- Born: 31 March 1922; Connecticut, United States
- Died: 16 May 1994 (aged 72) Haifa, Israel
- Allegiance: State of Israel
- Branch: Israeli Navy
- Service years: 1945-1949
- Rank: Aluf
- Commands: Commander of the Israeli Navy
- Conflicts: World War II; 1947–1949 Palestine war
- Other work: Advisor to the Prime Minister on Naval Issues

Paul Nachman Shulman (Hebrew: פול נחמן שולמן; 31 March 1922 – 16 May 1994), also known by his Hebrew name, Shaul Ben-Tzvi, was the second commander of the Israeli Navy.

== Biography ==
Paul Nachman Shulman was born on 31 March 1922 in Connecticut and raised in New York. Shulman graduated from the United States Naval Academy at Annapolis graduating, early, because of wartime in 1944, with the class of 1945. During World War II, he fought in the Pacific theater and was discharged from the US Navy in 1945 after the surrender of Japan. Shulman was very affected by the Holocaust, and decided to help smuggle Jews from post-Holocaust Europe into Mandatory Palestine. In 1948, Shulman emigrated to Israel.

In November that year, he was asked by Prime Minister David Ben-Gurion to help establish an Israeli Navy. During the 1948 Arab-Israeli War, he commanded a blockade of the Gaza Strip and the capture of Ein Gedi on the Dead Sea. In 1949, he became the second commander of the Navy, after Gershon Zak decided to return to a career in education. However, he retired from the Navy in 1949, becoming an advisor to Ben-Gurion on naval issues.

In 1994, he died in his home in Haifa at the age of 72.
