= HMCS Beauharnois (K540) =

Modified Flower-class corvette

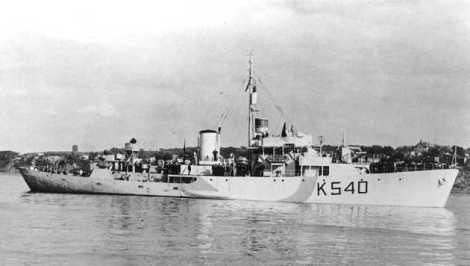
- HMCS Beauharnois

History

Canada
- Name: HMCS Beauharnois
- Namesake: Beauharnois, Quebec
- Ordered: June 1942
- Builder: Morton Engineering & Dry Dock Co., Quebec City
- Laid down: 8 November 1943
- Launched: 11 May 1944
- Commissioned: 25 September 1944
- Decommissioned: 12 July 1945
- Identification: Pennant number: K540
- Honours and awards: Atlantic 1944-45
- Fate: Sold to Mossad LeAliyah Bet in 1946

Israel
- Name: INS Wedgwood
- Namesake: Josiah Wedgwood
- Commissioned: 9 September 1948
- Decommissioned: 1954
- Identification: K-18
- Fate: Scrapped 1956

General characteristics
- Class & type: Modified Flower-class corvette
- Displacement: 1,015 long tons (1,031 t; 1,137 short tons)
- Length: 208 ft (63.4 m)o/a
- Beam: 33 ft (10.1 m)
- Draught: 11 ft (3.35 m)
- Installed power: 2 × water tube boilers; 2,750 ihp (2,050 kW)
- Propulsion: 1 × 4-cylinder triple-expansion reciprocating steam engine; single shaft
- Speed: 16 knots (29.6 km/h)
- Range: 3,500 nautical miles (6,482 km) at 12 knots (22.2 km/h)
- Complement: 90
- Sensors & processing systems: 1 × Type 271 SW2C radar; 1 × Type 144 sonar
- Armament: 1 × 4 inch BL Mk.IX single gun; 1 × 2-pdr. Mk.VIII single "pom-pom" AA gun; 2 × 20 mm Oerlikon single; 1 × Hedgehog A/S mortar; 4 × Mk.II depth charge throwers; 2 depth charge rails with 70 depth charges

HMCS Beauharnois was a modified Flower-class corvette that served with the Royal Canadian Navy during the Second World War, primarily in the Battle of the Atlantic. After the war it was sold to a Jewish resettlement movement and eventually made its way into the nascent Israeli Navy.

== Background ==
Flower-class corvettes like Beauharnois serving with the Royal Canadian Navy during the Second World War were different to earlier and more traditional sail-driven corvettes. The "corvette" designation was created by the French as a class of small warships; the Royal Navy borrowed the term for a period but discontinued its use in 1877. During the hurried preparations for war in the late 1930s, Winston Churchill reactivated the corvette class, needing a name for smaller ships used in an escort capacity, in this case based on a whaling ship design. The generic name "flower" was used to designate the class of these ships, which – in the Royal Navy – were named after flowering plants.

Corvettes commissioned by the Royal Canadian Navy during the Second World War were named after communities for the most part, to better represent the people who took part in building them. This idea was put forth by Admiral Percy W. Nelles. Sponsors were commonly associated with the community for which the ship was named. Royal Navy corvettes were designed as open sea escorts, while Canadian corvettes were developed for coastal auxiliary roles which was exemplified by their minesweeping gear. Eventually the Canadian corvettes would be modified to allow them to perform better on the open seas.

== Construction ==
Beauharnois was ordered in June 1942 as part of the 1943-44 Increased Endurance Flower-class building program, which followed the main layout of the 1942-43 program. The only significant difference is that the majority of the 43-44 program replaced the 2-pounder Mk.VIII single "pom-pom" anti-aircraft gun with two twin 20 mm and two single 20 mm anti-aircraft guns. She was laid down as Buckingham before her name was changed to Beauharnois on 8 November 1943 by Morton Engineering & Dry Dock Co. in Quebec City. She was launched 11 May 1944 and commissioned 25 September of that year in Quebec City.

== War service ==
After working up in Bermuda, Beauharnois joined the Mid-Ocean Escort Force escort group C-4 and worked escorting convoys across the Atlantic. Due to her late entry into the war, she did not see much action, and her final duties of the war consisted of escorting the cable ship SS Lord Kelvin.

== Post-war service ==
Beauharnois was sold to Mossad LeAliyah Bet in 1946 along with the ex-HMCS Norsyd. The two ships were used to smuggle Jewish holocaust survivors into British-held Palestine as part of the Aliyah Bet. Beauharnois was renamed Wedgwood, after Josiah Wedgwood, a British statesman who became an outspoken advocate of Zionism. During April 1946, Wedgwood set sail for Italy on her mission to transport Holocaust survivors to British-mandated Palestine. One week into her trans-Atlantic voyage, she encountered engine trouble and succeeded in reaching Ponta Delgada on the Azores Islands. One holocaust survivor, who fled Europe to the Azores was taken aboard after the ship was repaired and set sail for Italy.

At this stage the voyage, she crossed paths with a British aircraft carrier, which signaled to her. Wedgwood did not return the signal, yet docked alongside the same ship when refueling at Gibraltar. When questioned on the nature of her voyage, the crew of Wedgewood stood behind their cover story of a ship in service of the United Nations Refugee Agency. From Gibraltar, Wedgwood sailed to Savona, Italy, where she was refurbished to transport refugees. On 18 June, she left Savona to a nearby beach to collect refugees. During boarding of the refugees, Italian police appeared and ordered the ship not to leave. While negotiations were ongoing between the Aliyah Bet network and Italian authorities, the crew cut the mooring ropes, jettisoned the gangplank and headed for international waters, with 1,250 refugees, by dawn the next day.

On 25 June as Wedgwood was 75 miles (121 km) off the coast of Palestine, British aircraft began tracking the ship. Two Royal Navy destroyers, HMS Venus and HMS Talybont advanced toward Wedgwood. Other destroyers stationed themselves between Wedgwood and the beach of Palestine. At this point, the passengers and the crew raided the Star of David flag and a banner that proclaimed "We survived Hitler. Death is no stranger to us. nothing can keep us from our Jewish homeland. The blood is on your head if you fire on this unarmed ship." Despite the evasive maneuvering of Wedgwood, Venus eventually came alongside her and sent a boarding party to take over the ship. She was impounded at Haifa, Israel until Israel's independence. She was then commissioned in the Israeli Navy and fought during the 1948 Arab–Israeli War under the name of Hashomer, designated the K 20. She was retired in 1954 and scrapped in 1956.
