= BYMS-class minesweeper =

1941 class of American minesweepers

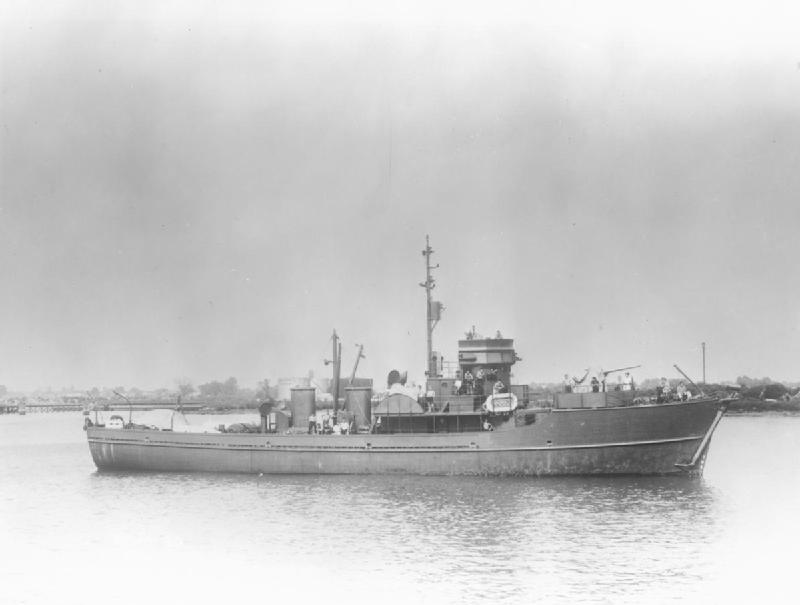
- BYMS 2030

Class overview
- Operators: Royal Navy; Finnish Navy; Hellenic Navy; Royal Netherlands Navy
- Built: 1941–1943
- Completed: 150

General characteristics
- Type: Minesweeper
- Displacement: 270 long tons (274 t)
- Length: 136 ft (41 m)
- Beam: 24 ft 6 in (7.47 m)
- Draught: 8 ft (2.4 m)
- Propulsion: General Motors 8-268A diesel engines, two shafts
- Speed: 15 knots (17 mph; 28 km/h)
- Complement: 32
- Armament: 1 × 3"/50 caliber gun; 2 × 20 mm guns; 2 × Depth charge projectors

The BYMS class was a class of wooden motor minesweepers, part of the United States Navy YMS-1 class minesweepers. One hundred fifty ships destined for the United Kingdom were launched from 1941 to 1943.

== Ships ==
The initial 80 ships were ordered by the U.S. Navy specifically for transfer to the United Kingdom under the Lend-Lease Programme. On transfer to Britain, BYMS-1 through BYMS-80 were assigned the British pennant numbers BYMS-2001 through BYMS-2080. Names were not assigned to the class members.

A further 53 BYMS vessels bore hull numbers from 137 to 284. These were originally built for the U.S. Navy as part of the YMS-1 class and transferred to Britain on, or shortly after, completion. On the Navy List they were designated BYMS, with their original U.S. Navy numbers. The remaining 17 BYMS vessels were delivered in a final batch.

By 1949, only 18 remained in service with the Royal Navy: BYMS-2031, 2039, 2044, 2047, 2049, 2052, 2055, 2063, 2070, 2079, 2157, 2167, 2173, 2213, 2214, 2234, 2253 and 2279.

Twenty-five were transferred to the Royal Hellenic Navy between December 1943 and September 1948: Afroessa (ex-BYMS-2185, ex-YMS-185), Andromeda (ex-BYMS-2261, ex-YMS-261), Ariadne (ex-BYMS-2058, ex-BYMS-58), Aura (ex-BYMS-2054, ex-BYMS-54), Ithiki (ex-BYMS-2240, ex-YMS-240), Kalymnos (ex-BYMS-2033, ex-BYMS-33), Karteria (ex-BYMS-2065, ex-BYMS-65), Kassos (ex-BYMS-2074, ex-BYMS-74; mined 15 October 1944), Kefallinia (ex-BYMS-2171, ex-YMS-171), Kerkyra (ex-BYMS-2172, ex-YMS-172), Klio (ex-BYMS-2152, ex-BYMS-152), Kos (ex-BYMS-2191, ex-YMS-191; mined 15 October 1944), Lambadias (ex-BYMS-2182, ex-YMS-182), Lefkas (ex-BYMS-2068, ex-BYMS-68), Leros (ex-BYMS-2186, exYMS-186), Paralos (ex-BYMS-2066, ex-BYMS-66), Patmos (ex-BYMS-2229, ex-YMS-229), Paxi (ex-BYMS-2056, ex-BYMS-56), Pigassos (ex-BYMS-2221, ex-YMS-221), Prokyon (ex-BYMS-2076, ex-BYMS-76), Salaminia (ex-BYMS-2067, ex-BYMS-67), Symi (ex-BYMS-2190, ex-YMS-190), Thalia (ex-BYMS-2252, ex-YMS-252), Vegas (ex-BYMS-2078, ex-BYMS-78) and Zakynthos (ex-BYMS-2209, ex-YMS-209)

Ten were transferred to the Royal Netherlands Navy between March 1946 and April 1947: Borndiep (ex-BYMS-2210, ex-YMS-210), Deurloo (ex-BYMS-2254, ex-YMS-254), Hollandsch Diep (ex-BYMS-2050, ex-BYMS-50), Marsdiep (ex-BYMS-2038, ex-BYMS-38), Oosterschelde (ex-BYMS-2230, ex-YMS230), Texelstroom (ex-BYMS2156, ex-YMS-156), Vliestroom (ex-BYMS-2155, ex-YMS-155), Volkerak (ex-BYMS-2188, ex-YMS-188"), Westerschelde (ex-BYMS-2046, ex-BYMS-46) and Zuiderdiep (ex-BYMS-2048, ex-BYMS-48).

Five were purchased by Finland in 1948 of which four were transferred to the Finnish Navy and the remaining one was refurbished as missionary ship in 1953 and named Ebeneser. The ship sailed to Ceylon in and later on to Indonesian waters. The ship was lost in tropical storm in 1983.: Purunpää, Vahterpää, Tammenpää, and Katanpää. These were previously designated BYMS-2032, BYMS-2044, BYMS-2049 and BYMS-2047.

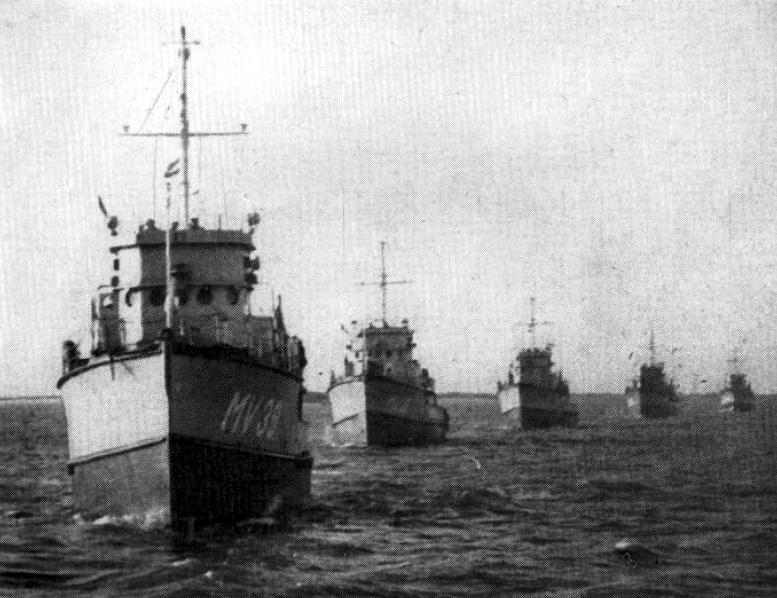
Dutch BYMS-class minesweepers in 1948, led by Westerschelde.

== Calypso ==
Jacques Cousteau's well-known research ship Calypso was originally built by the Ballard Marine Railway Company of Seattle, Washington, United States. She was a BYMS Mark 1-class motor minesweeper, laid down on 12 August 1941 with the yard designation BYMS-26, and launched on 21 March 1942. She was commissioned into the Royal Navy in February 1943 as HMS J-826 and assigned to active service in the Mediterranean Sea, redesignated as BYMS-2026 in 1944, laid up at Malta and finally struck from the Naval Register in 1947.

== See also ==
- YMS-1 class minesweeper
