= Quarta Flottiglia MAS =

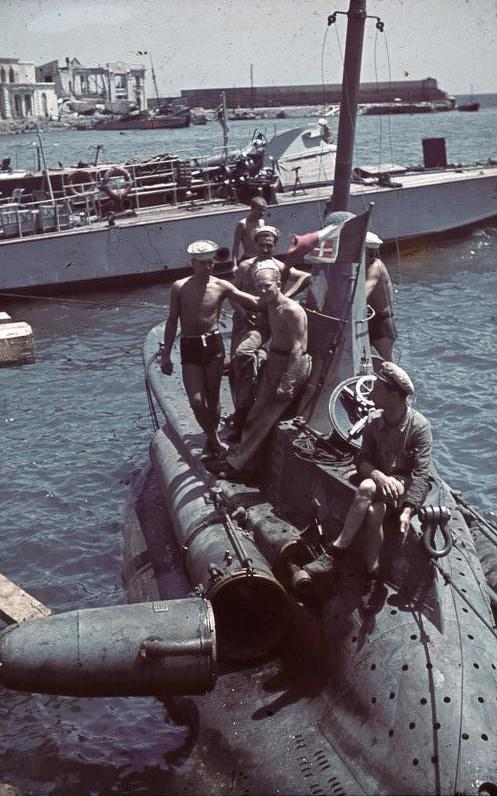
- Italian midget submarine with naval personnel in a Crimean port
- Active: May 1942–20 May 1943
- Country: Italy
- Branch: Regia Marina
- Type: MAS flotilla
- Role: Anti-submarine warfare Raiding; Torpedo warfare
- Garrison/HQ: Yalta
- Nicknames: IVª Flottiglia MAS; 101ª Squadra; 101ª Flottiglia MAS
- Equipment: MAS boats CB-class midget submarines MTSM attack crafts MTM "Barchini" motor assault boats
- Engagements: Sinking of the Soviet submarine Shch-214, Sinking of the Soviet heavy cruiser Molotov, Sinking of the Soviet submarine Shch-203

Commanders
- Notable commanders: Francesco Mimbelli

The Quarta Flottiglia MAS (Quarta Flottiglia Motoscafi Armati Siluranti) (Italian for "4th Assault Vehicle Flotilla") was an Italian flotilla of the Regia Marina (Italian Royal Navy) created during the Fascist regime.

== History ==
By January 1942 many MAS boats were worn out or in need of refit, but losses had been quite light and the Regia Marina's Chief of Staff, Admiral Arturo Riccardi, could easily accept a German request made that month to deploy Italian coastal forces to the Black Sea. Rome regarded this as an opportunity to somewhat balance the German transfer of 15 S30 class Schnellboote and 15 R1 class motor minesweepers to the Mediterranean in November 1941.

The Russian expeditionary force consisted of the IV Flottiglia, MAS 566-575 under Commander Francesco Mimbelli, who had distinguished himself with his torpedo boat Lupo during the battle of Crete in 1941. Beginning in April the boats trucked over the Alps and down the Danube River. Six midget submarines (CB 1-6), a Squadriglia of five MTSM attack craft (an enlarged and improved hull version of the earlier MTs, 8.3m long with two engines, one torpedo and better sea-keeping characteristics) and five explosive boats made the journey in the same fashion. A Navy motorised column supported the Squadriglia. This gave the force flexibility and mobility along the coastal front. The whole transfer process was completed by May 1942.

From 27 May 1942 until 13 May 1943 the MAS Black Sea flotilla had ten encounters with Soviet surface forces and seven with submarines. The MAS made their first night attack on 2 June 1942, missing a freighter escorted by two destroyers and two patrol boats. On the night of 9/10 June MTSMs launched torpedoes against two destroyers and on the same night, off Sevastopol, MAS 571 cut through a Soviet escort including the destroyers Bditelny and Svobodny and a pair of minesweepers and torpedoed the Soviet motor ship Abkhazia (4,727 GRT) from 900m. German dive-bombers finished off the crippled freighter the next day. At dawn on 18 June, after an hour long engagement, MAS 570 and 571 led by Mimbelli sank two Russian launches full of troops. The next night MAS 571 torpedoed and sank the Soviet submarine Shch-214 near Cape Ai-Todor, recovering two sailors. On 29 June, Admiral Karlgeorg Schuster (Commander-in-Chief of Naval-Group-Command South of the Kriegsmarine) transmitted to Admiral Arturo Riccardi his personal congratulations, citing in an official radio broadcast 'the fighting spirit of the Italian crews under the command of Captain Francesco Mimbelli.'

On 1 July MAS 570, 572 and 573 sank a patrol boat and recued 15 Soviet sailors. Some minutes after midnight on 2 August MAS 568 charged the Kirov-class cruiser Molotov. The MAS discharged both its torpedoes from 800m and one struck blowing off 20m of the cruiser's stern, she was out of action until late 1944. The Soviet destroyer Kharkov tried to chase down the MAS, but the elusive boat discouraged pursuit by dropping depth charges in her path. In late 1942, the remaining five Italian CB-class midget submarines were refitted at the Constanța Shipyard in Romania. On the night of 13 March 1943 MAS 568 and 570 damaged, two Soviet patrol boats with machine gun fire and, on the night of 19 April, MAS 567, 568, 569 and 572 shot up two armoured gunboats. On 21 April MAS 567 and 569 damaged two Soviet MTBs during a brief mélee.

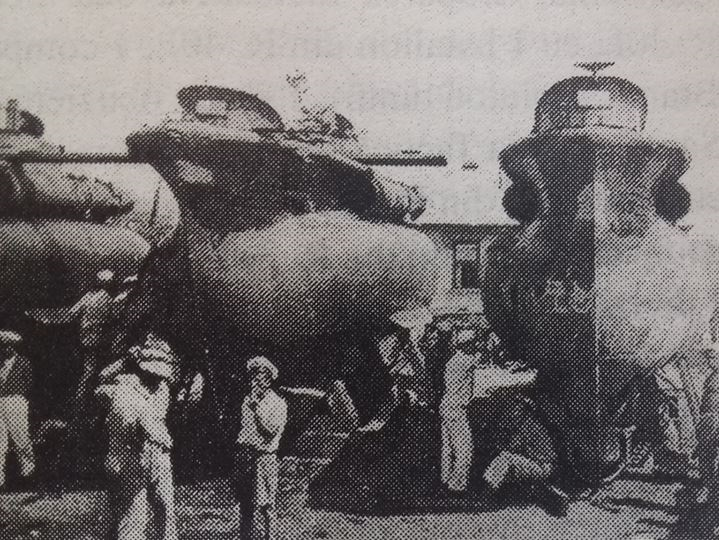
The Black Sea Italian midget submarines under Romanian control, late 1943

The Italian MAS also acted as a flank force in support of army operations off Sevastopol and Novorossiysk and, despite their obvious vulnerability, they captured more than a thousand Soviet troops during the course of their campaigns. The Flottiglia lost two torpedo boats and one midget submarine, all of them victims of bombing raids while in port. On 20 May 1943 the Regia Marina decided to repatriate the crew, leaving to German sailors the vessels that were still able to be used. Named S501-507 the Kriegsmarine's Black Sea MAS boats saw little use due to a lack of spares and German distaste for such small MTBs. S501, 506 and 507 were paid off by 20 October 1943 while the remaining four carried out anti-submarine patrols duties. The last units with Italian crews that continued to operate in the Black Sea were the five CB midget submarines, which, from the new Sevastopol base made, from June to August 1943, other 21 missions. On 26 August 1943, CB-4 torpedoed and sank the Soviet Shchuka-class submarine Shch-203. After the Allied armistice with Italy in September 1943, the five extant Italian CB-class midget submarines (CB-1, CB-2, CB-3, CB-4 and CB-6) were transferred to the Royal Romanian Navy. They were all scuttled in the Black Sea in August 1944, after King Michael's Coup.

== Notable personnel ==
- Salvatore Todaro – naval officer and submariner

== Bibliography ==
- Lupinacci, Pier Filippo (1962). La marina italiana nella seconda guerra mondiale. Vol. XI: Attività della marina in Mar Nero e sul lago Ladoga. Ufficio Storico della Marina Militare.
- Forczyk, Robert (2008). Sevastopol 1942: Von Manstein's Triumph. Oxford: Osprey Publishing. ISBN 978-1846032219.
- Bagnasco, Erminio; Cernuschi, Enrico; O'Hara, Vincent P. (2008). "Italian fast coastal forces: development, doctrine and campaigns, 1914–1986. Part Two: 1934 to 1986". Warship. London: Conway: 62–81.
- Bagnasco, Erminio (2012). "In guerra sul mare - Navi e marinai italiani nel secondo conflitto mondiale". Storia Militare Dossier (3). ISSN 2279-6320.
- Bagnasco, Erminio (2015). "I mezzi d'assalto italiani 1940-1945". Storia Militare Dossier (22). ISSN 2279-6320.
- Bianchi, Gianni (2015). La XII e IV Flottiglia MAS nel Lago Ladoga e Mar Nero. Sarasota.
- Fiore, Massimiliano (2024). "Crucial but Overlooked: The Italian Naval Contribution to the Conquest of Sevastopol". War in History. 31 (1): 82–96. doi:10.1177/09683445231162301.
