= Francesco Mimbelli =

Italian naval officer (1903–1978)

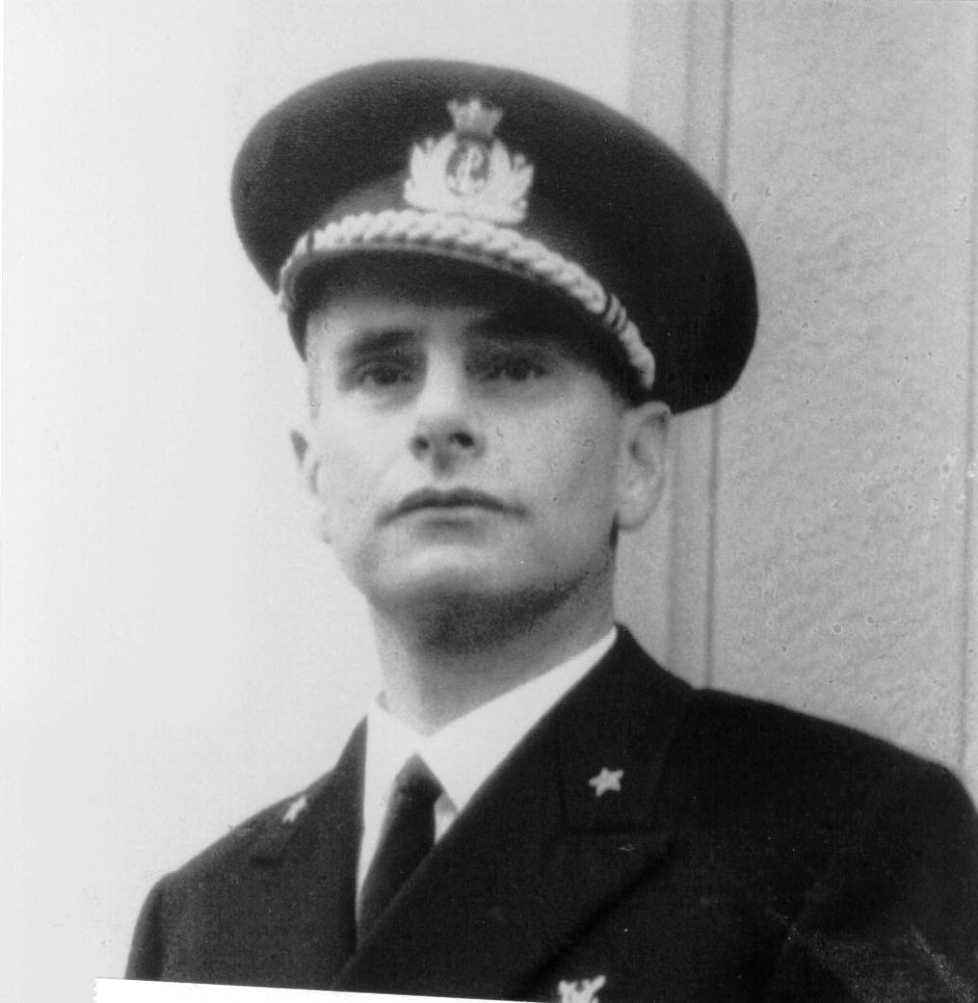
- Mimbelli in 1940
- Born: 16 April 1903; Livorno, Tuscany, Kingdom of Italy
- Died: 26 January 1978 (aged 74); Rome, Lazio, Italy
- Military career
- Allegiance: Kingdom of Italy
- Branch: Regia Marina
- Service years: 1918-1964
- Rank: Ammiraglio di squadra (Squadron Admiral)
- Commands: Lupo (torpedo boat); Quarta Flottiglia MAS; Vittorio Veneto (light cruiser); Giuseppe Garibaldi (light cruiser); 3nd Naval Division; Italian Naval Academy; 2nd Naval Division; MARIDIPART Ancona; Commander in Chief Naval Fleet
- Conflicts: Italian invasion of Albania; World War II; Battle of the Mediterranean; Attack on Convoy AN 14; Battle of Crete; Siege of Sevastopol
- Awards: Gold Medal of Military Valor; Silver Medal of Military Valor (twice); Bronze Medal of Military Valor (five times); War Cross for Military Valor; Iron Cross, 1st class; Iron Cross, 2nd class

Francesco Mimbelli (16 April 1903, in Livorno – 26 January 1978, in Rome) was an Italian naval officer who fought in World War II.

== Biography ==
=== Early life ===
Mimbelli came from a Livornese family with links to Ragusa (modern Dubrovnik). He entered the Italian Naval Academy in 1918 and graduated as an ensign in 1923. In the late 1920s he served on Royal Italian Navy (Regia Marina) gunboats in China. Promoted to lieutenant he served on the Italian delegation to the London Naval Conference in 1930. He subsequently served on the cruiser Trento moving to the torpedo boat arm in 1937, subsequently being promoted to frigate captain and serving in the Navy Ministry. On the outbreak of war he was appointed to command a torpedo boat flotilla.

=== Crete ===
Mimbelli was the commander of torpedo boat Lupo which fought in the Battle of Crete. On the night of May 21, 1941, the Royal Navy took advantage of the darkness to evade the Luftwaffe and then scatter a German invasion convoy of two thousand German troops approaching Crete. Mimbelli was responsible for defending the convoy. Mimbelli engaged three British light cruisers at point-blank range, taking 18 six-inch hits but driving off the warships before they could sink all the transports and machine-gun helpless survivors in the water. Although the odds were heavily stacked against him (one torpedo boat against the seven ships of Force D) more than two-thirds of the convoy survived due to Mimbelli's maneuvers.

=== Black Sea ===
He was later appointed commander of the Italian naval forces based in the Black Sea, where he commanded IV MAS Flotilla, consisting of 8 MAS boats, 6 CB-class midget submarines, 5 MTs and five MTSMs.

Between the end of June and the beginning of July, 1942, the Italian MAS participated, along with the Germans and the Romanians, in the capture of Sevastopol and Balaklava. Between May and July, the MAS completed 65 missions, while the motor torpedo boats and the midget submarines completed 56 and 24 respectively. On 29 June, Admiral Karlgeorg Schuster (Commander-in-Chief of Naval-Group-Command South of the Kriegsmarine) transmitted to Admiral Arturo Riccardi his personal congratulations, citing in an official radio broadcast 'the fighting spirit of the Italian crews under the command of Captain Francesco Mimbelli.'

On the night between 2 and 3 August 1942, MAS 573, MAS 568, and MAS 569 attacked the heavy cruiser Molotov and the destroyer Kharkov out on a mission to intercept a German transport operation southwest of Kerch. They torpedoed the Soviet cruiser Molotov which was not repaired until after the end of the conflict.

On 26 August 1943, Italian CB-4 midget submarine torpedoed and sank the Soviet Shchuka-class submarine Shch-203.

=== Post War ===
In 1946 Mimbelli joined the Italian Navy (Marina Militare) and was appointed captain of the cruiser Giuseppe Garibaldi. He was subsequently promoted to rear admiral and became commander of the Italian Naval Academy. He retired as a vice admiral in 1964 and died on 26 January 1978, in Rome.

== Commemoration ==
In 1992 the Italian Durand de la Penne-class destroyer Francesco Mimbelli was named in his honour.
