= Italian ship Animoso =

Animoso was the name of at least three ships of the Italian Navy and may refer to:

- Italian destroyer Animoso (1913), an Audace-class destroyer launched in 1913 and discarded in 1923.
- Italian torpedo boat Animoso, a Ciclone-class torpedo boat launched in 1942 and transferred to the Soviet Union under the designation Z 16 in 1949.
- Italian destroyer Animoso (D 560), a Durand de la Penne-class destroyer launched in 1989 as Animoso but she was renamed Luigi Durand de la Penne before completion.
