= Operation Lustre =

Military action during the Second World War

Operation Lustre was an action during the Second World War: the movement of British and other Allied troops (Australian, Indian, South African, New Zealand, Czech and Polish) from Egypt to Greece in March and April 1941, in response to the failed Italian invasion and the looming threat of German intervention.

== Background ==
Following Italy’s entry into World War II in June 1940, Mussolini’s forces invaded Greece, from occupied Albania, and Egypt, from their colony in Libya. By the Spring of 1941 both these invasions had been defeated; the Greeks had pushed the Italians back into Albania, while in the Western Desert the British Imperial troops had destroyed the invading army and had occupied Cyrenaica. However the threat of intervention by Germany persuaded British leaders, especially Winston Churchill, the British Prime Minister, to commit British forces to the defence of the Greek mainland.

Churchill thought it politically unacceptable not to support Britain's only effective ally in Europe under threat. In addition, use of Greek airfields would put the Romanian oilfields at Ploieşti, vital to Germany's war effort, within reach of Allied bombers. General Archibald Wavell, commander of all the Allied forces in the Middle East, was told in January 1941 that support for Greece must take precedence over all operations in North Africa and this order was reinforced in February.

Wavell's attitude is unclear. It had been generally believed that he was pushed into the Greek campaign, but recent writers believe that Wavell approved of it. British commanders (Note: Alanbrooke (he was not yet CIGS) noted in his diary (11 November) that are we again going to have "Salonica" supporters like the last war. Why will politicians never learn the simple principle of concentration of force at the vital point, and the avoidance of dispersal of effort?) concluded that with British help, the Greek Army could hold the Germans at the Aliakmon Line. They knew German forces were being sent to Libya in Operation Sonnenblume, but thought these forces would be ineffectual until the summer. However, it is now accepted that given the disposition of Greek forces the transfer of further Allied forces to the Greek mainland had no chance of preventing a German victory there, as well as weakening Allied forces in North Africa, leading to the success of Rommel's counterattack in April and the failure of an Allied offensive, Operation Brevity, in May.

Anthony Eden had got Churchill and the British Cabinet’s agreement to send a British force of two divisions to Greece on 7 March. Though claiming that his military advisors concurred, he had not mentioned the provisos by Dill, Wavell and Papagos that eight to ten divisions would be required to hold the Aliakmon Line. It would take 20 days to withdraw three Greek divisions from the frontier line, leaving Wavell with a requirement of five to seven divisions with only the two ANZAC divisions available. Longmore doubted if he could take on the German Air Force in Greece and Albania, and Cunningham doubted if he could protect transport convoys from air attacks.

From 4 March, a series of convoys moved from Alexandria to Piraeus at regular 3-day intervals, escorted by warships of the Royal Navy and the Royal Australian Navy. Although there were air attacks, these had little effect. Since January, when the Italian torpedo boats Lupo and Libra attacked convoy AN 14 off Suda bay and disabled the large tanker Desmoulea for the rest of the war, Allied shipping used to avoid passage into the Aegean Sea through the Kaso strait and chose the Antikithera strait instead, which was west of Crete. The Italian fleet mounted a major attempt at the end of March to disrupt these convoys south of the island, but it ended in the stunning defeat at Cape Matapan.

The Allies initially planned to deploy about 58,000 personnel and their equipment to Greece by 2 April, including the British 1st Armoured Brigade, the New Zealand 2nd Division and the Australian 6th Division. While it was intended that these units would be followed by the Australian 7th Division and the Polish Independent Carpathian Rifle Brigade, neither was deployed before the defeat of the Allies on the Greek mainland.

Two brigades of the New Zealand Division and an Australian brigade were in place on the Aliakmon Line, south-west of Thessaloniki (Salonica), and another Australian brigade and the weak British armoured brigade were blocking Kleidi Pass on the border when the Axis (German, Italian and Bulgarian) invasion (Operation Marita) began on 6 April. The Greek Army did not retire to the Aliakmon Line as expected for fear of being overrun by the more mobile German troops during a retirement and the Allied troops were left vulnerable. These forces had little effect on the German invasion and they were evacuated (Operation Demon) on and after 24 April.

Some of these units were moved to Crete, where they were defeated and forced to evacuate by the airborne invasion of that island (Operation Mercury).

== See also ==
- Battle of Greece
- Operation Sonnenblume
