= Italian ship Ardimentoso =

Ardimentoso has been borne by at least three ships of the Italian Navy and may refer to:

- Italian torpedo boat Ardimentoso (1919), previously the German destroyer S63 awarded to Italy as war reparations by the Treaty of Versailles.
- Italian torpedo boat Ardimentoso (1942), a Ciclone-class torpedo boat launched in 1942 and transferred to the Soviet Union under the designation Z 19 in 1949.
- Italian destroyer Ardimentoso (D 561) a Durand de la Penne-class destroyer launched in 1991 as Ardimentoso but she was renamed Francesco Mimbelli before completion.
