= CA-class submarine =

Italian submarine class

Class overview
- Name: CA class
- Builders: Caproni, Milan
- Operators: Regia Marina
- Succeeded by: CB class
- Built: 1938-41
- In commission: 1938–1943
- Completed: 4

General characteristics (series I, as completed in 1938)
- Type: Midget submarine
- Displacement: 13.5 tonnes (13.3 long tons) (surfaced); 16.4 tonnes (16.1 long tons) (submerged)
- Length: 10 m (32 ft 10 in)
- Beam: 1.96 m (6 ft 5 in)
- Draught: 1.6 m (5 ft 3 in)
- Propulsion: One shaft; 1 × 60 hp (45 kW) diesel engine; 1 × 25 hp (19 kW) electric motor
- Speed: 6.25 kn (12 km/h; 7 mph) (surfaced); 5 knots (9 km/h; 6 mph) (submerged)
- Complement: 2
- Armament: 2 × 17.7 in (450 mm) torpedoes

The CA class were a group of midget submarines built for the Italian Navy during World War II.

== Design ==
These submarines were designed by the Caproni Company and built in great secrecy. They were originally designed for coast defence but later modified as clandestine attack craft similar to the British X craft.

== Boats ==
Name	Series	Builder	Commissioned	Fate
CA 1	I.	Caproni, Taliedo, Kingdom of Italy	15 April 1938	scuttled on 9 September 1943
CA 2	I.	Caproni, Taliedo, Kingdom of Italy	late April 1938	scuttled in 1944
CA 3	II.	Caproni, Taliedo, Kingdom of Italy	January 1943	scuttled on 9 September 1943
CA 4	II.	Caproni, Taliedo, Kingdom of Italy	January 1943	scuttled on 9 September 1943

== Service ==
In 1942, after the United States entered the war, Junio Valerio Borghese, commander of the Decima MAS (the Italian Navy's special operations unit), devised a plan to attack New York Harbor using a CA type midget submarine and commando frogmen. The midget submarine would be transported across the Atlantic by being carried on the deck of a larger submarine. The Italian submarine Leonardo da Vinci was chosen for the task and modified at the Italian base in Bordeaux (BETASOM). CA 2 was transported by rail from Italy and trials, which were conducted near La Pallice, were supervised by Borghese himself during late 1942. Leonardo Da Vinci was sunk in May 1943 before the operation could be carried out. No new boat was available and the Italian Armistice stopped further planning.

== See also ==
- Italian submarines of World War II

== Bibliography ==
- Conway's All the World's Fighting Ships 1922-46
- Kemp, Paul: Underwater Warriors (1996, Arms & Armour Press)
