= Yugoslav submarine Mališan =

CB-class midget submarine

Coordinates: 45.8041°N 15.9638°E

Mališan
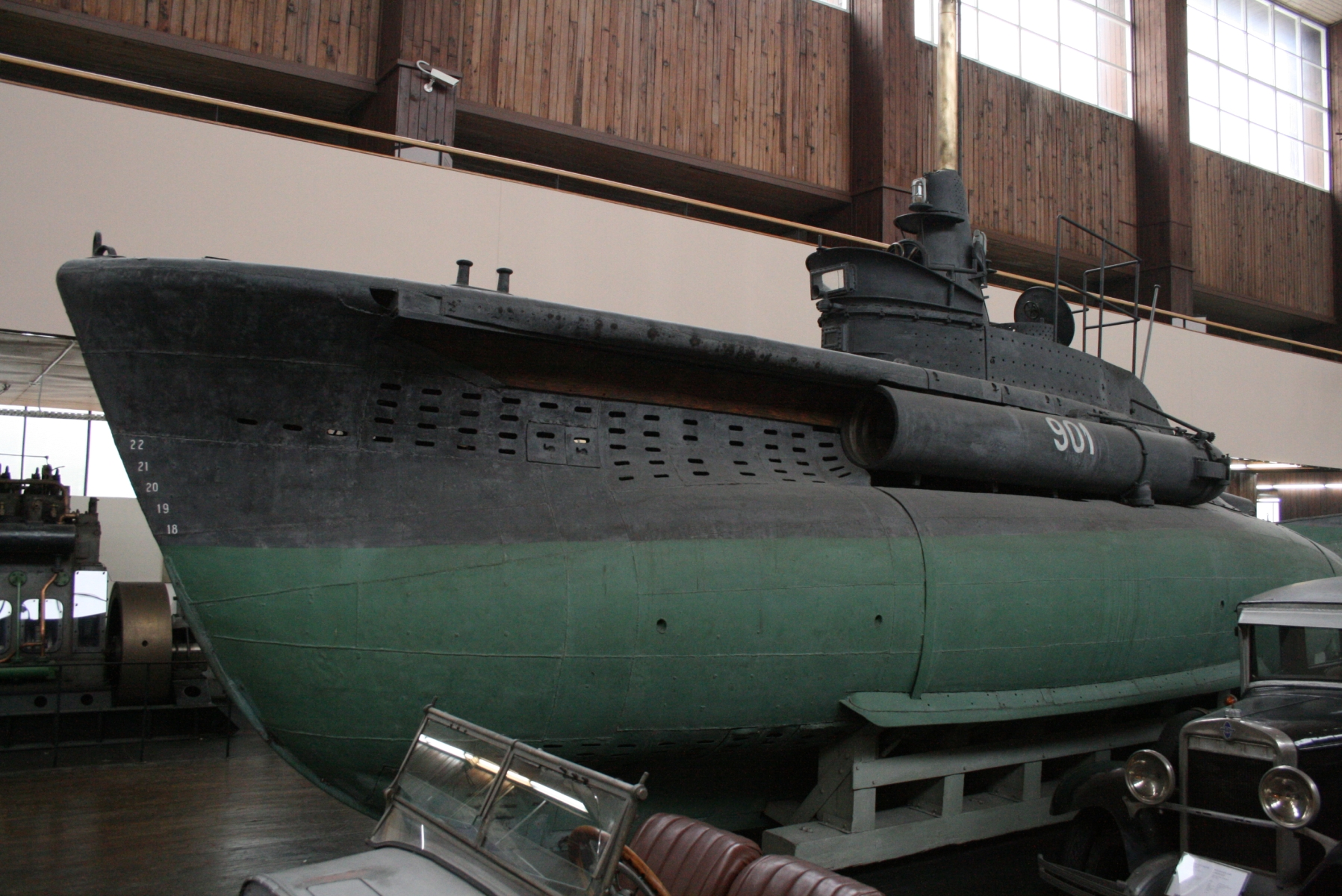
- Mališan at the Technical Museum in Zagreb in 2008 just before restoration began

History

Italy
- Name: CB-20
- Builder: Caproni, Milan, Kingdom of Italy
- Laid down: 1943
- Completed: 1944
- Fate: Captured by the Yugoslav Army at Pola in 1945

Yugoslavia
- Name: Mališan
- Acquired: 1945
- Commissioned: 1953
- Decommissioned: 30 September 1957
- Identification: P-901
- Status: Museum ship at Nikola Tesla Technical Museum, Zagreb

General characteristics
- Class & type: CB
- Type: Midget submarine
- Displacement: 35.4 t (34.8 long tons) (surfaced); 45 t (44 long tons) (submerged)
- Length: 15 m (49 ft 3 in)
- Beam: 3 m (9 ft 10 in)
- Draught: 2.05–3 m (6 ft 9 in – 9 ft 10 in)
- Propulsion: One shaft; diesel-electric; 1 × 88.4 bhp (65.9 kW) diesel engine; 1 × 60 bhp (45 kW) electric motor
- Speed: 7.5 kn (13.9 km/h; 8.6 mph) (surfaced); 6 kn (11 km/h; 6.9 mph) (submerged)
- Range: 1,400 nmi (2,600 km; 1,600 mi) at 5 kn (9.3 km/h; 5.8 mph) (surfaced); 60 nmi (110 km; 69 mi) at 3 kn (5.6 km/h; 3.5 mph) (submerged)
- Test depth: 55 m (180 ft 5 in)
- Crew: 4
- Sensors & processing systems: Sonar
- Armament: 2 × 450 mm (17.7 in) torpedo tubes; 2 × torpedoes; 1 × machine gun

Mališan is a CB-class midget submarine that served in the Yugoslav Navy (Serbo-Croatian: Jugoslavenska ratna mornarica; JRM) from 1953 to 1957. Laid down in 1943 by the Caproni company in Milan as CB-20, she was ordered by the Italian Regia Marina (Royal Navy) during World War II for harbour defence and anti-submarine warfare tasks, but she was incomplete at the time of the Italian surrender in September 1943.

The unfinished boat was captured by the Germans and completed by March 1944. Her main armament consisted of two 450-millimetre (17.7 in) external torpedo tubes located on the sides of the hull, and she had a crew of four. Handed over to the navy of the Italian Social Republic, a wartime German puppet state, she was captured by Yugoslav ground forces in the port of Pola at the end of the war. The repaired boat was commissioned by the JRM and used to train submariners as well as patrol boat crews in anti-submarine warfare. Following her brief Yugoslav service she was donated to the Technical Museum in Zagreb in 1959 as a museum ship.

The submarine had been on display for almost 50 years before undergoing an extensive internal and external restoration beginning in 2008 with collaboration among the museum, the Maritime Institute, the University of Zagreb and private contractors. The restored submarine was put on public display in April 2010. The decision to revert to its original Italian paint scheme and designation as part of the restoration has been criticised.

== Design and construction ==
The Italian Regia Marina (Royal Navy) built various classes of midget submarines for harbour defence and anti-submarine warfare. Mališan was a CB-class midget submarine, which were short boats with a squat hull shape and a non-structural lateral double bottom along two thirds of the hull. The pressure hull contained the control room forward and engine room aft, with the light outer hull including the sail with the conning tower and periscope, and two hatches, one forward and one aft of the sail. Between the sail and the aft hatch was the distress buoy with a telephone. There were also rails on the deck aft of the conning tower. Of the seven ballast tanks, two were load bearing, and the rest were non-structural. The pressure hull had a light transverse bulkhead between the control room and engine room, but this was only to reduce the engine noise in the control room, and was not watertight. The outer light hull tapered to the stern aft of the conning tower, the boats had a straight keel to facilitate transport by road and rail, and had two side keels to enable the boats to rest on the sea bottom while waiting for a target. According to the naval historian Zvonimir Freivogel, the steel used for the outer hull was of poor quality and prone to rust. The single rudder and diving planes were of the semi-balanced type.

Built in Milan by the Caproni company – better known as an aircraft manufacturer – Mališan was laid down in 1943 as CB-20, and was intended for service in the Regia Marina. The boat is 15 m (49 ft 3 in) long, with a 3-metre (9 ft 10 in) beam and had a surfaced draught of 2.05–3 m (6 ft 9 in – 9 ft 10 in). Submerged, it displaced 45 tonnes (44 long tons) compared to 35.4 t (34.8 long tons) when surfaced. Maximum diving depth was 55 m (180 ft 5 in). The wartime complement was four crew members – one officer and three seamen – while in peacetime the boat could be operated by a crew of two. The main armament consisted of two 450-millimetre (17.7 in) external torpedo tubes located on the sides of the hull. Only two torpedoes could be carried, and reloading could only be conducted with assistance as the launching cylinders at the rear of the torpedo tubes had to be removed to insert a fresh torpedo into the tube. One machine gun was mounted on a tripod on the foredeck. According to Freivogel, some sources indicate that two naval mines could be carried instead of the torpedoes. Under the bow, a small sonar dome was installed.

Propulsion for CB-20 consisted of an Isotta Fraschini D 80 diesel engine generating 88.4 brake horsepower (65.9 kW) at 1,850 rpm, and a Marelli Motore Corrente Contina MG 754 S electric motor generating 60 bhp (45 kW) at 1,650 rpm, mounted on a single shaft. The electric motor was powered by 308 batteries which were located under the control room and charged by running the diesel engine on the surface. Previous boats of the class had received a more powerful 100 bhp (75 kW) Brown and Boveri electric motor. The maximum speed was 7.5 knots (13.9 km/h; 8.6 mph) surfaced and 6 kn (11 km/h; 6.9 mph) underwater. When running at full speed on the surface, the boat had a range of only 450 nautical miles (830 km; 520 mi); at a cruising speed of 5 kn (9.3 km/h; 5.8 mph) this increased to 1,400 nmi (2,600 km; 1,600 mi). (Note: According to the Technical Museum, CB-20's surfaced range at 5 kn (9.3 km/h; 5.8 mph) was only 1,000 nmi (1,900 km; 1,200 mi).) Submerged, at a speed of 3 kn (5.6 km/h; 3.5 mph), the range was 60 nmi (110 km; 69 mi). In Italian service, one bunk was installed for use by the crew, and the human endurance expected of the crew was two days at sea. The maximum submerged speed of the CB-class was similar to that of the contemporary British X-class submarine.

== Service history ==
Early boats of the class were deployed to the Black Sea in mid-1942 where they had some successes against submarines of the Soviet Black Sea Fleet. After the surrender of Italy to the Allies on 3 September 1943, CB-20 was about 60 percent completed when she was captured by German forces. She was completed by Caproni in Milan by March 1944 with the intention that she be used for coastal reconnaissance. The boat was then handed over to the navy of the Italian Social Republic (RSI) – a German puppet state formed in northern Italy under Benito Mussolini – and the boat saw service with the 1st Submarine Group Comandante Lombardo of the Decima Flottiglia MAS (Xª MAS), a flotilla performing reconnaissance and landing saboteurs. At some point in September or October 1944, CB-20 was relocated to the naval base at Pola where it was captured by the Yugoslav Army (JA) – formerly the Yugoslav Partisans – on 2 May 1945. At the time of the JA capture of Pola, CB-20's crew attempted to escape, but the boat was damaged by German magnetic mines at the entrance to the harbour, and it was forced to return to Pola. Her crew surrendered, along with other members of the Xª MAS, but they were all later killed by the JA.

Renamed Mališan (Cyrillic: Малишан) – translating as nipper or little boy in English – with the designation P-901 (П-901), the boat was repaired and overhauled at the Uljanik Shipyard at Pula (formerly Pola), where spare parts were cannibalised from other damaged CB-class boats. The rails aft of the conning tower were removed, and a 7.92-millimetre (0.31 in) machine gun was stored inside the boat for mounting forward if needed. While the boat was being repaired, the shipyard drew plans of it, possibly with the intention of using them to build more midget submarines for the Yugoslav Navy (JRM); this did not occur until the Una-class submarines were built in the 1980s.

In 1953, Mališan was commissioned into the JRM, which used it for training new submariners at Pula, and for training patrol boat crews in anti-submarine warfare outside the Pula harbour breakwater and in the Fažana channel between the western coast of Istria and the Brijuni islands. Mališan had to release air bubbles to indicate her position to the patrol boat crews, due to her small size and difficulty of detection. On occasion, senior Yugoslav navy and army officers were brought aboard Mališan for familiarisation purposes. A birthday message for the Yugoslav president Josip Broz Tito was once carried underwater across the bay of Pula by Mališan as part of the annual Relay of Youth, an event that reinforced Tito's cult of personality. She undertook one longer cruise in Yugoslav waters between Pula, Rijeka and Zadar. Due to ongoing maintenance difficulties, Mališan was stricken from the navy list on 30 September 1957.

== Aftermath ==
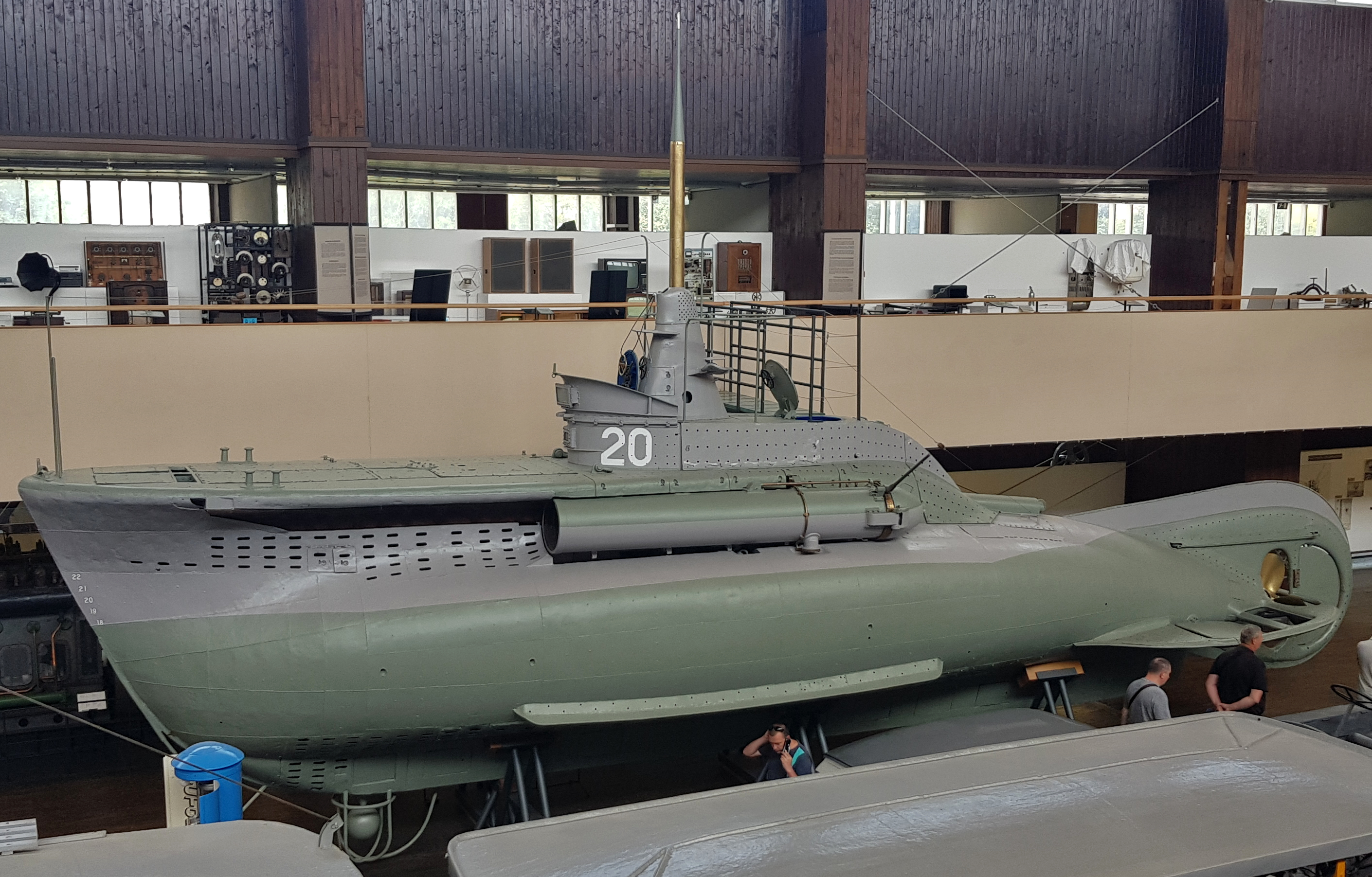
The restored CB-20 at the Nikola Tesla Technical Museum, photographed in 2022

On 3 October 1959, the boat was donated to the Technical Museum (since 2015, the Nikola Tesla Technical Museum) in Zagreb. Her conning tower was removed for rail transport, and the final leg of the boat's journey to Zagreb was on a tank transporter. CB-26, a sister ship which was scuttled at Trieste at the end of World War II, was originally held as part of the Henriquez Collection of War Material at Trieste, and was restored between 1987 and 1995 by a factory owned by a former commander of CB-21. It is now part of the collection of the "Diego de Henriquez" War Museum for Peace in Trieste. According to the Technical Museum, CB-26 was incomplete in 2021 and had been restored in an "inappropriate way" (neodgovarajući način), and the Croatian defence and security journalist Boris Švel reported in 2013 that the interior of CB-26 was in complete disrepair.

In 2007, the Technical Museum decided to restore Mališan, which was beginning to show signs of deterioration. Work started in 2008, and was focused on restoring the interior by dismantling all removable parts from the command section and the engine room. The removed parts were preserved and restored with a detailed documentation about their state before and after restoration. A custom crane had to be constructed and mounted in order to extract the compressor, electric motor and other equipment weighing more than 100 kilograms (220 lb). Work on the exterior began in 2009; the torpedo tubes and the tail section with the propeller were dismantled and restored. The boat itself was raised by 80 cm (31 in) and placed on new supports to make it more accessible for visitors from the museum gallery. This allows visitors to climb down through an original hatch into the submarine. The restoration work was a collaboration among the Technical Museum, the Maritime Institute, the Faculty of Mechanical Engineering and Naval Architecture of the University of Zagreb, and companies Baština d.o.o. and EPO-Oroslavje, and it was supervised by Zoran Kirchhoffer, the senior restorer at the Technical Museum. Work on the exterior also included the restoration of the original Italian paint scheme and name instead of retaining the appearance and designation used during its Yugoslav service. The fully restored boat was placed on public display on 8 April 2010.

The Technical Museum unofficially asserted that the Italian appearance had "greater historical relevance" and the boat had a "more reliably documented history under its original name and flag", but after visiting the exhibit in 2013 Švel observed that the former explanation was hard to accept given that while the Italians had over twenty boats of the class in service, Yugoslavia had only one – Mališan. Švel further questioned why the historical basis for the Italian appearance was more reliably documented. He recommended that the information board alongside CB-20 be expanded to include more information about its Yugoslav service.

== See also ==
- List of ships of the Yugoslav Navy
- List of ship decommissionings in 1957
