= CB-class midget submarine =

World War II Italian submarines

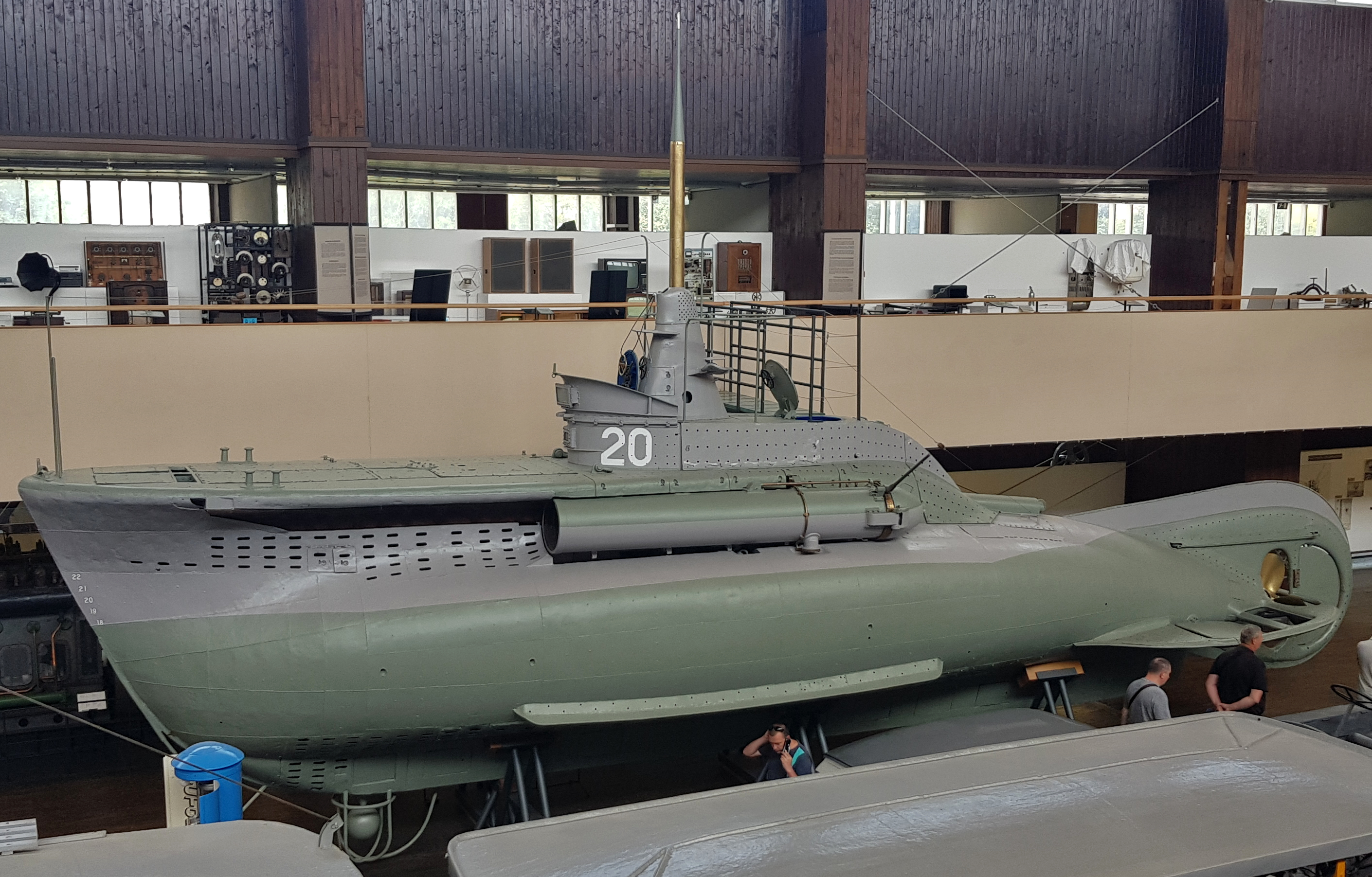
- The former CB-20 in the Technical Museum, Zagreb

Class overview
- Name: CB class
- Builders: Caproni
- Operators: Regia Marina; National Republican Navy; Royal Romanian Navy; Kriegsmarine; Soviet Navy; Yugoslav Navy
- Preceded by: CA class
- Built: 1941–1943
- In commission: 1941–1950s
- Planned: 72
- Completed: 21
- Preserved: 2

General characteristics
- Type: Midget submarine
- Displacement: 35.4 tons surfaced; 44.3 tons submerged
- Length: 15.00 m (49 ft 3 in)
- Beam: 3.00 m (9 ft 10 in)
- Draught: 2.05 m (6 ft 9 in)
- Propulsion: 1 diesel engine, 1 electric motor, 1 shaft
- Speed: 7.5 knots (13.9 km/h; 8.6 mph) surfaced; 7 knots (13 km/h; 8.1 mph) submerged
- Complement: 4
- Armament: 2 x 450 mm torpedoes (could be replaced by 2 mines)

The CB class was a group of midget submarines built for the Italian Navy during World War II. However, they were also used by several other navies, seeing action in the Mediterranean and in the Black Sea.

== Construction and specifications ==
The submarines were designed and built by Caproni. They were used as coastal defence units, being a significant improvement of the previous CA class. Each unit had a standard (surfaced) displacement of 35.4 tons and a submerged displacement of 44.3 tons. They measured 15 metres (49 ft 3 in) in length, had a beam of 3 metres (9 ft 10 in) and a draught of 2.05 metres (6 ft 9 in). Power plant consisted of one Isotta Fraschini diesel engine and one Brown Boveri electric motor, both generating a total of 97 kilowatts (130 hp) powering a single shaft, resulting in a surfaced top speed of 7.5 knots (13.9 km/h; 8.6 mph) and a submerged top speed of 7 knots (13 km/h; 8.1 mph). Each boat was armed with two externally-mounted 450-millimetre (18 in) torpedoes, each tube could be reloaded without removing the vessel from water. The two torpedoes could also be replaced by two mines. Each boat had a crew of four, aided in navigation by a small conning tower.

== Service ==
Seventy-two boats were ordered from Caproni in Milan, but only 22 were laid down. Twelve boats were completed before the Italian Armistice and nine afterwards.

=== Black Sea ===
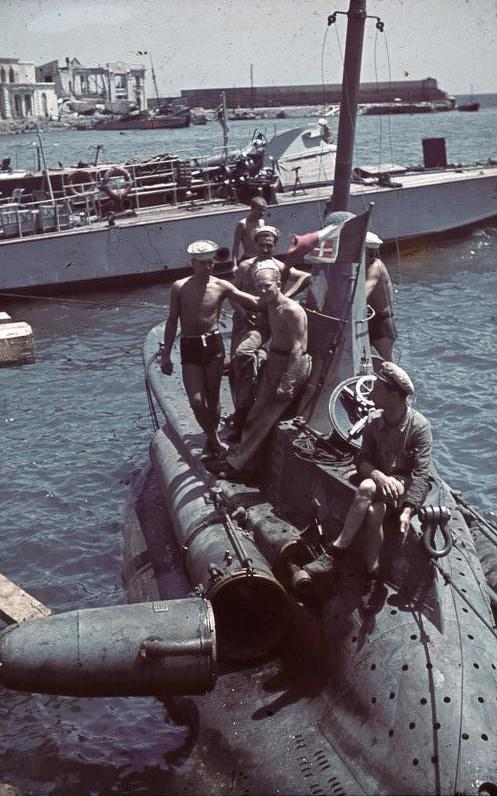
A group of Italian sailors from the Quarta Flottiglia MAS atop a CB-class submarine in Crimea

The first six boats, completed in 1941, were transferred to the Black Sea by rail, after Nazi Germany asked for Italian naval support on the Eastern Front. They departed on 25 April 1942 and reached the Romanian port of Constanța on 2 May. They formed the 1st Squadriglia Sommergibili CB, under the overall command of Francesco Mimbelli. They fought against the Soviet Black Sea Fleet, CB-5 being sunk at Yalta in June 1942, either by Soviet aircraft or by a torpedo boat. In late 1942, the remaining five submarines were refitted at the Constanța Shipyard in Romania. On 26 August 1943, CB-4 torpedoed and sank the Soviet Shchuka-class submarine Shch-203.

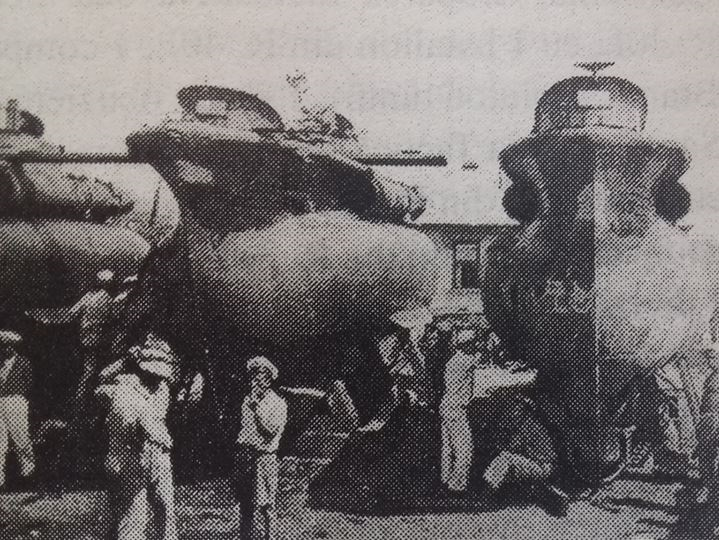
The Black Sea submarines under Romanian control, late 1943

After the Allied armistice with Italy in September 1943, the five Black Sea submarines (CB-1, CB-2, CB-3, CB-4 and CB-6) were transferred to the Royal Romanian Navy. They were all scuttled in the Black Sea in August 1944, after King Michael's Coup.

Four of the Black Sea submarines (CB-1, CB-2, CB-3 and CB-4) were captured by Soviet forces in August 1944 and commissioned on 20 October as TM-4, TM-5, TM-6 and TM-7. They were stricken on 16 February 1945 and subsequently scrapped.

=== Mediterranean ===
The first six boats were unsuccessfully employed as submarine hunters near Naples and Salerno, before being transferred to the Black Sea in early 1942. The second squadron (CB-7, CB-8, CB-9, CB-10, CB-11, CB-12) was completed just before the Armistice, in August 1943. All of them, except CB-7 (later cannibalized for spare parts), remained in the italian navy when Italy joined the Allies. CB-13, CB-14, CB-15 and CB-16 were captured by the Germans, but all except CB-16 were destroyed by Allied air attacks. CB-16 was assigned to the 10th Flotilla of the National Republican Navy, the navy of the Italian Social Republic, but its crew mutinied and surrendered the boat to the British. The last squadron to be completed carried out patrol missions and landed saboteurs. CB-17 was sunk during an air attack, CB-18 was scuttled by her own crew, CB-19 was turned over to the Allies, CB-20 was captured by Yugoslav Partisans, CB-21 was accidentally rammed by a German landing craft and CB-22 was either sunk in an air attack or scuttled by her own crew.

== List of submarines ==
Submarine	Completed	Service / Fate
CB-1	27 January 1941	Transferred to the Black Sea. To Romania after September 1943. Scuttled August 1944, raised by USSR and commissioned as TM-4, scrapped 1945
CB-2	27 January 1941	Transferred to the Black Sea. To Romania after September 1943. Scuttled August 1944, raised by USSR and commissioned as TM-5, scrapped 1945
CB-3	10 May 1941	Transferred to the Black Sea. To Romania after September 1943. Scuttled August 1944, raised by USSR and commissioned as TM-6, scrapped 1945
CB-4	10 May 1941	Transferred to the Black Sea. To Romania after September 1943. Scuttled August 1944, raised by USSR and commissioned as TM-7, scrapped 1945
CB-5	10 May 1941	Transferred to the Black Sea, sunk by Soviet aircraft or torpedo boat near Yalta, 13 June 1942
CB-6	10 May 1941	Transferred to the Black Sea. To Romania after September 1943. Scuttled August 1944
CB-7	1 August 1943	Captured by Germany at Pola September 1943. Cannibalized for spare parts.
CB-8	1 August 1943	Surrendered to Britain 1943, scrapped 1948
CB-9	1 August 1943	Surrendered to Britain 1943, scrapped 1948
CB-10	1 August 1943	Surrendered to Britain 1943, scrapped 1948
CB-11	24 August 1943	Surrendered to Britain 1943, scrapped 1948
CB-12	24 August 1943	Surrendered to Britain 1943, scrapped 1948
CB-13	Late 1943	Captured by Germany 1943. Transferred to Italian Social Republic, sunk by Allied aircraft 23 March 1945
CB-14	Late 1943	Captured by Germany 1943. Transferred to Italian Social Republic, sunk during air raid
CB-15	Late 1943	Captured by Germany 1943. Transferred to Italian Social Republic, sunk during air raid
CB-16	Late 1943	Captured by Germany 1943. Transferred to Italian Social Republic, sunk during air raid
CB-17	Late 1943	Captured by Germany 1943. Transferred to Italian Social Republic, sunk by Allied aircraft 3 April 1945
CB-18	Late 1943	Captured by Germany 1943. Transferred to Italian Social Republic, sunk 31 March 1945
CB-19	Late 1943	Captured by Germany 1943. Transferred to Italian Social Republic, broken up 1947
CB-20	Late 1943	Captured by Germany 1943. Transferred to Italian Social Republic. Captured by Yugoslav partisans in Pola at the end of the war. In active service in Yugoslav Navy 1950–1957 as P-901. Donated to the Technical Museum in Zagreb in 1959
CB-21	Late 1943	Captured by Germany 1943. Transferred to Italian Social Republic, rammed and sunk by a Marinefährprahm in the Adriatic 29 April 1945
CB-22		Captured by Germany in 1943, sunk by air raid or scuttled. Wreck salvaged and preserved in Trieste

== See also ==
- Italian submarines of World War II
