= Italian destroyer Luigi Durand de la Penne =

Durand de la Penne-class guided missile destroyer

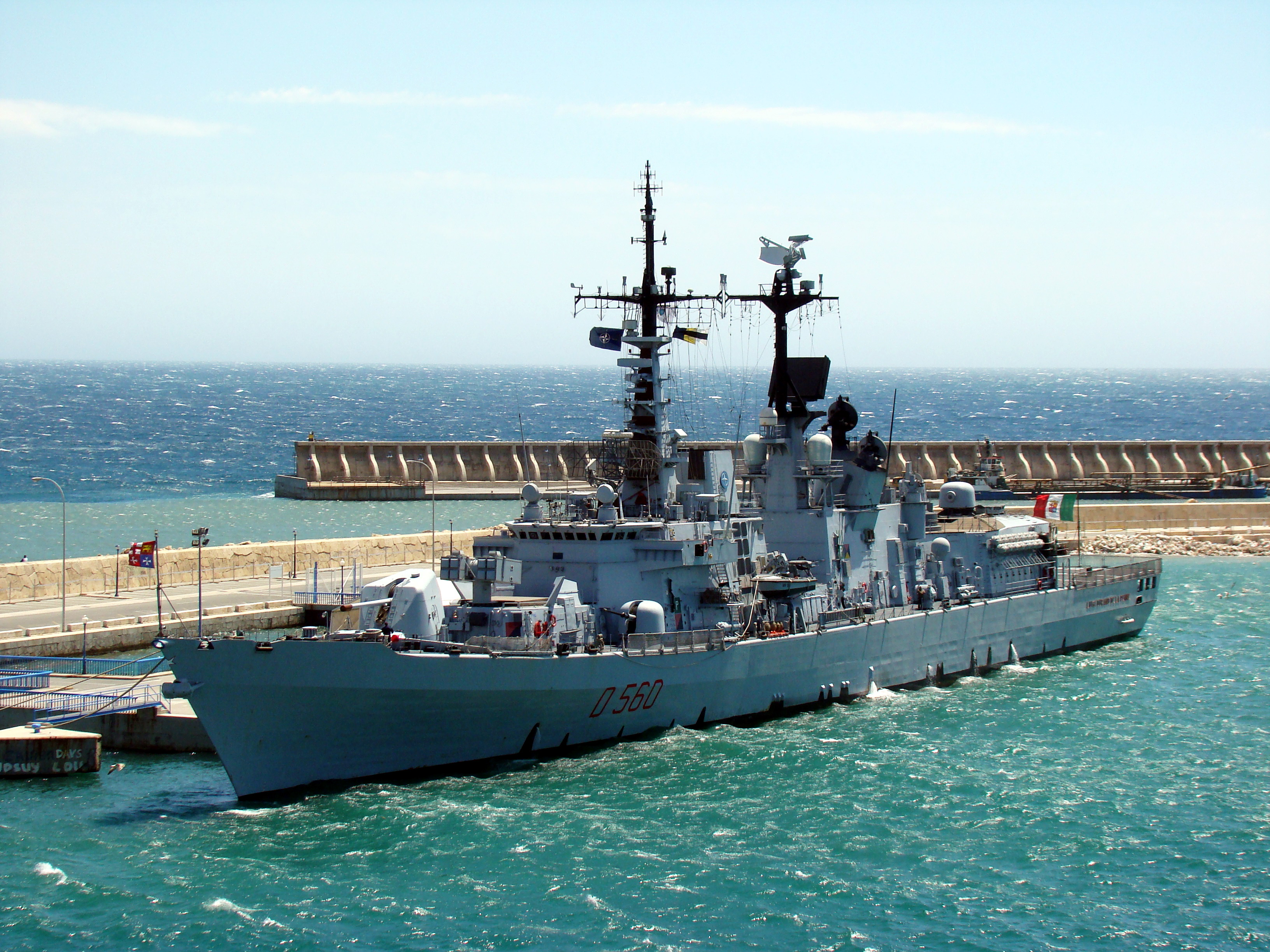
- Luigi Durand de la Penne on 25 April 2009

History

Italy
- Name: Luigi Durand de la Penne
- Namesake: Luigi Durand de la Penne
- Builder: Fincantieri, Riva Trigoso shipyards
- Laid down: 20 January 1988
- Launched: 20 October 1989
- Commissioned: 18 March 1993
- Decommissioned: 1 October 2024
- Identification: MMSI number: 247885000; Callsign: IADP; Pennant number: D 560
- Motto: Utique vince; (Win at all cost)
- Status: Retired

General characteristics
- Class & type: Durand de la Penne-class destroyer
- Displacement: 4,500 t (4,400 long tons), standard; 5.560 t (5.472 long tons), full load
- Length: 147.7 m (484 ft 7 in)
- Beam: 16.1 m (52 ft 10 in)
- Draught: 5 m (16 ft 5 in)
- Propulsion: CODOG scheme: 2 × General Electric/Avio LM2500 gas turbines providing 41,000 kW (55,000 hp); 2 × diesel engines Grandi Motori Trieste BL-230-20-DVM 9,396 kW (12,600 hp); 6 x diesel engine generators Fincantieri DMD 203-6
- Speed: 32 knots (59 km/h; 37 mph)
- Range: 7,000 nmi (13,000 km; 8,100 mi) at 18 knots (33 km/h; 21 mph)
- Complement: 380
- Sensors & processing systems: 1 × SPS-52C 3D radar; 1 × AESN MM/SPS-768 radar; 1 × medium range AESN MM/SPS-774; 1 × surface radar AMS MM/SPS-702; 1 × navigation radar SMA MM/SPN-703; 4 × AESN Orion RTN-30X (MM/SPG-76); 1 × sonar system DE-1164/1167; 1 × TACAN URN-25; 1 × SADOC-2 combat system
- Electronic warfare & decoys: - ECM system Elettronica SLQ-732 NETTUNO; 2 x SAGEM Sagaie decoy launching system; ASW AN/SLQ-25 Nixie, Surface Ship Torpedo Defense (SSTD) System
- Armament: 1 × Otobreda 127 mm gun; 3 × Oto Melara 76/62 mm Super Rapido gun; 1 × Albatross octuple launcher for Selenia Aspide SAM; 1 × Mk 13 launcher with 40 Standard SM-1MR missiles; 4 × OTOMAT Mk2 SSMs; 4 × Milas anti submarine missile; 2 × 324 mm triple torpedo launchers WASS B515/3
- Aircraft carried: 2 helicopters
- Aviation facilities: double hangar

Luigi Durand de la Penne (D 560) is the lead ship of the Durand de la Penne-class destroyers of the Italian Navy.

== Development ==
The Durand de Le Penne class are escort and combat class ships, able to operate in every combat condition, and especially devised to survive to heavy missile and aircraft attacks. Its construction is made almost totally with steel; the structure is a continuous deck with a low, large stern, to accommodate the helicopter force. The fore hull is very pointed, with a very pronounced sea-cutter structure. The superstructure consists of two blocks, relatively low and wide, both with a high, antenna mast with a triangular cross-section for all the electronic. The engines exhausts are in two groups, one for each superstructure: the aft has two exhausts flank to flank, slightly inclined. Then there is the Standard missile system and finally the helicopter facilities.

== Construction and career ==
She is laid down on 20 January 1988 and launched on 20 October 1989 by Fincantieri shipyards initially under the name Animoso, named after the same torpedo boat which served during World War II. Commissioned on 18 March 1993 with the hull number D 560.

Luigi Durand de la Penne entered Odesa Port, Ukraine, on 4 September 2019. She met the cadets at Odesa Maritime Academy.

25 August 2020, Luigi Durand de la Penne conducted an exercise with TCG Goksu in the Eastern Mediterranean Sea. As of August 29, 2024, she was docked in Valletta Harbour, Malta.

After 31 years of service, She was decommissioned on 1 October 2024 along with Italian aircraft carrier Giuseppe Garibaldi.
