= Italian destroyer Francesco Mimbelli =

Durand de la Penne-class guided missile destroyer

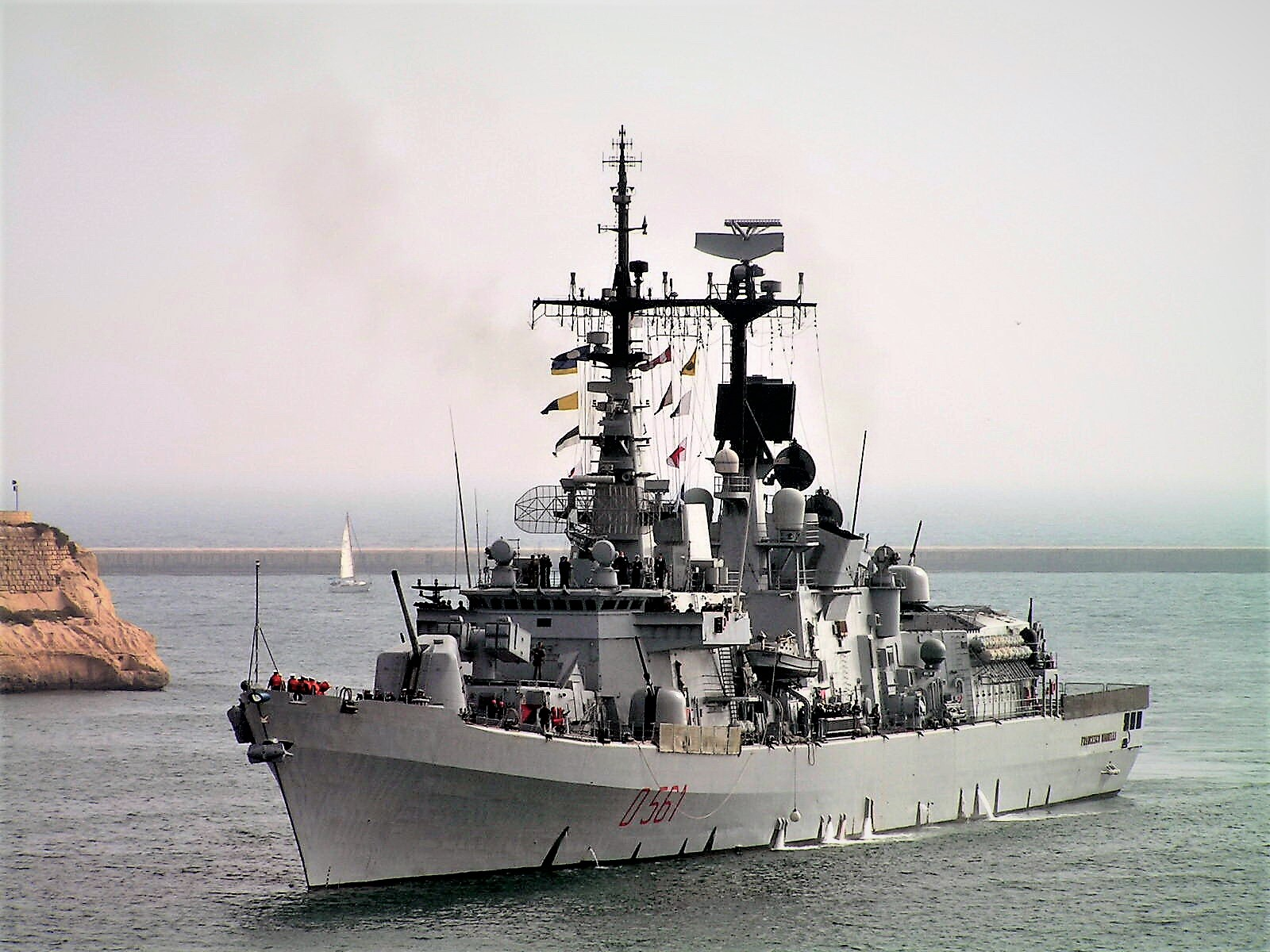
- Francesco Mimbelli entering La Valletta, Malta on 17 May 2005

History

Italy
- Name: Francesco Mimbelli
- Namesake: Francesco Mimbelli
- Builder: Fincantieri, Riva Trigoso shipyards
- Laid down: 15 November 1989
- Launched: 13 April 1991
- Commissioned: 18 October 1993
- Identification: Callsign: IAFM; Pennant number: D 561
- Motto: Audendum est; (It is to be dared)
- Status: Active

General characteristics
- Class & type: Durand de la Penne-class destroyer
- Displacement: - 4,500 t (4,400 long tons), standard; - 5.560 t (5.472 long tons), full load
- Length: 147.7 m (484 ft 7 in)
- Beam: 16.1 m (52 ft 10 in)
- Draught: 5 m (16 ft 5 in)
- Propulsion: CODOG scheme: 2 × General Electric/Avio LM2500 gas turbines providing 41,000 kW (55,000 hp); 2 × diesel engines Grandi Motori Trieste BL-230-20-DVM 9,396 kW (12,600 hp); 6 x diesel engine generators Fincantieri DMD 203-6
- Speed: 32 knots (59 km/h; 37 mph)
- Range: 7,000 nmi (13,000 km; 8,100 mi) at 18 knots (33 km/h; 21 mph)
- Complement: 380
- Sensors & processing systems: 1 × SPS-52C 3D radar; 1 × AESN MM/SPS-768 radar; 1 × medium range AESN MM/SPS-774; 1 × surface radar AMS MM/SPS-702; 1 × navigation radar SMA MM/SPN-703; 4 × AESN Orion RTN-30X (MM/SPG-76); 1 × sonar system DE-1164/1167; 1 × TACAN URN-25; 1 × SADOC-2 combat system
- Electronic warfare & decoys: ECM system Elettronica SLQ-732 NETTUNO; 2 x SAGEM Sagaie decoy launching system; ASW AN/SLQ-25 Nixie, Surface Ship Torpedo Defense (SSTD) System
- Armament: 1 × Otobreda 127 mm gun; 3 × Oto Melara 76/62 mm Super Rapido gun; 1 × Albatross octuple launcher for Selenia Aspide SAM; 1 × Mk 13 launcher with 40 Standard SM-1MR missiles; 4 × OTOMAT Mk2 SSMs; 4 × Milas anti submarine missile; 2 × 324 mm triple torpedo launchers WASS B515/3
- Aircraft carried: 2 helicopters
- Aviation facilities: Double hangar

Francesco Mimbelli (D 561) is the second ship of the Durand de la Penne-class destroyers of the Italian Navy.

== Development ==
The Durand de Le Penne class are escort and combat class ships, able to operate in every combat condition, and especially devised to survive to heavy missile and aircraft attacks. Its construction is made almost totally with steel; the structure is a continuous deck with a low, large stern, to accommodate the helicopter force. The fore hull is very pointed, with a very pronounced sea-cutter structure. The superstructure consists of two blocks, relatively low and wide, both with a high, antenna mast with a triangular cross-section for all the electronic. The engines exhausts are in two groups, one for each superstructure: the aft has two exhausts flank to flank, slightly inclined. Then there is the Standard missile system and finally the helicopter facilities.

== Construction and career ==
She was laid down on 15 November 1989 and launched on 13 April 1991 by Fincantieri shipyards initially under the name Ardimentoso, named after the same torpedo boat which served during World War II. Commissioned on 18 October 1993 with the hull number D 561.

Francesco Mimbelli suffered a fire in one of the engine rooms, while it was underway, as part of Operation Safe Sea on 29 December 2019. The fire-fighting teams on board, specially trained to deal with these emergencies, intervened effectively, immediately securing the unit and extinguishing the fire, without any consequences or damage to the crew. The ship continued its navigation autonomously and is now heading towards the port of Augusta, for the necessary checks.

== Gallery ==
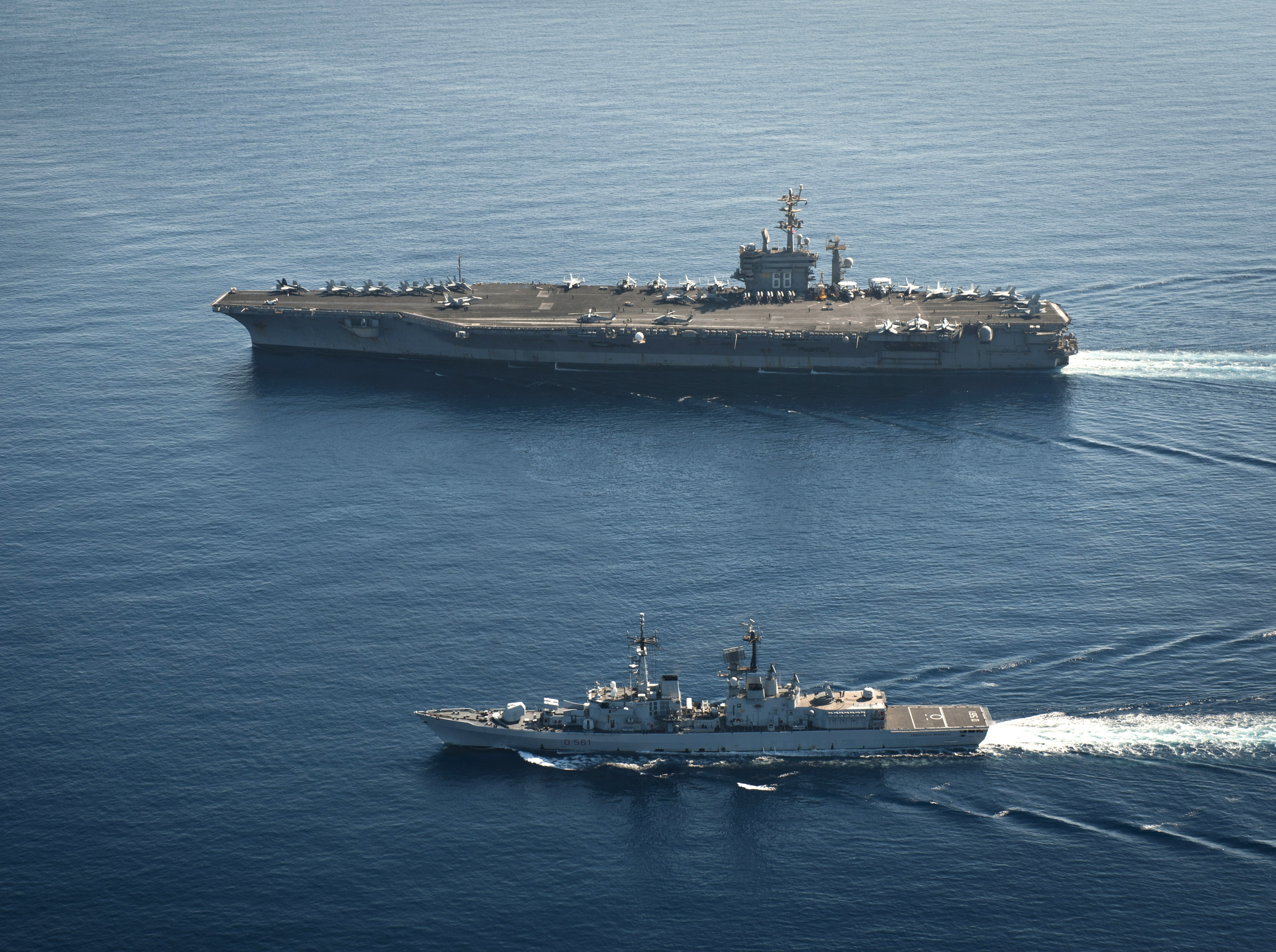
USS Nimitz and Francesco Mimbelli alongside each other in the Mediterranean Sea on 26 October 2013

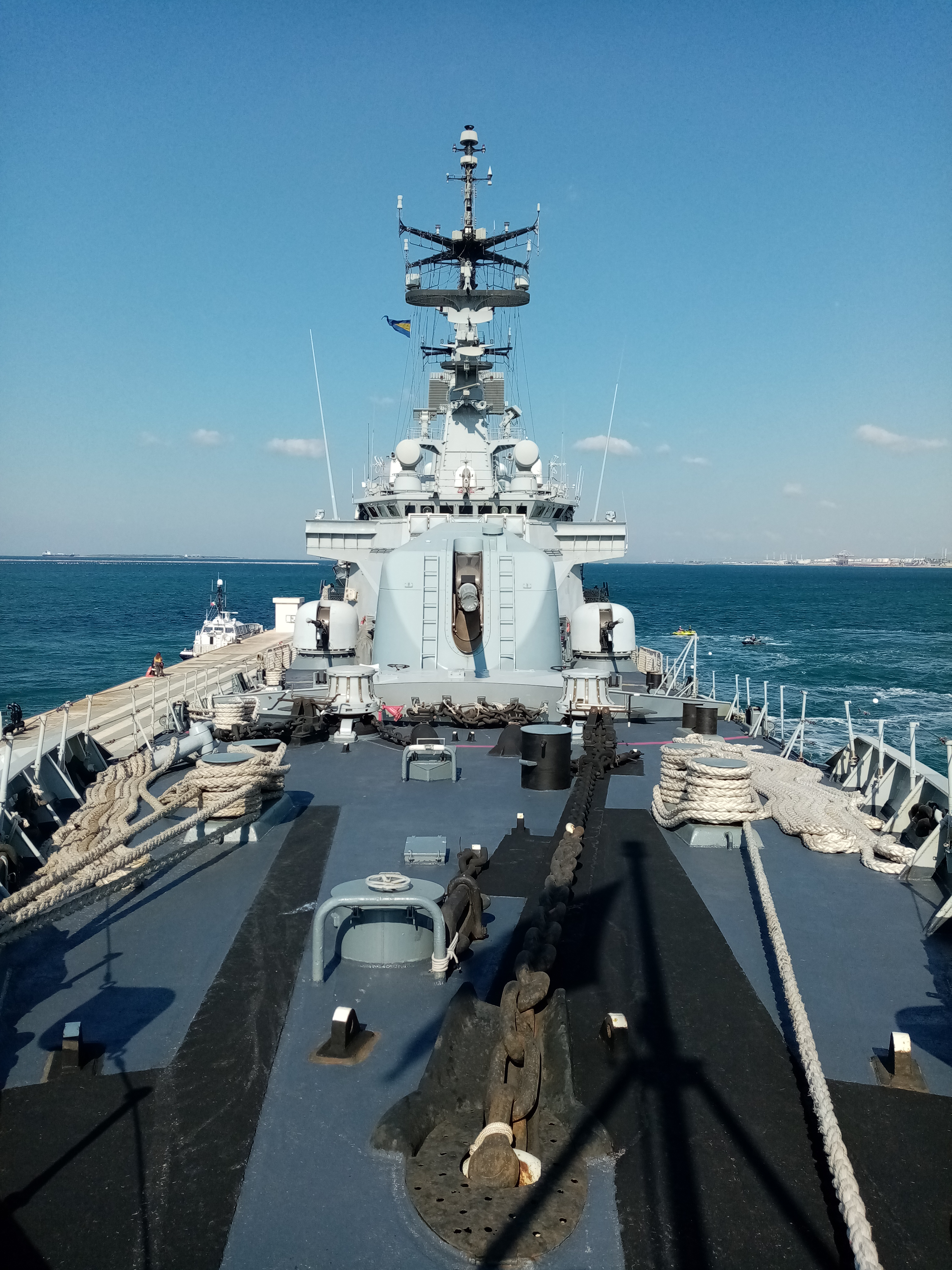
Bow view of the forward main guns of Francesco Mimbelli on 14 September 2019
