= Attack on Convoy AN 14 =

Naval engagement during World War II

Coordinates: 35°33′32″N 25°34′14″E

- Part of The Battle of the Mediterranean of the Second World War and the Greco-Italian War
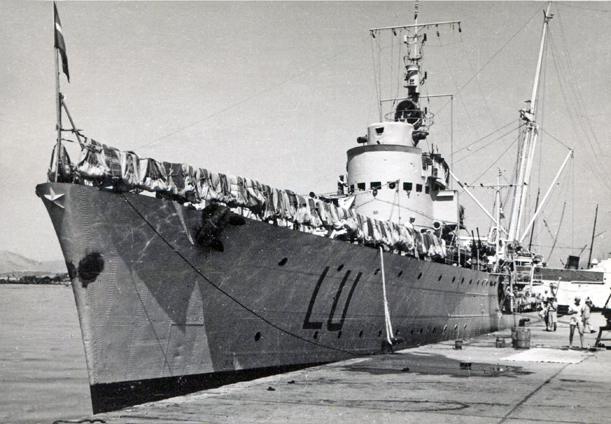
- Italian torpedo boat Lupo
Date	31 January 1941
Location	The Kasos Strait between Crete and Kasos in the Aegean Sea
Result	Italian victory

Belligerents
Italy	United Kingdom; Australia; Greece

Commanders and leaders
Francesco Mimbelli	Herbert Packer

Units involved
Lupo; Libra	

Strength
2 torpedo boats	3 light cruisers; 2 destroyers; 2 corvettes; 9 merchant ships; 1 tanker

Casualties and losses
None	1 seaman killed 1 tanker disabled
- Site of the attack on Desmoulea

The Attack on Convoy AN 14 was a naval engagement during the Second World War between a British naval force defending a convoy of merchant ships, sailing from Port Said and Alexandria to Piraeus in Greece and two Italian torpedo boats which intercepted them north of the island of Crete on 31 January 1941. The Italian vessels, Lupo and Libra launched two torpedoes each. The torpedoes fired by Libra missed their target but one from Lupo hit the 8,120 GRT British tanker Desmoulea which had to be towed to Suda Bay in Crete and beached; the ship was disabled for the rest of the war. One other merchant ship turned back; the other eight vessels reached Piraeus.

== Background ==
When the Italo-Greek War commenced between Fascist Italy and Greece on 28 October 1940, the British began to send aircraft and stores through the Aegean Sea to support the Greek war effort. The Greek government provided the Allies with tugs, harbour vessels and a naval base for the British Mediterranean Fleet at Suda Bay in Crete. Greece and Britain had concluded a co-operation agreement in January 1940, which secured commercial relations and made the Greek merchant fleet available for the transport of war supplies to the Allies, before the Italo–Greek War began.

== Prelude ==
=== Italian navy ===
Since the declaration of the war with the Allies on 10 June 1940, Italian naval forces in the Dodecanese were limited in their capacity to supply garrisons. Most stores were carried by submarine and aircraft but the expedient was insufficient and the Italians began to use coastal ships. The ships ferried 4,500 long tons (4,600 t) of supplies to the Dodecanese, even after the closing of the Corinth Canal during the Italo-Greek War. A flotilla of torpedo boats were deployed in the area by the Regia Marina in December 1940, under the command of captain Francesco Mimbelli, to reinforce the ships around Rhodes and Leros, whose naval base of Porto Lago (Lakki) was the main base of the Regia Marina in the Aegean.

=== Convoy AN 14 ===
Convoy AN (Aegean Northward) 14 consisted of the British ships Destro (3,553 gross register tons ([GRT]), Goldmouth (7,402 GRT), Harmattan (4,558 GRT), Desmoulea (8,120 GRT), Levernbank (5,150 GRT) and three Greek merchant ships, Mount Olympus (6,692 GRT), Nicolaos G. Culucundis (3,201 GRT) and Spyros (6,629 GRT). The convoy was escorted by the light cruiser HMS Calcutta (Commander Herbert Packer), the destroyers HMS Dainty and Jaguar and the corvettes HMS Peony and Gloxina. The bulk of the convoy sailed from Port Said on 28 January, with the corvette Gloxina. Levernbank and the large tanker Desmoulea, escorted by Calcutta and Peony, departed Alexandria on 29 January. The troop transport Ethiopia (5,574 GRT) carrying RAF personnel, left Alexandria some hours later, with the destroyer HMS Hasty. The cruiser HMS Ajax and the Australian light cruiser HMAS Perth were to provide distant cover; Jaguar and Dainty swept the Kasos Strait ahead of the convoy.

== Action ==
Italian torpedo boat Libra

Convoy AN 14 had sailed from Port Said on 28 and 29 January; on 31 January 1941, the Italian torpedo boats departed Leros and while performing an anti-submarine search in the Kasos Strait, they spotted an Allied convoy, escorted by a cruiser and three destroyers. (Note: This website erroneously states that the torpedo boat Lince was involved but it was escorting a steamer from the Dodecanese.) The two vessels separated, Libra to distract the escort, while Lupo attacked with its 450 mm (18 in) torpedoes. The Italians reported that Lupo hit a large steamer with two torpedoes and then Libra launched another two at a cruiser without effect. The Italians were engaged by the escorts but managed to escape.

In the British account, only one torpedo hit the tanker Desmoulea, which was loaded with a cargo of petrol and white oils. Admiral Andrew Cunningham recorded that the tanker had been detached to Suda Bay from the Alexandria section of the convoy and was torpedoed at 18:00 on 31 January. Dainty, the close escort, took the tanker in tow at 20:00, after it been abandoned by its crew. Perth assisted but then Cunningham ordered Perth to resume its escort duties. Desmoulea had been hit abreast the engine room and left sinking but the crew re-boarded the tanker when it became clear that it was still afloat. Desmoulea arrived in Suda Bay under tow at 08:00 on 1 February and beached with its cargo intact. Peony survived an attack by bombers 40 nmi (46 mi; 74 km) from Crete and the rest of the convoy reached Piraeus on 2 February 1941.

== Aftermath ==
=== Analysis ===
Along with torpedo damage inflicted on the cargo ship Clan Cumming on 19 January by the Italian submarine Neghelli, which was eventually destroyed by the escorts, this was the only Italian success against British convoys in the Aegean Sea. After the action, Allied shipping made passage into the Aegean through the more westerly Antikythera Strait.

=== Subsequent events ===
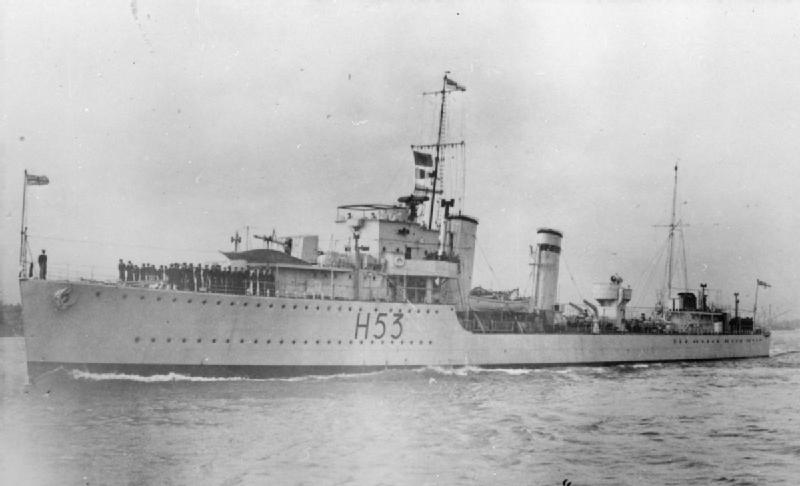
HMS Dainty

Desmoulea remained at Suda Bay for several weeks, down on the sandy bottom by the stern, with its after well deck awash; the cargo was transferred to the tanker Eocene. Desmoulea was towed by the armed boarding vessel HMS Chakla and escorted to Port Said by the anti-submarine trawlers HMT Lydiard and HMT Amber. The ship arrived on 6 May and moored off the western beacon of Suez, for use as a temporary storage vessel. While awaiting repairs, Desmoulea was torpedoed again on 3 August 1941 by German bombers, the explosion tearing a hole 35 ft × 12 ft (10.7 m × 3.7 m) in its side. Desmoulea was towed to Aden on 27 April by Olivia (6,250 GRT) and waited for the end of the monsoon, inspection revealing that it had a broken back, was hogged by 4 ft (1.2 m), with little strength, no power, no steering and a flooded engine-room.

The ship resumed its voyage on 30 December towed by Malda (9,066 GRT) and arrived at Bombay on 12 January 1942. After waiting for a dry dock until 23 April, it was towed by Ondina to Bhavnagar, arriving on 1 May, beaching in a small river, making its hull damage worse. On 20 November, the Norwegian Utsire (4,441 GRT) began towing Desmoulea but after two days, the tow line parted and the ship went aground at Goapnath Point. After four days, a tug refloated the ship which was returned to Bombay and used as an oil storage ship. Desmoulea went into dry dock in July 1943 and was found to be repairable and in November, renamed Empire Thane it was towed to Cochin and used as a storage hulk. In 1947 Desmoulea returned to its pre-war ownership and name. The vessel began a tow to Britain on 21 April, arriving at Falmouth on 16 July. Desmoulea was rebuilt under its original name in 1949, before being laid up in 1955 and scrapped in 1961.

=== Casualties ===
The Third Engineering Officer, George Donn, was killed in the action.

== British order of battle ==
=== Merchant ships ===
Merchantmen
Ship	Year	Flag	GRT	Notes
SS Destro	1920	Merchant Navy	3,553	
SS Goldmouth	1927	Merchant Navy	7,402	
SS Harmattan	1930	Merchant Navy	4,558	
SS Katerina		Merchant Navy		Did not sail
Desmoulea	1939	Merchant Navy	8,120	Damaged by a torpedo
Levernbank	1925	Merchant Navy	5,150	
SS Mount Olympus	1920	Greece	6,692	
SS Nicolaos G. Culucundis	1917	Greece	3,201	
SS Spyros	1918	Greece	6,629	

=== Convoy escorts ===
Convoy escorts
Ship	Flag	Type	Notes
HMS Calcutta	Royal Navy	C-class cruiser	
HMS Dainty	Royal Navy	D-class destroyer	
HMS Jaguar	Royal Navy	J-class destroyer	
HMS Peony	Royal Navy	Flower-class corvette	
HMS Gloxina	Royal Navy	Flower-class corvette	

=== Distant cover ===
Convoy escorts
Ship	Flag	Type	Notes
HMS Ajax	Royal Navy	Leander-class cruiser	
HMAS Perth	Royal Navy	Leander-class cruiser	

=== Other sailings ===
Other sailings
Ship	Flag	Type	Notes
HMS Hasty	Royal Navy	H-class destroyer	
SS Ethiopia	Merchant Navy	1922	Troopship (5,574 GRT)

== Italian order of battle ==
Italian torpedo boats
Ship	Flag	Type	Notes
Libra	Kingdom of Italy	Spica-class torpedo boat	
Lupo	Kingdom of Italy	Spica-class torpedo boat	Torpedoed and damaged Desmoulea

== See also ==
- Attack on Convoy BN 7
- Operation Harpoon
