= Italian torpedo boat Lupo =

1937 Spica-class torpedo boat

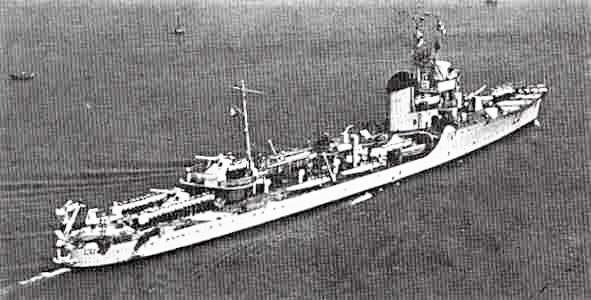
- Torpedo boat Lupo

History

Italy
- Name: Lupo
- Builder: CNQ, Fiume
- Laid down: 7 December 1936
- Launched: 7 November 1937
- Commissioned: 20 February 1938
- Identification: LP/LU
- Fate: Sunk, 2 December 1942

General characteristics
- Class & type: Spica-class torpedo boat
- Displacement: 670 long tons (680 t) standard; 1,030 long tons (1,050 t) full load
- Length: 82 m (269 ft 0 in)
- Beam: 7.92 m (26 ft 0 in)
- Draught: 2.82 m (9 ft 3 in)
- Propulsion: 2 Yarrow boilers, 2 Tosi steam turbines, 2 shafts; 19,000 hp (14,200 kW)
- Speed: 34 knots (39 mph; 63 km/h)
- Complement: 110
- Armament: 3 × 100 mm (4 in) / 47 caliber guns; 8 × 13.2 mm (0.52 in) anti-aircraft machine guns (replaced by 3 x twin 20mm cannon by May 1941); 4 × 450 mm (18 in) torpedo tubes; 2 × DCTs; Up to 20 mines

The Italian torpedo boat Lupo was a Spica-class torpedo boat built for the Regia Marina in the late 1930s. During the Second World War, Lupo was involved in several naval actions, including that of the eponymous "Lupo convoy", for which she was awarded the Silver Medal of Military Valour. Lupo was sunk in action on 2 December 1942.

== Construction ==
Lupo was built in the late inter-war period by CNQ, Fiume, one of the Alcione sub-group of the numerous Spica class of torpedo boats. She was laid down on 7 December 1936, launched 7 November 1937, and commissioned 20 February 1938. Lupo was armed with three 100 mm guns in single mounts, and four 450 mm torpedo tubes; she also had two depth charge throwers and equipment for laying mines. The Spica class ships all bore astronomical names; Lupo was named for the constellation Lupus, the wolf.

== Service history ==
At the entrance of Italy into the Second World War Lupo was stationed at Rhodes, as leader of the VIII Torpedo Boat squadron with sister ships Lince, Libra and Lira. There she was involved in escort duties and actions in the war against Greece. In December 1940 Lupo and the VIII Sqdn came under the command of Frigate Captain Francesco Mimbelli, with whom she would achieve fame.

On 31 January 1941, with Libra in company, Lupo attacked British convoy AN 14, en route to Piraeus. Despite the escort of three destroyers Lupo was able to torpedo the tanker Desmoulea, which was unable to complete her journey. The disabled Desmoulea was towed to Bombay, where she remained as a stationary store ship for the rest of the war.

In February Lupo, with Lince (and joined later by destroyers Sella and Crispi) took part in the re-conquest of the island of Kastellorizo, which had been seized by British commandos.

In May Lupo was charged with escorting a convoy of 20 caiques and other small vessels transporting some 2,300 German troops to Crete, as reinforcements to the German paratroop assault on the island. On the night of 22/23 May the convoy was intercepted by a British force of three cruisers (HMS Dido, Orion, and Ajax) and four destroyers. To cover the escape of the convoy Lupo attacked the British vessels, firing her torpedoes and laying smoke. She came under heavy fire, and was hit by 18 large calibre shells, though only three exploded. Lupo passed through the British force, avoiding collision with a cruiser, and escaped, leaving the British force in some confusion (Orion reported damage from friendly fire as the cruisers tried to hit Lupo). The British force went on to chase down and sink eight of the caiques, but were left short of ammunition from the night action and were forced to withdraw before dawn; Lupo was able to return to the scene and rescue many of the survivors. Six caiques managed to slip away. One caique and a cutter, both of them detached from the convoy, eventually reached Crete. Three German officers and 110 troops landed in Cape Spatha, while the soldiers aboard the cutter were stopped by a British Army patrol after landing near Akotiri.

For this action Mimbelli was awarded the Gold Medal of Military Valour, while Lupo had the Silver Medal placed on her ensign. After this action Lupo gained the reputation as "the luckiest ship in the Italian Navy".

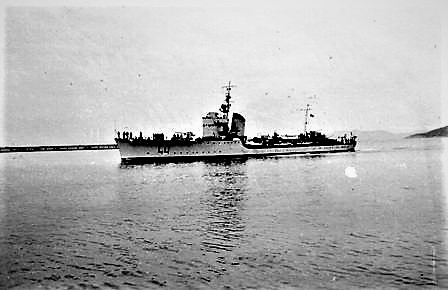
Lupo in 1941

After repair and refit Lupo returned to escort duty in the Aegean: In October while escorting a convoy from Crete she attempted to save sister ship Altair, which had been mined. The crew were saved, but Altair sank during the night under tow.

In November, in company with Cassiopeia, Lupo escorted two German merchants from Athens to Benghazi (the Maritza convoy) This came under attack by the British Force K, two cruisers and two destroyers. Lupo again attacked this superior force, while Cassiopeia led the merchants to safety. However, despite their efforts both merchant ships were sunk, and Lupo damaged.

In March 1942 Mimbelli left Lupo for a command in the Black Sea, while Lupo joined the escort force on the central convoy route to Libya.

In September 1942, Lupo, with three sister ships escorted three merchants to Tobruk; after coming under air attack the convoy scattered. Lupo and Castore, with one ship, arrived safely; the other two merchants and an escort were sunk.

That same month Lupo, with Sirio, escorted three ships from Crete to Tobruk. They came under submarine attack, but escaped without loss.

In November Lupo was escorting three merchants (the Veloce convoy) when she was sunk in action.

== Fate ==
On 30 November 1942 Lupo, in company with three sister ships under command of Corvette Captain Giuseppe Folli, left Naples to escort the merchant ships Veloce and Chisone to Tripoli. A third ship, the tanker Devoli, detached herself from the convoy to Trapani. On 2 December the convoy was attacked by aircraft from Malta; Veloce was hit twice and set on fire. While the other ships continued, Lupo stood by the sinking Veloce to render assistance to the survivors. The two vessels were eventually found south of the Kerkennah bank by a force of four destroyers which were tracing the convoy, led by HMS Jervis. Lupo was quickly overwhelmed by gunfire from the destroyers; Lupo sank in a few minutes, and the blazing wreck of Veloce followed shortly after. Aretusa, aware of the destroyers' attack, shepherded Chisone to Tripoli, while Ardente headed to the wreck site at dawn. She rescued 29 men from a crew of 164 officers and ratings. Captain Folli was lost with his ship.
