= MTSM motor torpedo boat =

1941 class of Italian motor torpedo boats

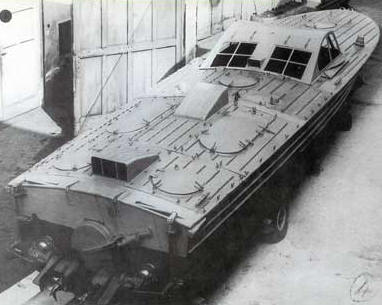
- MTSM on a trailer

Class overview
- Name: MTSM
- Operators: Regia Marina; National Republican Navy
- Preceded by: MTS
- Built: 1941-1943
- Completed: 100

General characteristics
- Displacement: 3 tons
- Length: 28 ft (8.5 m)
- Beam: 7.3 ft 10 in (2.48 m)
- Draught: 2 ft (0.61 m)
- Propulsion: 2 x Alfa Romeo outboard motors for a total of 190 hp (140 kW)
- Speed: 34 knots at full load
- Complement: 2
- Armament: 1 × 450 mm (18 in) torpedo; 2 × depth charges

The MTSM motor torpedo boat (Motoscafo da Turismo Silurante Modificato) was a series of small motor torpedo boats developed by the Regia Marina (Italian Royal Navy) during World War II.

The vessel was an improved version of the Motoscafo da Turismo Silurante (MTS) motor torpedo boat. This was achieved through a larger sea-going hull with reinforced keel and a sharper stem. The MTSM was designed to be towed by larger motorboats into the target area. Once there, the MTSM could carry out a torpedo attack on moored or stationary ships. The boat could also be transported over land on trailers.

== Early development ==
The Italian plans for an assault motor torpedo boat, the MTS, began in December 1939. The Italian Naval Command goal was a small, high speed two-seat motor torpedo boat based on the Motoscafo da Turismo Modificato (MTM), itself an improved version of the MT motorboat which used an explosive charge as the warhead. In addition to speed, seaworthiness and range should have made the motorboat capable of carrying out operations against anchored targets. The MTS was armed with two 450 mm torpedoes.

In the summer of 1940 Baglietto shipyards released the first four prototypes, MTS 1, MTS 2, MTS 3 and MTS 4. The motorboats were tested in an unsuccessful attack on Greek naval forces at Porto Edda, Albania, on 5 April 1941. After that it was clear that the MTS had indeed met the criteria, but due to its small wooden hull it was only partially seaworthy. The demand for a better and larger successor led to the development of the MTSM.

== Specifications and deployment ==
With a displacement of three tons, the MTSM had a length of 8.4 m (27 ft 7 in), a beam of 2.2 m (7 ft 3 in) and a draft of 0.6 m (24 in). They were propelled by two 95 hp (71 kW) Alfa Romeo AR 6c outboard motors and developed a maximum speed of 34 kn (63 km/h; 39 mph) at full load. The boats were fitted with radio equipment. Each MTSM was armed with a single 450 mm (18 in) torpedo amidships, behind the crew cockpit, and carried two 50 kg (110 lb) depth charges. The boat underwent its first test trials in autumn 1941, surpassing expectations for speed, maneuverability and steadiness. More than 100 units were delivered by Baglietto between 1941 and 1943.

== Operational history ==
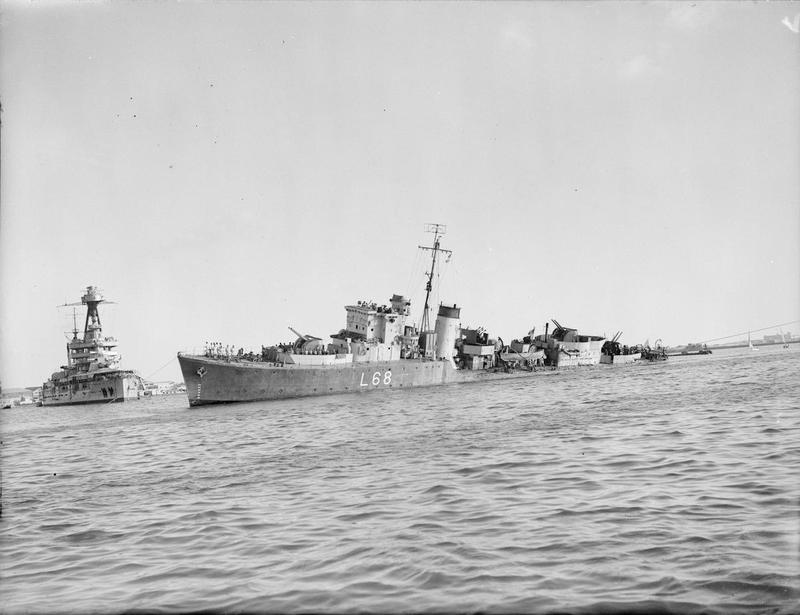
HMS Eridge, listing severely, towed into Alexandria harbour 29 August 1942

The main combat operational use of the MTSM was against the Allied supply line between El Alamein and Alexandria. These boats belonged to a sub-unit of the Decima MAS, the motorized column "Giobbe", which moved the boats along the coast by trailers. Little was achieved due to Allied air superiority, but the nighttime shelling by British destroyers gave an opportunity for the MTSMs. On 29 August 1942, while a flotilla of destroyers was bombarding Axis positions at El Daba, Egypt, MTSM-228, manned by Sub-Lieutenant Pietro Carminatti, and crewman Cesare Sani torpedoed and disabled the destroyer HMS Eridge. Eridge was towed to Alexandria by HMS Aldenham, where she was declared a constructive total loss, was used as a base ship for the rest of the war and scrapped in 1946. MTSM-228, which fired her single torpedo from a range of 150 meters, was bombed by a British aircraft and had to be abandoned by her crew. The next morning, the small craft was still adrift and the Italians attempted to take her to the coast, but a German Junkers Ju 87 "Stuka" strafed the boat by mistake and blew her to pieces.

At German request, another motorized column, the "Moccagatta", was deployed to Crimea in support of Operation Barbarossa from May 1942 to March 1943. The unit comprised five MTMs and five MTSMs. Italian reports claim that in the night of 6 June 1942 a 4,000 ton Soviet freighter was torpedoed and crippled by an MTSM and later destroyed by German aircraft. On 6 July a small craft carrying 13 Soviet servicemen was captured by another MTSM off Foros.

The MTSMs were widely used in the Mediterranean theatre by September 1943, when Italy signed an armistice with the Allies. Ten units joined the Italian Co-belligerent Navy, while an unknown number was active with the navy of the Italian Social Republic, a fascist statelet in northern Italy which remained part of the Axis. Most operations of the latter units took place in the Adriatic Sea, sometimes with mixed Italian and German crews. During the last months of the war they also were active in the Tyrrhenian and Ligurian sees. On 16 April 1945, a flotilla of MTM explosive boats, led by an MTSM, attacked the French destroyer Trombe off Sanremo. The warship was rammed and heavily damaged by one of the MTMs, and was eventually declared a constructive total loss.

== See also ==
- MAS (ship)
- Human torpedo
