= Karlgeorg Schuster =

Karl Georg "Karlgeorg" Wilhelm Otto Schuster (* 19 August 1886 in Uelzen, Province of Hanover, Kingdom of Prussia, German Empire; † 16 June 1973 in Kitzeberg near Kiel, West Germany) was a German naval officer of the Kaiserliche Marine, the Reichsmarine, and the Kriegsmarine, finally Admiral during World War II.

== Life ==
Schuster joined the Imperial Navy as an officer candidate on 1 April 1905 and completed his basic training on the cruiser frigate SMS Stein. He then attended the Naval School in Mürwik.

As a U-Boot ace of the seas and first commandant of SM U 60 (1 November 1916 to 31 October 1917) in WWI, Lieutenant Captain Schuster sank 35 ships with a total of 75,721 GRT and damaged another ship with 283 GRT during his enemy patrols (Feindfahrten).

On 1 May 1935 he was promoted to Rear Admiral and shortly thereafter, from 28 June to 24 September 1935, he was appointed II Admiral of the North Sea (II A d N). At the commissioning of the Kriegsmarine's "U 35" on 3 November 1936, the former watch officer of "SM U 35" Schuster, as well as other living crew members who served under Waldemar Kophamel and Lothar von Arnauld de la Perière, among others, were invited as guests of honor.

He then served as II Admiral of the Baltic Sea (II A d O) until 31 March 1938, and from there as 2nd Admiral of the Baltic Station from January 1938. At the same time he was entrusted with the duties of Commander for the Security of the Baltic Sea from 1 October 1937 to 31 March 1938. On 1 April 1938 he was promoted to Vice Admiral and simultaneously appointed Commander for the Security of the Baltic Sea. At the same time Schuster represented the Chief of the Test Command for New Warships from 3 to 19 June and the Commander of the Fortifications of the Western Baltic Sea from 20 July to 3 August 1938. Schuster served as Inspector of Naval Education from 28 October 1938, through the outbreak of World War II, until 1 November 1939.

He then joined the High Command of the Wehrmacht and became Chief of the Commercial and Economic Warfare Staff. As an admiral (since 1 January 1940), he was appointed Commanding Admiral West on 27 May 1940. Schuster continued to hold this post even after it was renamed Commanding Admiral France until 1 March 1941. From 4 March to 3 April 1941, Schuster served as commander of the provisional Admiral Z post, which later became Admiral Southeast. On 30 June 1941, another reorganization took place, and Schuster became Commander-in-Chief of Naval Group Command South. After receiving the German Cross in Gold on 19 February 1943, he was placed at the disposal of the Commander-in-Chief of the Kriegsmarine on 21 March and discharged on 30 June 1943 due to age and health.

Schuster continued to serve as an officer at disposal (zur Verfügung) and served as head of the War Science Department in the High Command of the Kriegsmarine from 1 July 1943, until the Wehrmacht's surrender on 8 May 1945. He was then taken prisoner of war by the US, from which he was released on 23 May 1947.

== Family ==
Carl/Karl was born as the son of Georg Rudolf Gottfried Hermann Schuster (d. 26 January 1909 in Uelzen), a physician and Privy Medical Councillor (Geheimer Sanitätsrat) from Celle and his wife Auguste Emilie Anna Steinmetz from Hanover. His oldest brother was Prof. Lic. theol. Dr. theol. h. c. Karl Georg Rudolf Hermann Schuster (1874–1965), theologian, educator and politician (DVP).

=== Marriage ===
On 30 May 1921 in Elberfeld, Kapitänleutnant Schuster married his fiancée Charlotte „Lotte“ Meyer-Leverkus (b. 17 November 1894), daughter of Ernst Meyer-Leverkus (1863–1942), Entrepreneur and business executive, as well as owner and general director of Rheinische Textilfabriken A.-G. in Elberfeld, a mechanical weaving mill dedicated to the production of clothing and lining fabrics. He also served as president of the Chamber of Commerce for the Wuppertal industrial district. They had five sons who all would receive pure Germanic given names:

- Sonnar (b. 14 June 1922 in Kiel)
- Thorleif (b. 25 September 1923 in Kiel), forester (Forstamt Ludwigsstadt/Forstdirektion Oberfranken)
- Frohdhin (b. 28 July 1926), head of Latin America sector of the BASF Group, later, living in Heidelberg, limited partner (Kommanditist) of the Boden-Wert Grundstücksvermietungsgesellschaft & Co.
- Freyr-Widur (b. 1 December 1928 in Kiel; d. 28 May 2024 in Wedel)
- Tyrwig (b. 26 September 1931)

According to the military personnel file (BArch PERS 6/2475), there was also a daughter (b. 1924/25; d. 23 March 1942).

== Promotions ==
- 1 April 1905 Seekadett (Officer Candidate)
- 7 April 1906 Fähnrich zur See (Officer Cadet)
- 28 September 1908 Leutnant zur See (2nd Lieutenant)
- 29 August 1910 Oberleutnant zur See (1st Lieutenant)
- 16 November 1915 Kapitänleutnant (Lieutenant Captain)
- 30 April 1924 Korvettenkapitän (Corvette Captain / Lieutenant Commander) with effect from 1 May 1924
- 1 August 1929 Fregattenkapitän (Frigate Captain / Commander)
- 1 October 1931 Kapitän zur See (Captain at Sea / Captain / Colonel)
- 1 May 1935: Konteradmiral (Rear Admiral)
- 1 April 1938 Vizeadmiral (Vice Admiral)
- 1 January 1940 Admiral
  - 1 July 1943 Admiral at Disposal / zur Verfügung (z. V.)

== Awards and decorations ==
- Iron Cross (1914), 2nd and 1st Class
  - 2nd Class on 7 April 1915
  - 1st Class on 5 April 1917
- Ottoman Order of Osmanieh, 4th Class with Swords/Sabers (TO4X) in July 1916
- Lübeck Hanseatic Cross (Lübeckisches Hanseatenkreuz; LübH/LüH) in October 1916
- House Order of Hohenzollern, Knight's Cross with Swords (HOH3X) on 1 December 1917
- U-boat War Badge 1918
- Honour Cross of the World War 1914/1918 with Swords on 21 December 1934
- Wehrmacht Long Service Award, 4th to 1st Class on 2 October 1936
- Hungarian Order of Merit, 1st Class / Knight Grand Cross on 20 August 1938
- Sudetenland Medal on 20 December 1939
- Medal to Commemorate the Homecoming of the Memelland
- Honorary Dagger of the Kriegsmarine in 1940
- Repetition Clasp 1939 to the Iron Cross 1914, 2nd and 1st Class
  - 2nd Class on 31 July 1940
  - 1st Class on 6 June 1941
- Order of Military Merit (Bulgaria), Grand Cross with the War Decoration
- Order of the Crown of King Zvonimir, Grand Cross with Swords on 26 September 1942
- Order of the Star of Romania, I. Class with Swords on the valor ribbon of military virtue on 6 October 1942
- Order of the Roman Eagle, 1st Class / Knight Grand Cross with Swords on 4 February 1943
- German Cross in Gold on 19 February 1943 as Admiral and Commander-in-Chief of the Naval Group Command South
- Order of Michael the Brave, III. Class on 4 March 1943
  - another source states, awarded on 15 January 1943, permission to accept on 4 March 1943
- Romanian Commemorative Medal for the Crusade Against Communism on 4/5 March 1943
