= Durand de la Penne-class destroyer =

Ship class

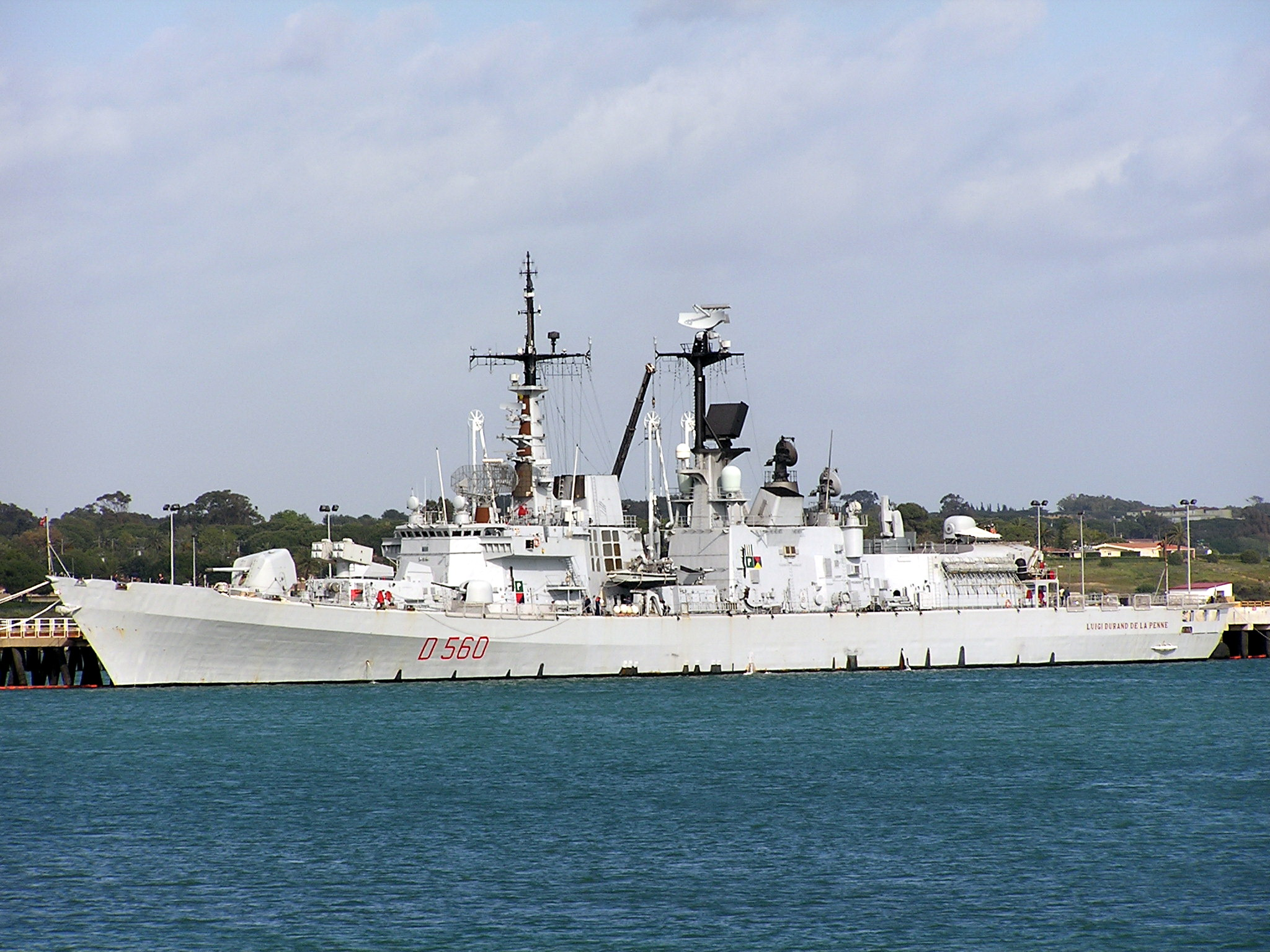
- Durand de la Penne

Class overview
- Name: Durand de la Penne class
- Builders: Fincantieri, Riva Trigoso (La Spezia)
- Operators: Italian Navy
- Preceded by: Audace class (1971)
- Succeeded by: Andrea Doria class
- Cost: Lire 1498 billion (equivalent to €1.28 billion in 2019) for two ships (1981-1993); Lire 749 billion (equivalent to €640 million in 2019) per unit
- Built: 1989–1992
- In commission: 1992–2026
- Planned: 4
- Completed: 2
- Cancelled: 2
- Active: 0
- Retired: 2

General characteristics
- Type: Guided-missile destroyer
- Displacement: - 4,500 t (4,400 long tons), standard; - 5.560 t (5.472 long tons), full load
- Length: 147.7 m (485 ft)
- Beam: 16.1 m (53 ft)
- Draught: 5 m (16 ft)
- Propulsion: - CODOG scheme: - 2 × General Electric/Avio LM2500 gas turbines providing 41,000 kW (55,000 hp); - 2 × diesel engines Grandi Motori Trieste BL-230-20-DVM 9,396 kW (12,600 hp); - 6 x diesel engine generators Fincantieri DMD 203-6
- Speed: 32 knots (59 km/h; 37 mph)
- Range: 7,000 nmi (13,000 km; 8,100 mi) at 18 knots (33 km/h; 21 mph)
- Complement: 380
- Sensors & processing systems: - 1 × SPS-52C 3D radar; - 1 × AESN MM/SPS-768 radar; - 1 × medium range AESN MM/SPS-774; - 1 × surface radar AMS MM/SPS-702; - 1 × navigation radar SMA MM/SPN-703; - 4 × AESN Orion RTN-30X (MM/SPG-76); - 1 × sonar system DE-1164/1167; - 1 × TACAN URN-25; - 1 × SADOC-2 combat system
- Electronic warfare & decoys: - ECM system Elettronica SLQ-732 NETTUNO; - 2 x SAGEM Sagaie decoy launching system; - ASW AN/SLQ-25 Nixie, Surface Ship Torpedo Defense (SSTD) System
- Armament: - 1 × Otobreda 127 mm gun; - 3 × Oto Melara 76/62 mm Super Rapido gun; - 1 × Albatross octuple launcher for Selenia Aspide SAM; - 1 × Mk 13 launcher with 40 Standard SM-1MR missiles; - 4 × OTOMAT Mk2 SSMs; - 4 × Milas anti submarine missile; - 2 × 324 mm triple torpedo launchers WASS B515/3
- Aircraft carried: 2 helicopters
- Aviation facilities: double hangar

The Durand de la Penne class are two guided-missile destroyers operated by the Italian Navy. The design is an enlarged version of the Audace class, updated with diesel and gas turbine CODOG machinery and modern sensors. Four ships were planned but the second pair were cancelled when Italy joined the Horizon project.

== Origins ==
This class is named after a famous naval diver who served in Italy's Royal Navy during World War II, Luigi Durand de la Penne. He, together with other members of X MAS made the most successful human torpedo mission, damaging the British battleships Queen Elizabeth and Valiant in Alexandria, December 1941, with SLCs 'Maiale'.

These new ships were meant as very advanced destroyers, with an improvement over the previous types in almost every aspect of design. Because the ships in the Italian Navy are seldom built from scratch (especially for economic reasons), it is worth considering the evolution of this project, starting with the first class of missile destroyers made in Italy. With progressive calls for better performances, this class evolved into the final design for the Durand de la Penne class destroyer.

The first step of this 'cumulative growth' was the Impavido class, the first guided-missile destroyers of the navy, but still a version of the Impetuoso class. The Impavido class ships were commissioned in the early 1960s and were roughly equal to the US Navy Charles F. Adams-class destroyers. Both shared the Tartar missile system, with a Mk 13 launcher, around 40 missiles and two Fire Control radars, all this was fitted in the aft of the ship. Both also had two 127 mm (5 in) guns, but American ships had these in single mountings and in a new model, the Mk 42, one fore and the other aft, while the Impavido made use of an older Mk 38 dual turret.

One difference was the secondary weaponry. While both had lightweight torpedo launchers, the rest was different. The Charles F. Adams class had an ASROC launcher, dedicated to ASW tasks, to help counter the growing number of Soviet submarines. The Impavidos did not have such systems, but instead had four model MM (Marina Militare) 76 mm (3 in) guns. In the Mediterranean there was always the danger of air attacks as the main threat to ships, and this usually led to the construction of many Italian warships with a heavier short-range air defence armament than normal. This is not true for oceanic ships, less endangered by aircraft and more by submarines. The relative danger to the Royal Navy in the Falklands War was due, mainly, to the excessive optimisation to fight Soviet submarines, so after this war the RN made many improvements in the air defence field – including installation of many Close-In Weapon Systems.

In service the MM guns were not considered satisfactory, despite having decisive improvements over the older American 76 mm (3 in) guns. Reliability left a lot to be desired, while the lack of a totally automatic mode of fire proved a disadvantage. Not coincidentally, no first generation 76 mm (3 in) Italian guns had any export success.

In the early years of the 1970s, a new pair of destroyers was commissioned, the Audace class. They were built somewhat bigger, to accommodate the solution to one of the most serious weakness of the previous Impavido class, the lack of an ASW helicopter hangar. Agusta had navalised the Bell 212 helicopter and two of these were accommodated in a hangar, practically framed with the Tartar launcher, in the same relatively small superstructure.

The guns remained in the same location, number, and calibre, but they were totally new models, developed in those years: the Otobreda 76 mm (3 in) Compact and Otobreda 127/54 Compact. The latter was and is still a very powerful weapon, with a rate of fire of 40–45 shells per minute, and projected to be an efficient anti-aircraft weapon. They have a greater maximum elevation and higher rate of fire than their rough equivalent, the US 5"/54 caliber Mark 45 gun, but also have higher weight and volume requirements. Two were in fore positions, at different heights to shoot at the same target. They were controlled by the new RTN-10X radar, an advanced type for its time that was also adopted by the Royal Navy for some of its ships.

Midship there were four Otobreda 76 mm cannons. They were and are reliable, fast-firing and light weapons, capable of sustaining a rate of fire of 80 rounds a minute and actually the most widespread weapon of its class (also because there are practically no competitors). These guns also had fire control radars, one for every flank. Towards the aft of the ship there was the Tartar launcher with the two Agusta helicopters able to make ASW and limited anti-ship tasks. For ASW these ships also have both light (two triple 12.8 inch) and heavy (two dual 533 mm) torpedo launchers, and Whitehead A.244 (light) and A.192 (heavy) torpedoes, 12 for each type. These were very modern and advanced in their day and the heavier type were able to be also used against ships within their 20 km (12 mi) range. So the Audace class had two different types of guns and two different types of torpedoes, a characteristic without parallel in other navies.

The class was not perfect however. Despite the powerful six-gun armament, none of them was able to fire directly aft of the ship, leaving this quarter only to the Tartar missile system, a weapon not meant to provide close air defence (this will be rectified with the de la Penne class). The artillery was also very good when employed against aircraft, but somewhat lacking against missiles (despite the very short time required to fire after the alarm was given), while there were no SSM missiles on board, to strike naval target over the horizon (except the use of the obsolete AS-12 missile from helicopters), so this role could only be accomplished by guns within the 20-25 km (16 mi) range of the gun systems.

The powerplant was still a steam-turbine type, quite bulky and obsolete, but their 73,000 shp (54,000 kW) were enough to achieve around 33 knots (61 km/h) and quite a good range. The ship's dimensions were again a bit cramped, accommodating all the equipment and the crew (380) on board a relatively small hull. The heavy load of ammunitions was a serious potential danger for the ship. Also because the superstructure was built of light aluminium alloys, prone to burn in a substantial fire.

At the end of the 1980s, while the Impavidos were phased out, the Audaces were modernised. The second 127 mm (5 in) gun (in 'B' position) was replaced by an 8-round Albatross/Aspide system. Eight long range Otomat missiles were fitted at midship, between the four 76 mm (3 in) guns, now replaced with the Super-Rapid sub-type, which were much better against missiles. The heavy torpedoes were removed and overall the capabilities were improved in AAW and anti-ship tasks.

The Audaces were one of the best destroyer classes of its time. There were some shortcomings to face however, and technical evolution to consider, while the Impavidos were too old to be considered good for other updates. So in the 1980s development of a new class of destroyer was begun. Initially known as the Audace 'migliorata' class, or class Animoso, they were given the final name of Durand de la Penne Class.

Initially there were projects for three 40 mm (2 in) DARDO CIWS, but these were then replaced by Super-Rapid 76 mm (3 in) guns which were considered superior. This and the partial redesign of the ship to gain a reduced RCS were the main alterations during the engineering.

The power-plant was planned with new generation machinery: a CODAG configuration, diesel for cruising, and gas-turbines for high speed. This provided more endurance, less weight, with less space needed, less danger (no boilers) and were more responsive than steam turbines. Superstructure components were made mainly of steel and not flammable aluminium. Some armour was added as well in the vital sectors. All this caused an increase in displacement, from the original 3,600/4,500 tons of Audace, to 4,500/5,400 tons. Overall dimension were also increased.

== General project ==
The Durand de Le Penne class are escort and combat class ships, able to operate in every combat condition, and especially devised to survive to heavy missile and aircraft attacks. Its construction is made almost totally with steel; the structure is a continuous deck with a low, large stern, to accommodate the helicopter force. The fore hull is very pointed, with a very pronounced sea-cutter structure. The superstructure consists of two blocks, relatively low and wide, both with a high, antenna mast with a triangular cross-section for all the electronic. The engines exhausts are in two groups, one for each superstructure: the aft has two exhausts flank to flank, slightly inclined. Then there is the Standard missile system and finally the helicopter facilities.

The ship itself is built to be much more difficult to sink by enemy action than the previous types, with many bulkheads and anti-fire systems. Many of the main communication lines and computers are duplicated, and there is an NBC system for the crew. Stealthness is partially applied, with reduction of RCS, heat, noise and magnetic signatures.

The speed, given by a CODAG system, is high (31 knots) but not so high like the previous Audaces, also because the modern ships seldom has need of speeds over 25 knots (46 km/h). The endurance, automation and economy are more important, as well as the compact design of this power-plant. The powerplant is based on two General Electric LM-2500 gas turbines, one of the most successful naval turbines, and 2 diesels. One of each are linked with one shaft fitted with a propeller with 5 blades. The entire propulsion system is controlled remotely; no crew is needed inside the powerplant section in normal situations.

As for vulnerability and general characteristics, these ships, while prestigious, were a bit smaller than was actually needed. In fact, the weapon (and explosives) concentration is very high. In the foredeck, in less than 20 m there are 3 medium caliber guns, with over 200 shells just behind the deck ready for use, surrounding the Aspide system, that has 16 or 24 × 230 kg missiles just below the deck. The aft superstructure is equally heavily armed, with a gun, 2 helicopters and 40 SM-1/2 missiles (the combined weight of the latter 24 tonnes, with over 1 T high-explosive), plus the ASW torpedo stores (several Mk 46 or A244 torpedoes), in less than 25 m. Also because of this, the crew complement, at 380, is larger than as in other modern ships: a large crew is absolutely required to control damage or fire.

Although the class is criticized for the small displacement related to their equipment, the previous Audace class were even more cramped: they were 900t lighter, quite smaller, with a bulky powerplant; however, in their latest update they had the same armament, plus an extra Super-Rapido gun (4 instead of 3).

Another criticism aimed at these ships is the lack of vertical launchers, not purchased by Italian Navy because of financial constraints, choosing instead to modernize the Impavido's launchers. Therefore, the Durand de la Penne class are the last and maybe the most powerful of the "conventional missile destroyers". This came at a cost, however: 1500mld. Lire for both these ships (1981–1993 program), partially because a large production run could not be afforded by the navy or such big ships (so no economies of scale were obtained).

== Weaponry ==
These ships have an overall shape that appears as large, low, and aggressive. A direct consequence of their armament and the special features of sloped surfaces (because of stealth principles).

Weapon systems include gun batteries scattered over all the ship, which helps to make its profile well recognisable. As anti-aircraft equipment, there are 6 weapons, of four different types: Standard SM-1 launcher Mk13, Albatross-Aspide, 1 gun Compact 127/54 mm, 3 guns Super-Rapid of 76 mm caliber. All these weapons cover all the horizon, giving an air defence able to stop quite heavy attacks, especially from the front, because the majority of these are placed on the foredeck.

If the Standard missiles, with their 2 SPG radar are dedicated to air defence at longer ranges, the rest is medium-short range weaponry. Having Aspide/Sea Sparrow launchers, these ships are one of the few that possess both these systems (Standard and Sparrow class missiles). Aspide are very advanced missiles (with monopulse guide from the start of service, 1977), but they are almost identical to Sea Sparrow. In fact, these latter were mass-produced by Alenia before the start of the Aspide, so this experience was a clear advantage to when it came to build new missiles. However, all the systems warhead, guide, engine) were new and much improved over the old Sparrow-E, and roughly equal to Sparrow-M, which were not available in 1977. 16 missiles are in the magazines, but a Riva-Calzoni system can quickly load 4 at once in the 8 cell launcher, so these missiles are quickly reloadable (the Sparrow launchers have manual reloading).

The Compatto 127 mm gun was removed from the Audace DDGs when Aspide was fitted. It was modernised before its re-utilisation on the Durand de la Penne class.

The OTO Super Rapid are powerful weapons for their calibre, and despite CIWS defence normally delegated to smaller calibres, they have mainly this task. They can shoot 120 RPM, 6.3 kg (14 lb) shells with sophisticated fuses, and engage at 6 km (4 mi) even anti-ship missiles. It is claimed by OTO that these guns can engage 4 missiles before they reach the ship. In every case, they have beaten the contenders like Dardo 40 mm guns and the new Myriad, 25 mm gatling CIWS (that have not seen any commercial success), despite its 10000 rpm capability. Four RTN-30 radar-optical system control such weapons, 2 fore and 2 aft, so not all the weapons can shoot simultaneously at different targets.

As for anti-ship weapons, the ship carries Otomat, missiles with very long range (180 km or more), with mid-course guidance by AB-212s, sea skimmer capability and a 210 kg (463 lb) warhead. 8 missiles are placed mid-ship, between the two main superstructures.

The aft superstructure has a very concentrated set of weapons (just like the foredeck). In the hangar superstructure there are 2 AB-212ASW, 1 Super-Rapid gun, and the 40 missiles of the Mk 13 launcher, utilising SM-1MR missiles, an eventual big improvement over the original in almost every respect. Standard missiles are capable of attacking naval vessels.

The electronic systems are a complete suite with dedicated systems for all the tasks and 11 different radar systems. These are:

- SPS-40 tri-dimensional radar over one of the 2 triangular trees, the aft one (US built, 300 km (186 mi) range, S band)
- the other main radar is an SPS-768 bi-dimensional (Alenia built, roughly the same range, D band), that is placed over the turrion, then, there is a radar dedicated to look for low-flying aircraft and ships, 160 km (99 mi) range (S), in the forward tree. Perhaps this unusual accommodation was due to the excessive weight up high, if the two main radars were both placed on the trees. It is linked with Dardo FCS. The forward tree has a quantity of small electronic antennas for communications, datalinks and ECMs.
- There is also a surface radar SPS-702, X band, the latest version of a type which has been quite successful and with all solid-state electronics. Finally there is a navigation radar, with X band, in the forward tree.
- 6 FCS radars are present, with two Standard missile radars AN/SPG-51 D (G/I band) with a FCS Mk 74 Mod.6. 4 DARDO-E are used for artillery and Aspide use, K-band (plus TV, IL, laser and IR sensors)
- a DE 1164/1167 sonar with (differently by Audaces) an immersion (VDS) DE 1167 element
- an ECM set Nettuno, one ESM, 2 rocket launchers DAGAIE (of French construction, replacing the previous SCLAR systems of Breda, 10 tubes with 330 mm (13 in) caliber and 10 km (6 mi) range, IR-radar decoys)
- a complete set for communication and control, including the combat system called IPN-20 by the manufacturer Alenia, and SADOC-2 by the Italian Navy. It's a computerised elaboration system, that take care of all the tactical information and communications with other platforms. It has 10 consoles with one operator each (Giuseppe Garibaldi carrier had a SADOC with only one console more than the Durand de la Pennes).

== Ships ==
Italian Navy - Durand de la Penne class
Name	Pennant number	Hull number	Laid down	Launched	Commissioned	Decommissioned	Motto
Luigi Durand de la Penne (ex-Animoso)	D 560	5844	20 January 1988	20 October 1989	18 March 1993	1 October 2024	Utique vince
Francesco Mimbelli (ex-Ardimentoso)	D 561	5845	15 November 1989	13 April 1991	18 October 1993	29 October 2026	Audendum est

== Service ==
Durand de la Penne was in service with the Italian Navy starting from 1993, followed one year later by Mimbelli. These two ships, together with the two old Audaces, were the bulk of Italian navy's air defence, especially before the AV-8 Harrier, armed with AMRAAM missiles, became fully operational. But even so, these were available only in the Giuseppe Garibaldi task force. These missile destroyers have performed well as command ships in several deployment even over Mediterranean sea, and the last of their missions was related to the Italian peacekeeping force in Lebanon.

The Durand de la Penne class have an important role in Italian navy. Now that the Audaces are decommissioned, the Durand de la Pennes will remain the only missile destroyers (and the only ship with area defence-missiles) for some time, until the new Horizon class become operative. Like almost all Italian ships, they were designed with a modern and effective armament, but retained the same for their entire operative lives.

Minor changes are or will be made: the compatibility with one EH101 heavy helicopter or 2 NH90 (enhancing the helicopters capabilities, now still on AB-212s) equipped with new sensors, ASW torpedoes MU-90 and the Marte Mk 2 anti-ship missile, over the new ASW missiles MILAS, and quite obviously, continuous updates on the computers and electronic systems, that brings much improved performances even if externally there is almost no difference to notice.

Another important improvement will be the adoption of guided ammunition for the guns: Vulcano projectile for 127 mm (5 in), with an extended range of 70–100 km, meant as coastal bombing, is a quantum leap forward compared to the traditional artillery rounds (similar to a new models developed in USA), while DAVIDE (guided) or DART (sabot projectile) will further enhance the already very powerful anti-missile defence of these ships. There are no plans, currently, to equip them with EMPAR/ASTER missile systems.

== See also ==
- List of destroyer classes

Equivalent destroyers of the same era

- Type 052
- Kongō class
- Arleigh Burke class
