= Costantino Costantini =

Costantino Costantini may refer to:

- Costantino Costantini (architect)
- Costantino Costantini (politician)
