= Andrea Rapicio =

Italian bishop and jurist

- Bishop of Trieste
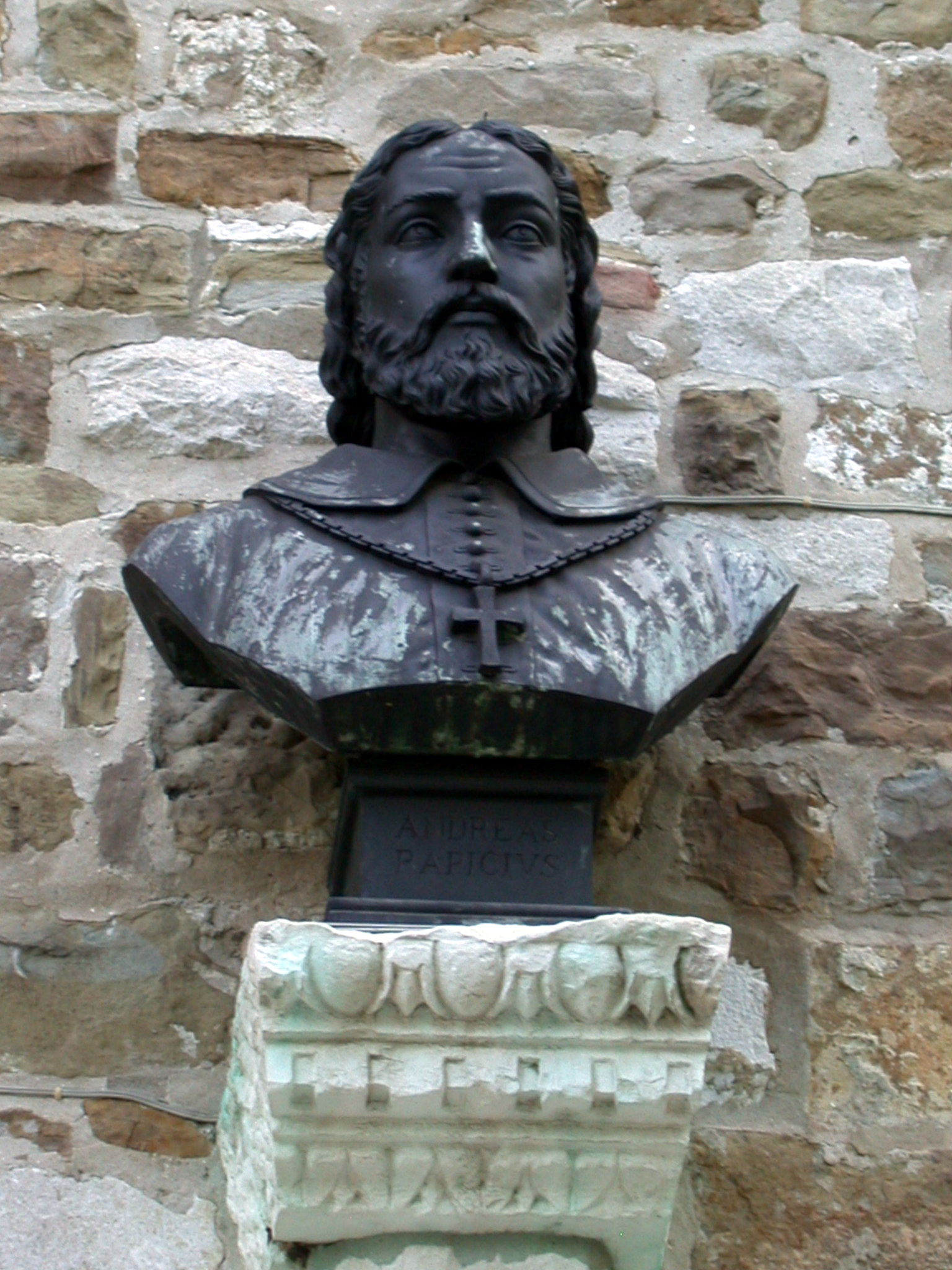
- Bust of Rapicio on the facade of the Trieste Cathedral
- Church: Catholic Church
- Diocese: Diocese of Trieste
- In office: 1567–1573
- Predecessor: Giovanni Betta
- Successor: Giacinto Frangipane

Personal details
- Born: 1533 Trieste
- Died: 31 December 1573 (aged 40) Trieste

Andrea Rapicio, also Rapiccio, Rapicius, Rapitius and Ravizza (2 December 1533 – 31 December 1573), was an Italian Catholic bishop and jurist, bishop of Trieste from 1567 until his death in 1573.

== Biography ==
=== Early life ===
Rapicio was born in Trieste, in the first days of December 1533. He was the second son of Domenico Ravizza who, according to the customs of the time, had latinized his surname into Rapicius. His father was Ferdinand I's minister and advisor to Archduke Charles. The Ravizza family belonged to the Triestine patriciate. They might've been of Istrian Italian origin, though the family ultimately originated from the Italian region of Lombardy. The family name Ravizza was still present in the early 19th century in Pisino, where the family owned an estate.

=== Career ===
He studied in Capodistria, with Ambrogio Febeo as his tutor. He continued his studies in Vienna, and in 1550, due to an epidemic, moved to Padua, where he graduated in 1554. Around this time, he wrote his Facilioris Musae carminum libri duo. In 1566 he was sent to the court of Vienna as orator and representative of the Triestine council, to ask for rights of navigation in the upper Adriatic sea. He made important friendships there, meanwhile reaching literary fame with his poem Histria.

He was named councilor of the Emperor in March 1563. In 1565 he was appointed as Bishop of Trieste by Archduke Charles of Styria. In 1566, as bishop elect, he issued a Constitutiones in 12 chapters. He was confirmed Bishop of Trieste by the Pope as late as 22 August 1567, and consecrated Bishop in October 1567.

=== Death ===
At the time, the Trieste nobility was politically divided into various factions, mainly divided in the pro-Venetian and the pro-Habsburg. Rapicio understood that the division was to the detriment of the citizens' interests, so he did his utmost to broker peace. When he believed he had reached an agreement, he wanted to celebrate the New Year by inviting the exponents of the parties to dinner. But evidently the agreement had not yet been reached. One of the factions, it is not known which one, wanted to poison the representative of the opposing party, but by mistake the chalice with the poison ended up in the hand of the bishop who drank its content and died. A recent hypothesis claims that it was not a mistake at all, but a premeditated elimination of the only person who could have organized the city nobility against Austrian hegemony. However, it seems more probable that the account of the death by poisoning, already testified at the end of the 17th century by Carnolino Johann Weichard von Valvasor and by the Trieste historian Ireneo della Croce, is without real foundation: in the Graz archive there is a letter written to Archduke Charles of Habsburg by the bishop's mother shortly after the latter's death. In it, the woman asks the sovereign to settle the pending money and makes no mention of how her son died. If he had fallen victim to a conspiracy, or in any case if he had died violently, her mother certainly would not have omitted this detail at the very moment in which she asked for his rights to be recognized.

Besides being a jurist, Rapicio was also a man of letters; two books of Latin poems (Facilioris Musae libri duo), the Latin geographical poem Histria and other minor poems, always in Latin, have come down to us. The Civic Library of Trieste holds his manuscript Epigrammaton liber secundus. He also wrote a funeral oration for the death of Charles V (printed) and a similar work for the death of Charles' brother and successor Ferdinand I (published by B. Zlobec in Quaderni Giuliani di Storia XXIV 2003, pp. 243– 285).

After a few decades, his family retired in Istria, which could confirm the hypothesis that the young Rapicio had spent long periods of vacation there with his family. The Rapicio castle, an imposing masonry that was destroyed during the Second World War, was located near Pisino. Only one painting has survived, probably originally part of a series, depicting Andrea Rapicio himself. The work of an unknown painter, it can be dated to the beginning of the 18th century.
