= Costantino Costantini (politician) =

Mayor of Pisino
- In office 1919–1922

Personal details
- Born: Pisino, Austrian Empire
- Died: Pisino, Austria-Hungary
- Party: Società politica istriana
- Parent: Francesco Costantini (father)
- Occupation: Politician, lawyer
- Profession: Lawyer

Costantino Costantini was an Istrian Italian lawyer and politician. He was Mayor of Pisino (now Pazin, Croatia) from 1919 until 1922. He was the son of former podestà (mayor) and politician Francesco Costantini. He has been credited as "one of the most illustrious figures of Istrian irredentism".

== Biography ==
Costantino Costantini was born in Pisino, Istria (now Pazin, Croatia, then part of the Austrian Empire) to lawyer and politician Francesco Costantini, the founder of the Società politica istriana, and Clotilde Mrach, from a Pisino family of landowners and politicians.

He was a lawyer. He became Director of the Council for Tax Administration of Pisino, and then was Head of the Council of Administration of the Comune of Pisino since 1894, later becoming vice-podestà. From 1900 until 1911 he was deputy of the Diet of Istria for the college of the cities of Pisino (Pazin) and Albona (Labin). After the Revolution, when Pisino became part of Italy, he was Special Commissioner of Pisino.

Costantini then became Mayor of Pisino, serving in this capacity from 1919 until 1922.
