= Lindar =

Lindar may refer to:

- Lindar (Tolkien), a term for the fictional race of the Elves
- Lindar, Croatia, a village near Pazin
