= Zabrežani =

Zabrežani Presani
- Village
- Location within Croatia
- Coordinates: 45.1798759°N 13.8907153°E
- Country: Croatia
- County: Istria County
- Municipality: Pazin

Area
  - Total: 4.1 sq mi (10.6 km^{2})

Population (2021)
  - Total: 454
  - Density: 111/sq mi (42.8/km^{2})
- Time zone: UTC+1 (CET)
  - Summer (DST): UTC+2 (CEST)
- Postal code: 52000 Pazin
- Area code: 052

Zabrežani (Italian: Presani) is a village in the municipality of Pazin, Istria in Croatia.

== Demographics ==
According to the 2021 census, its population was 454.
