= Bertoši =

Bertoši Bertozzi
- Village
- Location within Croatia
- Coordinates: 45.2095796°N 13.9000798°E
- Country: Croatia
- County: Istria County
- Municipality: Pazin

Area
  - Total: 3.0 sq mi (7.8 km^{2})

Population (2021)
  - Total: 392
  - Density: 130/sq mi (50/km^{2})
- Time zone: UTC+1 (CET)
  - Summer (DST): UTC+2 (CEST)
- Postal code: 52000 Pazin
- Area code: 052

Bertoši (Italian: Bertozzi) is a village in the municipality of Pazin, Istria in Croatia.

== Demographics ==
According to the 2021 census, its population was 392.
