= Pazin Decisions =

The Pazin Decisions (Croatian: Pazinske odluke) or September Decisions were the decisions of the National Liberation Committee for Istria adopted in Pazin on 13 September 1943, and of the Assembly of Istrian People's Representatives on 26 September 1943, on the unification of Istria with Croatia.

== Background ==
At the end of World War I, Austria-Hungary ceded Istria to the Italian Royal Army under the terms of the Armistice of Villa Giusti. At the Paris peace conference, Italy was among the winning powers, and obtained the suzerainty over Istria, according to the terms of the Treaty of Rapallo.

After Benito Mussolini's rise to power in 1922, Croats and Slovenes in Istria were exposed to a policy of forced Italianization and cultural suppression. The Italian government conducted a purge of Croats and Slovenes in the administration, judiciary, and education while closely monitoring all its potential opponents. In response to this, the organization TIGR, regarded as the first armed antifascist resistance group in Europe, was founded in 1927.

== Decision of 13 September ==
After the capitulation of Italy on 8 September 1943, which was announced in Istria late in the afternoon of the same day, some people began removing fascist symbols from public buildings. On the next day, an uprising began in Istria and over the next few days around 8,600 Italian soldiers were disarmed. An estimated 10,000 Istrians participated in the uprising, and by 11 September they captured almost the entire peninsula except for Pula and Rijeka. The insurgents from the area of Croatian Istria also captured Izola and Koper in the Slovenian part of Istria, and advanced to Trieste.

On 13 September the National Liberation Committee of Istria, published a political manifesto with a decision to "join the motherland and proclaim unification with the rest of our Croatian brothers". The proclamation entitled "Istrian people!" states that "Istria is Croatian land and will remain Croatian" and that Istria was liberated by its own strength and by the will of the people.

After the uprising in Istria, on 19 September 1943, the Croatian Central Head-Quarter named an Operational Head-Quarter for Istria. Savo Vukelić was appointed commander, and Joža Skočilić was appointed political commissary. The Operational HQ arrived in Pazin on 23 September 1943. On 20 September 1943, ZAVNOH confirmed the Decision of the National Liberation Committee for Istria by adopting the Decision to annex Istria, Rijeka, Zadar and other occupied areas to Croatia.

== Decision of 26 September ==
The Assembly of Istrian People's Representatives was held in Pazin on 25 and 26 September, at which a temporary Provincial National Liberation Committee for Istria was elected and the decision on secession from Italy and unification with Croatia was confirmed. Decisions were also made on the abolition of Italian fascist laws, on the change of forcibly Italianized surnames, names and toponyms, on the opening of Croatian schools, on the Croatian language in the church, on the recognition of national rights for the Italian minority in Istria, and on the return to Italy of Italians who had immigrated after 1918 in order to change the ethnic structure of Istria.

== Aftermath ==
At the end of September 1943, Germany began Operation Volkenbruch, bringing in significant forces from Italy. In seven days of heavy fighting, around 2,500 insurgents were killed, along with many civilians, and the rebellion was stopped.

In October, the unification of Istria was confirmed at the second session of ZAVNOH in Plaški by the adoption of the Decision on the annexation of Istria, Rijeka, Zadar and other occupied regions to Croatia. In November, the acts of ZAVNOH were approved by AVNOJ at its Second Session in Jajce.

== Legacy ==
In September 2005, the Croatian Parliament established 25 September as the Day of the Decision on the unification of Istria, Rijeka, Zadar and the islands with the Croatian mother country commemorating the Pazin Decisions.
