= Ježenj =

Ježenj Ieseni di Antignana
- Village
- Location within Croatia
- Country: Croatia
- County: Istria County
- Municipality: Pazin

Area
  - Total: 1.2 sq mi (3.2 km^{2})

Population (2021)
  - Total: 147
  - Density: 120/sq mi (46/km^{2})
- Time zone: UTC+1 (CET)
  - Summer (DST): UTC+2 (CEST)
- Postal code: 52000 Pazin
- Area code: 052

Ježenj (Italian: Ieseni di Antignana) is a small village near the town of Pazin in Istria County, Croatia.

== Demographics ==
According to the 2021 census, its population was 147. The population was 141 in 2011.
