= Grdoselo =

Grdoselo Castelverde di Pisino, Gherdosella
- Village
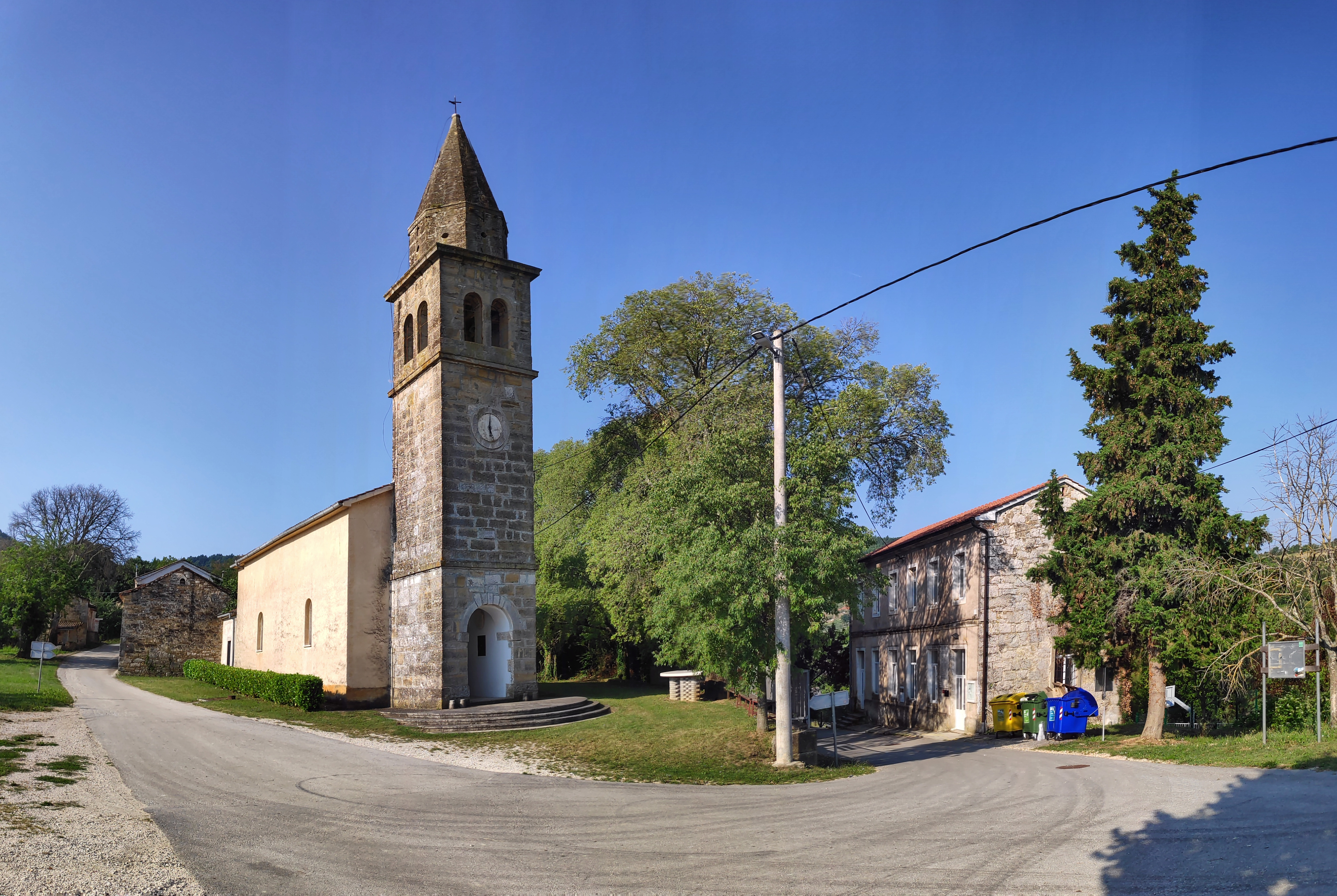

- Location within Croatia
- Coordinates: 45.3006591°N 13.8925543°E
- Country: Croatia
- County: Istria County
- Municipality: Pazin

Area
  - Total: 4.1 sq mi (10.7 km^{2})

Population (2021)
  - Total: 128
  - Density: 31.0/sq mi (12.0/km^{2})
- Time zone: UTC+1 (CET)
  - Summer (DST): UTC+2 (CEST)
- Postal code: 52000 Pazin
- Area code: 052

Grdoselo (Italian: Castelverde di Pisino or Gherdosella) is a village in the municipality of Pazin, Istria in Croatia.

== Demographics ==
According to the 2021 census, its population was 128.
