= Zamaski Dol =

Zamaski Dol Valle di Zumesco
- Village
- Location within Croatia
- Coordinates: 45.3238288°N 13.8743718°E
- Country: Croatia
- County: Istria County
- Municipality: Pazin

Area
  - Total: 1.3 sq mi (3.4 km^{2})

Population (2021)
  - Total: 42
  - Density: 32/sq mi (12/km^{2})
- Time zone: UTC+1 (CET)
  - Summer (DST): UTC+2 (CEST)
- Postal code: 52000 Pazin
- Area code: 052

Zamaski Dol (Italian: Valle di Zumesco) is a village in the municipality of Pazin, Istria in Croatia.

== Demographics ==
According to the 2021 census, its population was 42.
