= Fabio Filzi =

Italian Irredentist

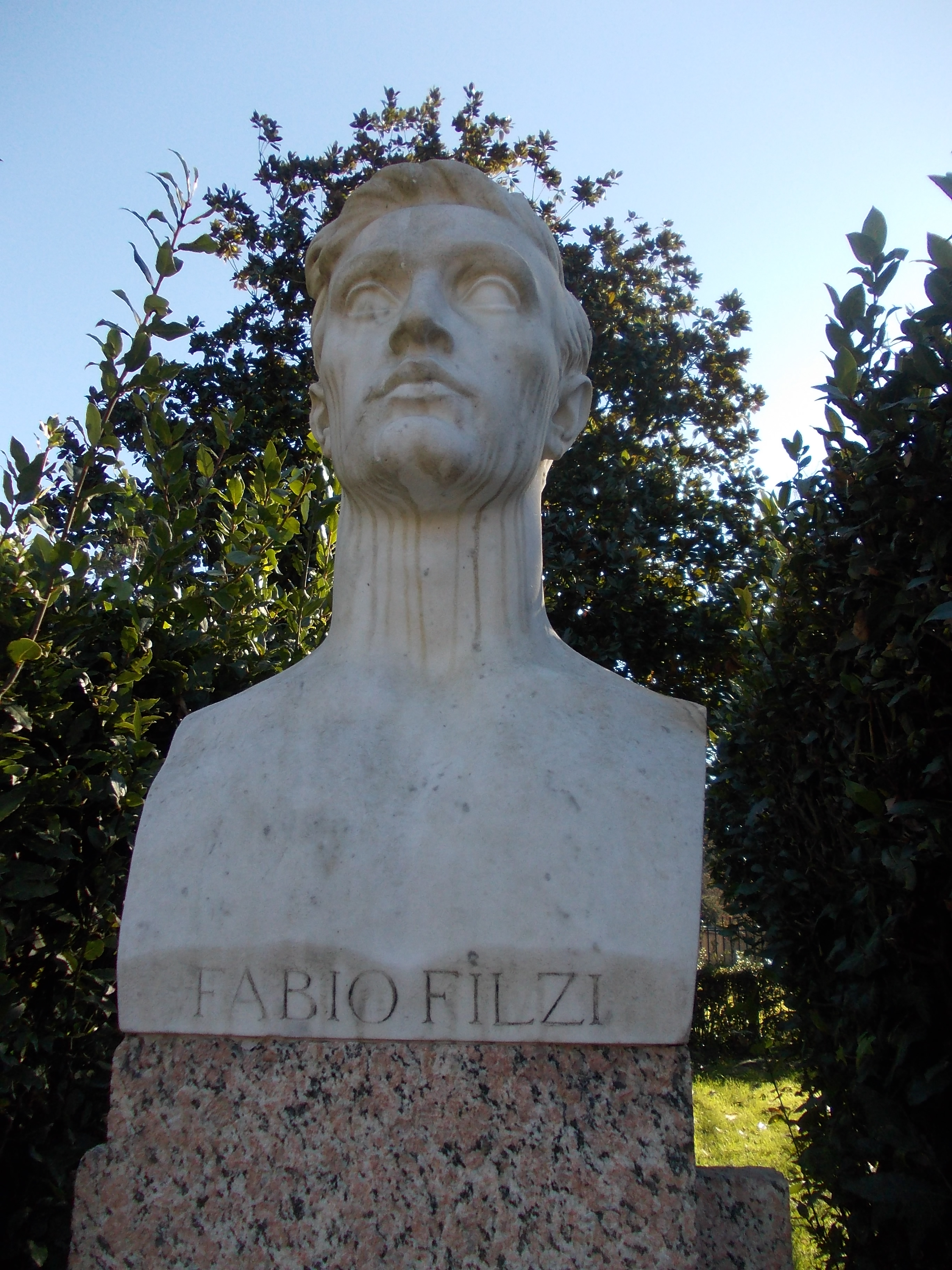
- Marble bust of Fabio Filzi at Pincio, Rome
- Born: 20 November 1884; Pisino, Austria-Hungarian Empire (Now Pazin, Croatia)
- Died: 12 July 1916 (aged 31); Buonconsiglio Castle, Austria-Hungarian Empire (Buonconsiglio Castle, Italy)
- Military career
- Allegiance: Italy
- Branch: Italian Army
- Service years: 1914–1916
- Rank: Second Lieutenant
- Commands: Vicenza Battalion
- Conflicts: First World War: Battle of Monte Corno (executed)
- Awards: Medal of Military Valor; War Merit Cross; Medal of merit for the volunteers of the Italian-Austrian war 1915–1918

Fabio Filzi (20 November 1884 – 12 July 1916) was an ethnic Italian who was born in the Austria-Hungarian Empire but was an irredentist patriot whose firm belief was that the Italian portions of Austria-Hungarian Empire should be united with Italy. He was captured and executed by the Austria-Hungarian Army with his superior Cesare Battisti.

== Early life ==
He was born in Pisino, Istria (now Pazin, Croatia), the second of the four sons of Giovanni Battista (1852-1933) and Amelia Ivancich (1861-1942). His mother was an Istrian Italian native of Pisino. His father was originally from Borgo Sacco, near Rovereto, but worked as a teacher of classical philology in the high schools of Pisino and Capodistria (now Koper, Slovenia). In 1892 he obtained the chair at the high school of Rovereto and returned to Trentino, bringing the family with him. As a result, Filzi began his high school studies in Koper and finished them brilliantly in Rovereto in 1902. He came into contact with the irredentist circles of Trentino in 1901–1903.

In 1904, at the inauguration of the Italian law faculty of the University of Innsbruck, there had been clashes instigated by the Germans that had caused a death, several injuries and numerous arrests among the Italians, including Cesare Battisti; following these events, Filzi was head of the Rovereto protest movement. In the same year, he was conscripted, and placed in the 4th hunting regiment of Salzburg of the Austria-Hungarian Empire. In November he ended up under investigation on charges of having favoured the desertion of an Italian comrade; he was acquitted but was dismissed as "politically suspect" at the time of discharge. In the following years he was recalled three times, as usual, for military exercises and on one of these occasions he challenged an officer to a duel who had pronounced insults against Italy; only the intervention of the commander averted the clash.

In 1905, in the presence of some Treviso gymnasts visiting Rovereto, he recited an impassioned speech against the Austro-Hungarian empire and promised his commitment to the cause of the Italians in the unredeemed lands. In the meantime he attended university studies, enrolling at the same time in Graz at the faculty of law and in Trieste at the "Revoltella" commercial school. He took an active part in the National League, the Society of Trentino students and the Giovine Trieste.

In November 1906 he went with his brother Ezio to Graz to join the Italian students who, asking for more government concessions in school, had blocked university activities. Both were injured in clashes with German ethnic elements. After graduating in law from the University of Graz in 1910, he returned first to Trieste and then to Rovereto, where he devoted himself to being a lawyer at the law firm of Antonio Piscel.

== Military career ==
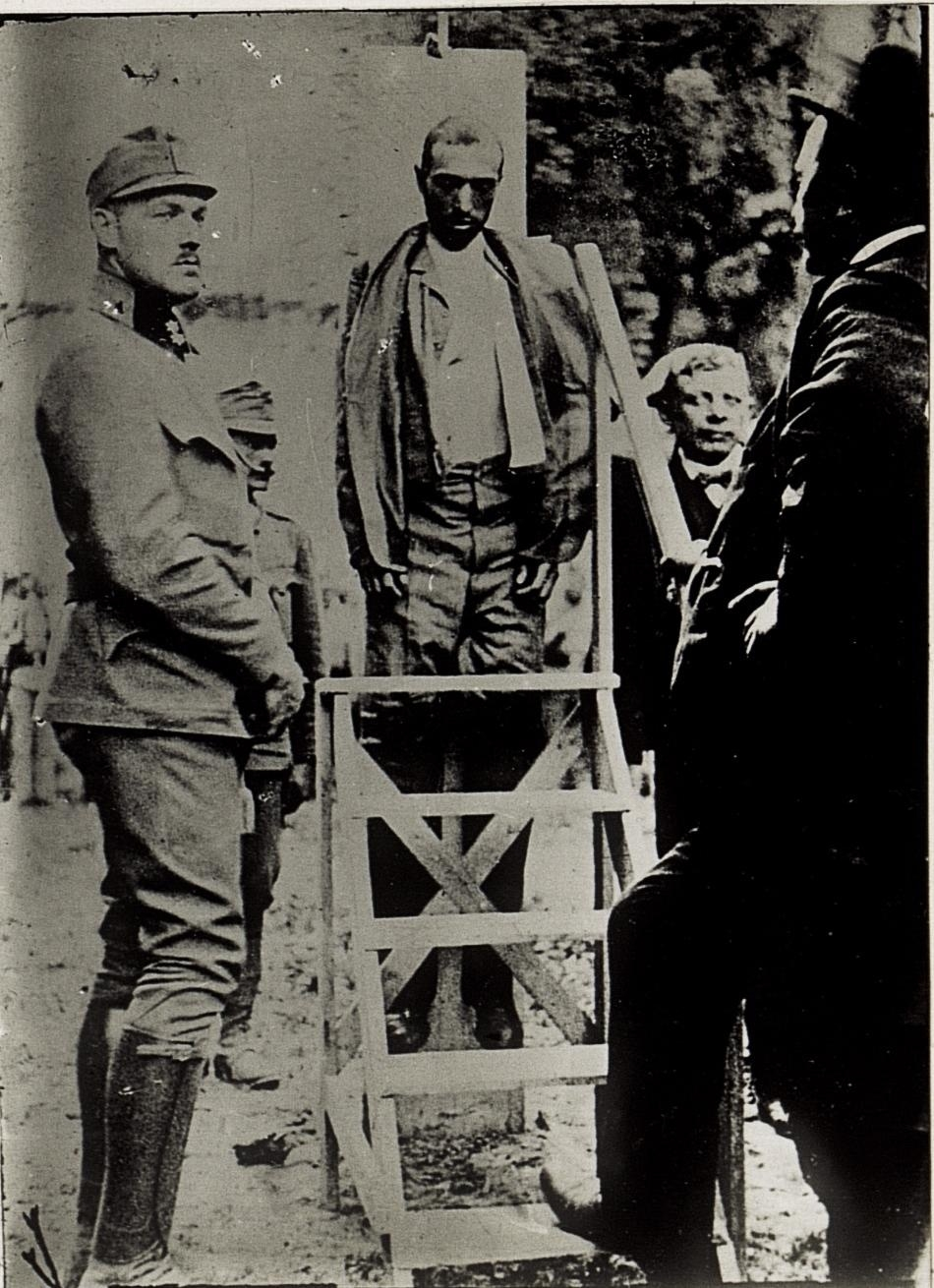
Execution photo of Fabio Filzi

He deserted the Austro-Hungarian army to fight, as a volunteer for Italy, in the First World War. On 10 July 1916 the Vicenza Battalion, formed by the 59th, 60th, and 61st Companies and a Marching Company commanded by Lieutenant Cesare Battisti, of which the second lieutenant Filzi was subordinate, received the order to occupy Monte Corno (m. 1765) on the right of the Leno in Vallarsa.

=== Capture and death sentence ===
He was taken prisoner together with Cesare Battisti on 10 July 1916 and recognized immediately after his superior. Almost certainly the Austrians had been informed for some days of the presence of Battisti in the area, but not of that of Filzi. In the episode, the Trentino soldier Bruno Franceschini, an Austrian soldier, was present during the hours of the capture of the two irredentists. With Battisti, he was brought to Trento, tried and sentenced to death for high treason. The sentence was executed by hanging at 19.30 on 12 July 1916 in the Buonconsiglio Castle, Austria-Hungarian Empire, now Buonconsiglio Castle in Italy. In Arzignano, a town where he was a guest before leaving for the front, a monument was dedicated to him.

== Honours ==
- HMS Upright sunk the Italian freighter Fabio Filzi on 13 December 1941. HMS Utmost had earlier attacked and missed the freighter on 12 December 1941.
- In 1966 his likeness was displayed on an Italian postage stamp
- One of the Tunnels (No. 13) in the Strada delle 52 Gallerie is named after him.

== Fausto Filzi ==
In September 1916, following the execution, Fabio's brother Fausto Filzi decided to return to Italy from Argentina, the place where he was working, to avenge his brother's martyrdom. Arriving in command of Verona on 21 October he volunteered in the 9th Artillery regiment from Fortress with the rank of second lieutenant. He died on 8 June 1917, on Monte Zebio in a battle which earned him the silver medal for military valour.

== Bibliography ==
Notes

References

- Guðmundur, Helgason (2020). "HMS Utmost (N 19)". uboat.net.
- Dal Lago, Enrico; Róisín, Healy; Gearóid, Barry, eds. (2017). 1916 in Global Context: An anti-Imperial moment. Routledge. ISBN 9781351718240. - Total pages: 232
- Nicolini, Francesco (2016). FORT VERENA, May 24, 1915, 04:00 Trilogy of the Great War: from the memories of the peasant-infantryman Elmo Cermaria, Nonno Peppe. Edizioni Il Fiorino Modena. ISBN 9788875496760. - Total pages: 624
- Wrecksite (2020). "MV Fabio Filzi (+1941)". Wrecksite.
