= Cristoforo Rampelli =

Italian jurist, vicar

Cristoforo Rampelli (fl. 1674–1686) was an Istrian Italian jurist, vicar, and captain of the County of Pisino from 1674 to 1686.

== Biography ==
He was born in Pisino, Istria (then part of the Duchy of Carniola), the son of Martino, from a noble Pisino family, later elevated to barons, who traced their origin to the Aeolian Island of Salina.

He studied at the University of Padua from 1648 to 1649. He received his diploma utriusque juris in the winter of 1650. He became a vicar, and later captain of the County of Pisino, serving in this capacity from 1674 to 1686. He married Maddalena Inzaghi. Their son, Giorgio, married Teresa, daughter of baron Camillo Formentini, in the 1710s.
