= Leonard Bagni =

Leonard Bagni (8 December 1593 – 2 October 1650) also Bagni, Bagnoni was Catholic priest, Jesuit, theologian, philosopher, physicist and missionary from Mitterburg (Italian: Pisino; Croatian: Pazin), in Istria.

His manual for students of Mary's congregation (Manuale Sodalitatis Immaculatae Conceptionis B. Mariae Virginis) was very widespread in the Austrian Monarchy.

== Biography ==
Bagni was born in Pisino (Croatian: Pazin), on 8 December 1593. He finished high school in Laibach (Ljubljana). He joined the Jesuits in the Moravian city of Brno in 1610. He was in the novitiate for two years and then studied philosophy. He was teacher at the Jesuit college in Zagreb for two years, from 1615 to 1617. He then studied theology in Rome. He was set to ship with a mission to India, but sudden hindrances prevented this. He studied theology again in Graz, and was a missionary for a year in the so-called Turkish mission in Pécs, Hungary. Since 1624, he was a professor of moral theology in Ljubljana. For the two years that followed, he was a professor of rhetoric in Graz. In 1627 he was professor of philosophy in Vienna. His Viennese physics lectures were recorded in manuscript in 1628 by his student Georgio Winkler, also a Jesuit. They were collected in the work Physica. He then taught metaphysics and was the dean of the Faculty of Philosophy. He was then a school director and preacher in Rijeka (Italian: Fiume), and then rector of the Jesuit college of that city from 1634 to 1637. After that, he was again in Vienna, where he was a professor of moral theology and director of lower schools from 1639. In 1646 he went to Trieste, where he became a priest in the Trieste college and leader of house of discussions on moral issues. He was a professor of Scripture in Graz for the following two years. In 1650 he returned to Zagreb, where he was rector of the college. Not long thereafter, he fell seriously ill and died on 2 October 1650.
