= Croatian Gymnasium of Pazin =

- Pazin, Istria County; Croatia

Information
- Type: public school
- Established: 1899; 127 years ago
- Campus: Urban

The Croatian Gymnasium of Pazin (Croatian: Hrvatska gimnazija u Pazinu) was a public coeducational gymnasium located in Pazin, the historic administrative centre of the Istrian hinterland, formerly organized as the March of Istria. The school opened in 1899 under the official name of Imperial and Royal Great State Gymnasium during the Austro-Hungarian rule and operated until 1918, when the region was incorporated into the Kingdom of Italy.

It served as a central Slavic speaking educational institution in Istria, educating primarily the Croat community but also a significant number of Slovene-speaking students who accounted for 440 out of a total of 2,511 enrolled between its founding and 1913.

== History ==
The first gymnasium in Pazin was established in 1836 with German language as the language of instruction. 1867 constitutional provisions of Austria-Hungary provided for native language education in those parts of the empire where various nationalities of the empire lived. The municipality of Pazin was a site of ethnic competition between the Croatian and Italian communities, with the Italian party holding power between 1868 and 1886, and the Croatian party coming to power after 1886.

Illyrian movement in Istria brought new efforts by the Pazin municipal authorities to secure education in native language. At the same time, Italian movement argued for transformation of the existing German gymnasium in Pazin into a school with Italian as the language of instruction. Austrian authorities decided on 24 August 1899 to establish an eight-grade classical gymnasium in Pazin under the name of the Imperial and Royal Great State Gymnasium. Announcement of the new Croatian gymnasium caused strong opposition among Italians in Istria, Gorizia and Trieste. A large protest meeting took place in Trieste on 15 January 1899, adopting a resolution against the "imposition of Slavic schools" and specifically against the Croatian gymnasium in Pazin. In early November 1918, the Italian army entered Pazin and the Croatian Gymnasium was abolished in the immediate afterwards.

After 1945, when Istria was transferred from Kingdom of Italy to Federal People's Republic of Yugoslavia after the end of World War II, the school was restored this time officially under the name of Croatian Real Gymnasium of Pazin. In 1972, the Gymnasium became the Secondary School Center Otokar Keršovani. In 1992–1993, the center was transformed into the High School Juraj Dobrila which among other, offers gymnasium education.

== See also ==
- Pazin Castle
