= Trviž =

Trviž Terviso, Villa Terviso
- Village
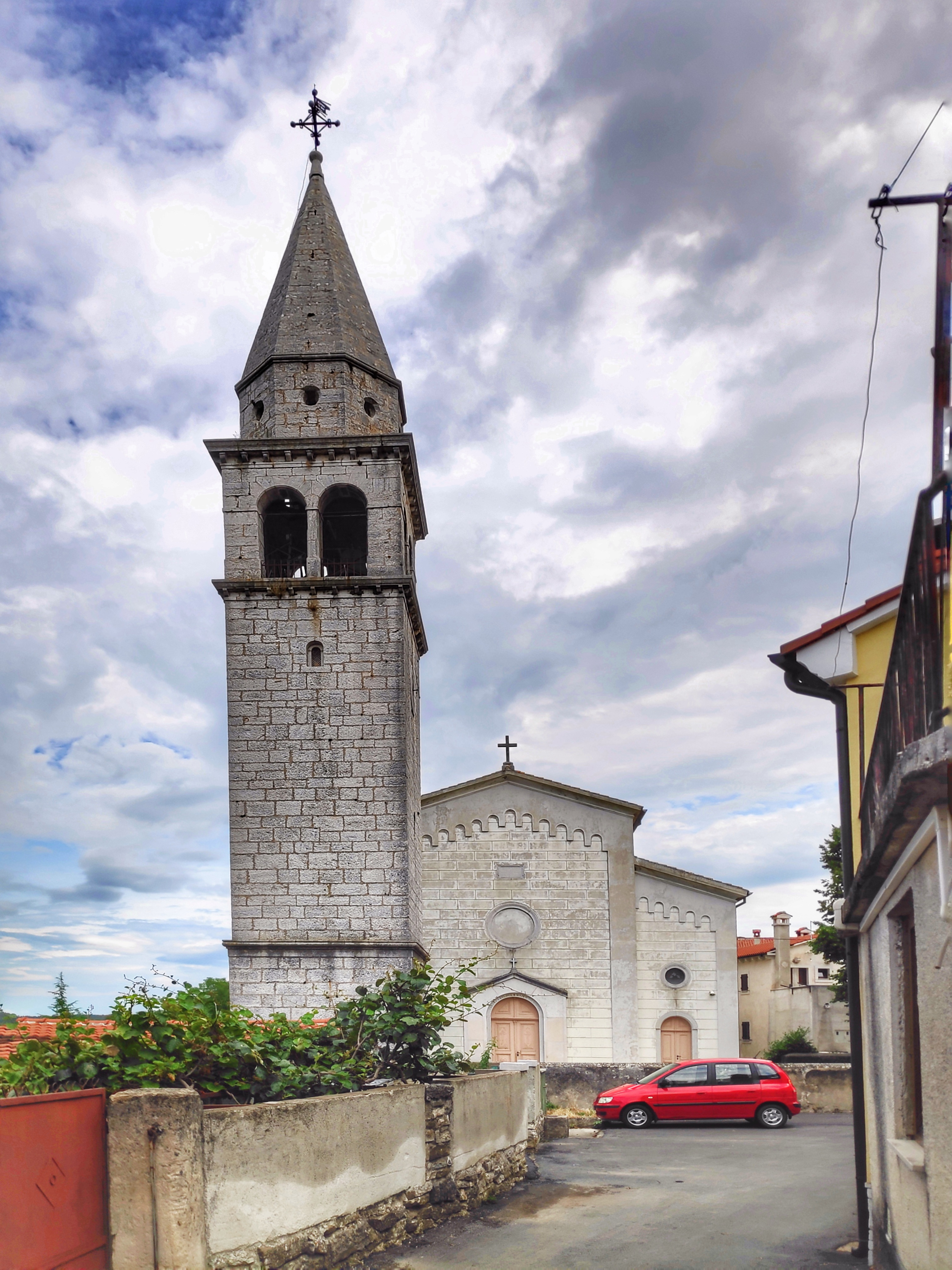

- Location within Croatia
- Coordinates: 45.2753717°N 13.8405757°E
- Country: Croatia
- County: Istria County
- Municipality: Pazin

Area
  - Total: 3.3 sq mi (8.6 km^{2})

Population (2021)
  - Total: 416
  - Density: 130/sq mi (48/km^{2})
- Time zone: UTC+1 (CET)
  - Summer (DST): UTC+2 (CEST)
- Postal code: 52000 Pazin
- Area code: 052

Trviž (Italian: Terviso or Villa Terviso) is a village in the municipality of Pazin, Istria in Croatia.

== Demographics ==
According to the 2021 census, its population was 416.
