= Kašćerga =

Kašćerga Caschierga, Villa Padova
- Village
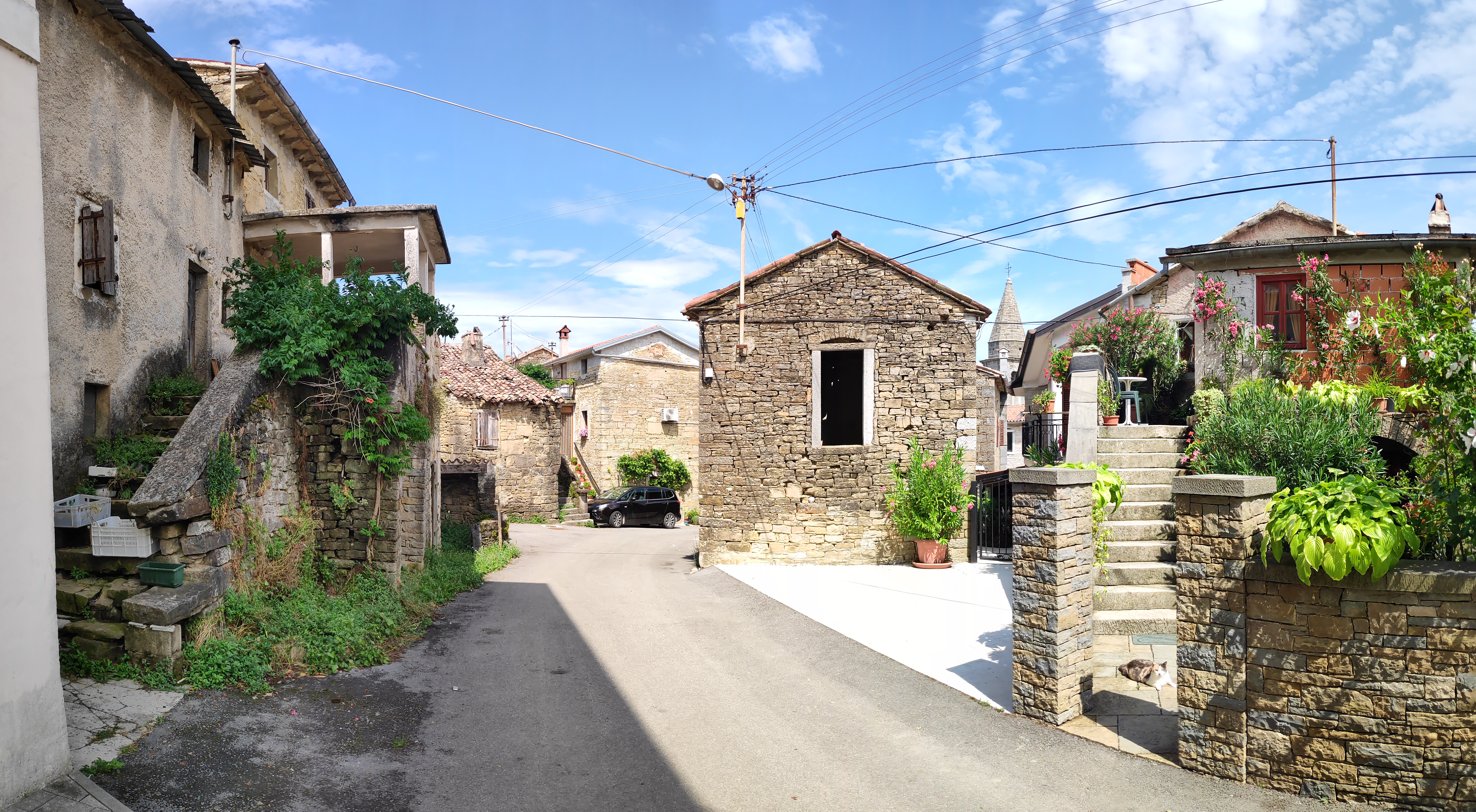

- Location within Croatia
- Coordinates: 45.306286°N 13.8643017°E
- Country: Croatia
- County: Istria County
- Municipality: Pazin

Area
  - Total: 4.4 sq mi (11.5 km^{2})

Population (2021)
  - Total: 235
  - Density: 52.9/sq mi (20.4/km^{2})
- Time zone: UTC+1 (CET)
  - Summer (DST): UTC+2 (CEST)
- Postal code: 52000 Pazin
- Area code: 052

Kašćerga (Italian: Caschierga or Villa Padova) is a village in the municipality of Pazin, Istria in Croatia.

== Demographics ==
According to the 2021 census, its population was 235.
