= Lovrin, Istria County =

Lovrin Laurini
- Village
- Location within Croatia
- Coordinates: 45.2331036°N 13.8856102°E
- Country: Croatia
- County: Istria County
- Municipality: Pazin

Area
  - Total: 2.1 sq mi (5.5 km^{2})

Population (2021)
  - Total: 328
  - Density: 150/sq mi (60/km^{2})
- Time zone: UTC+1 (CET)
  - Summer (DST): UTC+2 (CEST)
- Postal code: 52000 Pazin
- Area code: 052

Lovrin (Italian: Laurini) is a village in the municipality of Pazin, Istria in Croatia.

== Demographics ==
According to the 2021 census, its population was 328.
