= Butoniga =

Butoniga Bottonega
- Village
- Location within Croatia
- Coordinates: 45.2892011°N 13.9478002°E
- Country: Croatia
- County: Istria County
- Municipality: Pazin

Area
  - Total: 1.8 sq mi (4.6 km^{2})

Population (2021)
  - Total: 66
  - Density: 37/sq mi (14/km^{2})
- Time zone: UTC+1 (CET)
  - Summer (DST): UTC+2 (CEST)
- Postal code: 52000 Pazin
- Area code: 052

Butoniga (Italian: Bottonega) is a village in the municipality of Pazin, Istria in Croatia.

== Climate ==
Since records began in 1987, the highest temperature recorded at the local weather station was 40.2 °C (104.4 °F), on 4 August 2017. The coldest temperature was −14.7 °C (5.5 °F), on 2 March 2005.

== Demographics ==
According to the 2021 census, its population was 66.

== See also ==
- List of Glagolitic inscriptions (16th century)
