= Zamask =

Zamask Zamasco
- Village
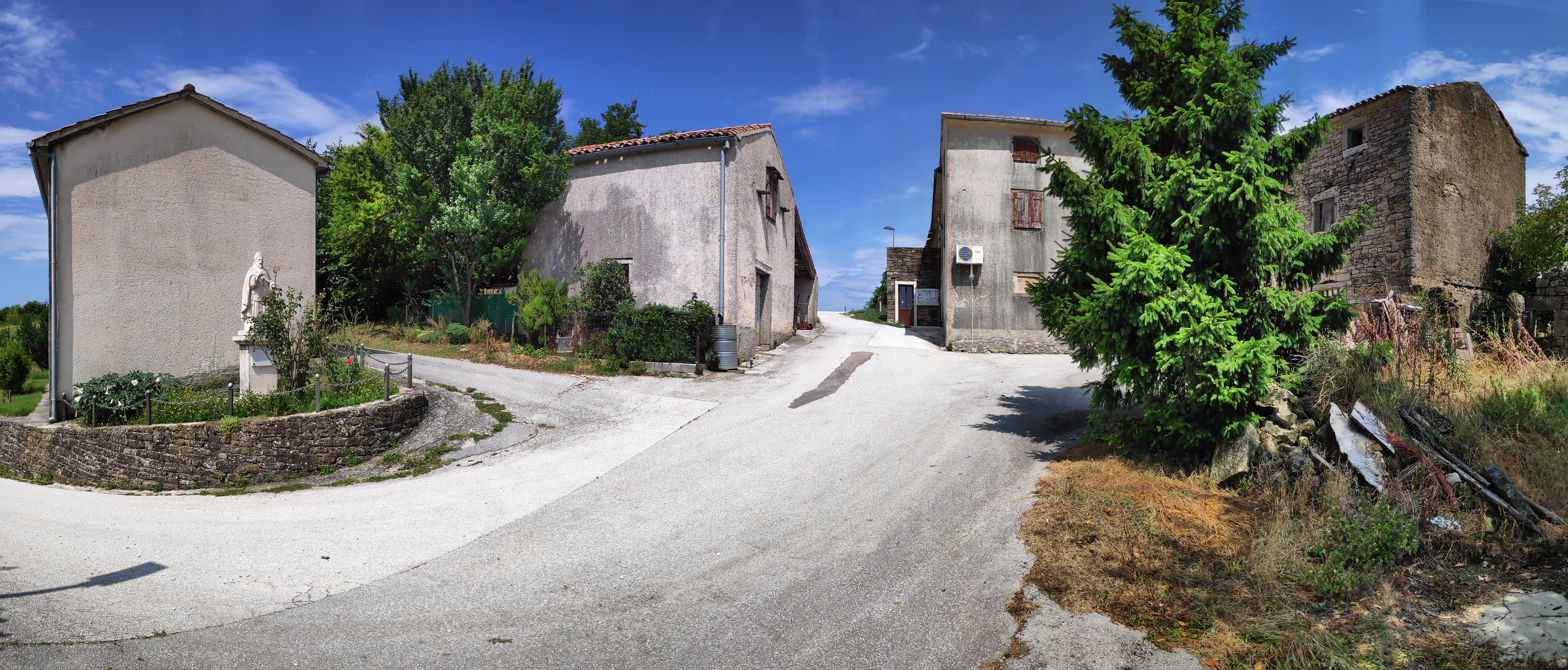

- Location within Croatia
- Coordinates: 45.3184086°N 13.8550835°E
- Country: Croatia
- County: Istria County
- Municipality: Pazin

Area
  - Total: 0.81 sq mi (2.1 km^{2})

Population (2021)
  - Total: 50
  - Density: 62/sq mi (24/km^{2})
- Time zone: UTC+1 (CET)
  - Summer (DST): UTC+2 (CEST)
- Postal code: 52000 Pazin
- Area code: 052

Zamask (Italian: Zamasco) is a village in the municipality of Pazin, Istria in Croatia.

== Demographics ==
According to the 2021 census, its population was 50.
