= Pier Antonio Quarantotti Gambini =

Italian journalist and writer

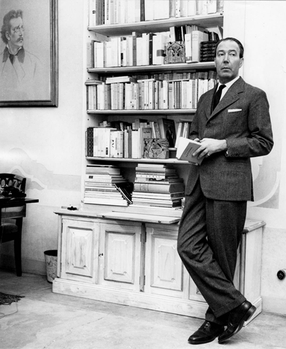
- Pier Antonio Quarantotti Gambini
- Born: Pier Antonio Quarantotti Gambini; 23 February 1910; Pisino d'Istria, Austria-Hungary
- Died: 22 April 1965 (aged 55); Venice, Italy
- Occupations: Novelist, poet, journalist
- Writing career
- Language: Italian
- Genres: Fiction, poetry

Pier Antonio Quarantotti Gambini (Italian pronunciation: [ˈpjɛr anˈtɔːnjo kwaranˈtɔtti ɡamˈbiːni]; 23 February 1910 – 22 April 1965) was an Italian writer and journalist, author of novels, poetry, and essays.

== Biography ==
Quarantotti Gambini was born in Pisino, Istria, then part of Austria-Hungary, in an Italian family originally from Rovigno. His father, Giovanni, a teacher, was a prominent Italian irredentist militant in Istria. His family would let a flag of the Lombard league with the coat of arms of the city of Capodistria wave from the window of their villa during Austrian times. During the first World War, his father ended up with Vito Timmel in a semi-internment camp for military personnel of "unascertained loyalty" in Radkersburg. His mother, Fides Histriae Gambini, was from Capodistria (today Koper, Slovenia), where Pier Antonio spent much of his childhood and teenage years, in the villa of his maternal grandfather in Semedella. This place would figure in many of his novels. Istria was integrated into the Kingdom of Italy in 1919 as a result of World War I, fulfilling the aspirations of Quarantotti's father.

Quarantotti Gambini met Richard Hughes in 1927, as the English writer was travelling in Istria, and received literary advice from him. He became friends with Umberto Saba in 1929 in Trieste. He left Capodistria soon after to study law in Milan and Turin, where he graduated in 1937 from the University of Turin. In 1932, he published his first short stories, collected in the volume I nostri simili. From 1933, he worked for the newspaper La Stampa. He was sent as a war reporter to cover the Ethiopian War, then the Spanish Civil War. In 1937, his first novel, La Rosa Rossa was published by the publisher Treves, in Milan.

During World War II, he was director of the city library of Trieste, from where, given his opposition to the annexation of Trieste and Istria to Yugoslavia, he had to flee in 1945 when Josip Broz Tito's Yugoslav Partisans entered the city. He settled in Venice, where he lived the rest of his life. From 1945 until 1949, he was head of a semi-clandestine radio aimed at Italians in the Free Territory of Trieste, Radio Venezia Giulia. He was an advocate for an independent Istria, but the London memorandum of 1954 partitioned the Free Territory, giving Trieste to Italy, but the rest of Istria to Yugoslavia. From then on, Quarantotti Gambini was not authorized to visit the places of his birth and youth. His major works date from this period of exile, and are heavily autobiographical (Amor militare, 1955, Il Cavallo Tripoli). His 1958 novel La Calda Vita is a subtle exploration of the transition from childhood to adulthood, its sensuality and cruelty.

He received the Bagutta Prize in 1948 for L'Onda dell'incrociatore. In 1963, he was a member of the jury of the Campiello Prize.

== Selected work ==
=== Prose ===
- I Nostri simili, Solaria, Firenze 1932
- La Rosa rossa, Treves, Milano 1937; Einaudi, Torino 1972
- L'onda dell'incrociatore, Einaudi, Torino 1947 / Oscar Mondadori, 1966 / Palermo: Sellerio, 2000
- Amor militare, Mondadori, Milano 1955
- Il Cavallo Tripoli, Mondadori, Milano 1956
- La Calda vita, Mondadori, Milano 1958
- I giochi di Norma, Einaudi, Torino 1964
- L'amore di Lupo, Einaudi, Torino 1964
- Le redini bianche
- La corsa di Falco

=== Poetry ===
- Racconto d'amore, Mondadori, Milano 1965
- Al sole e al vento, Edizioni Einaudi 1971

=== Essays ===
- Primavera a Trieste, Mondadori, Milano 1951
- Sotto il cielo di Russia, Mondadori, Milano 1963
- Luce di Trieste, Eri, Torino 1964
- I Nobili di Rovigno e delle altre città istriane, diritti e privilegi, Disputazione di storia patria per le Venezie, Venezia 1968

=== Correspondence ===
- Il vecchio e il giovane, Mondadori, Milano 1965
