= Vela Traba =

Vela Traba Traba Grande
- Village
- Location within Croatia
- Coordinates: 45.2456904°N 13.8550964°E
- Country: Croatia
- County: Istria County
- Municipality: Pazin

Area
  - Total: 0.89 sq mi (2.3 km^{2})

Population (2021)
  - Total: 245
  - Density: 280/sq mi (110/km^{2})
- Time zone: UTC+1 (CET)
  - Summer (DST): UTC+2 (CEST)
- Postal code: 52000 Pazin
- Area code: 052

Vela Traba (Italian: Traba Grande) is a village in the municipality of Pazin, Istria in Croatia.

== Demographics ==
According to the 2021 census, its population was 245.
