= Francesco Costantini =

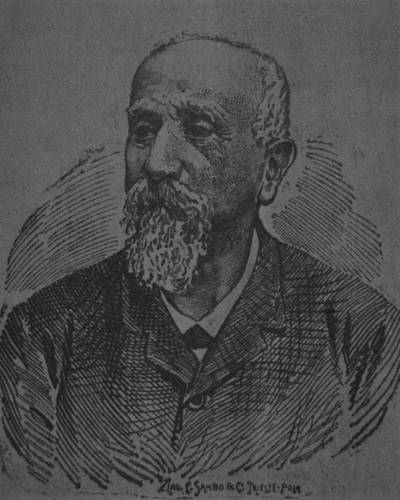

Podestà of Pisino
- In office 1880–1883

Personal details
- Born: 21 August 1827 Pisino, Austrian Empire
- Died: 8 January 1899 (aged 71) Pisino, Austria-Hungary
- Party: Società politica istriana (since 1884)
- Spouse: Clotilde Mrach
- Children: Ettore, Costantino
- Occupation: Politician, lawyer
- Profession: Lawyer

Francesco Costantini (21 August 1827 – 8 January 1899) was an Istrian Italian lawyer and politician, who was Podestà (Mayor) of Pisino (now Pazin, Croatia) from 1880 to 1883. In 1884 he founded in Pisino the Società politica istriana, of which he was also the first president.

== Biography ==
Francesco Costantini was born in Pisino, Austrian Empire (now Pazin, Croatia) on 21 August 1827. A lawyer, he became a member of the Diet of Istria. In 1872, after prolonged insistence, he obtained the clearance for the opening of an Italian gymnasium in Pisino, where instruction was then only provided in the German language. The citizens of Pisino had to wait until 1899 for the school to open, due to procrastination of the Slav members of the Diet.

Costantini was Podestà (Mayor) of Pazin from 1880 until 1883. He is also remembered for founding, in 1884, the political party Società politica istriana ("Istrian political society"), of which he was also the first president. He, alongside Adamo Mrach, is credited with having activated in Pisino "a formidable tool of [Italian] national aggregation and cohesion."

He was married to Clotilde Mrach, from a Pisino family of landowners and politicians, by whom he had two sons: Ettore, also a lawyer and politician, and Costantino, a lawyer, Director of the Council for Tax Administration of Pisino, Head of the Council of Administration of the Comune of Pisino since 1894, and Mayor of Pisino from 1919 until 1922.
