= Rapicio Castle =

Pisino residence of the Rapicio family

- Pazin, Croatia
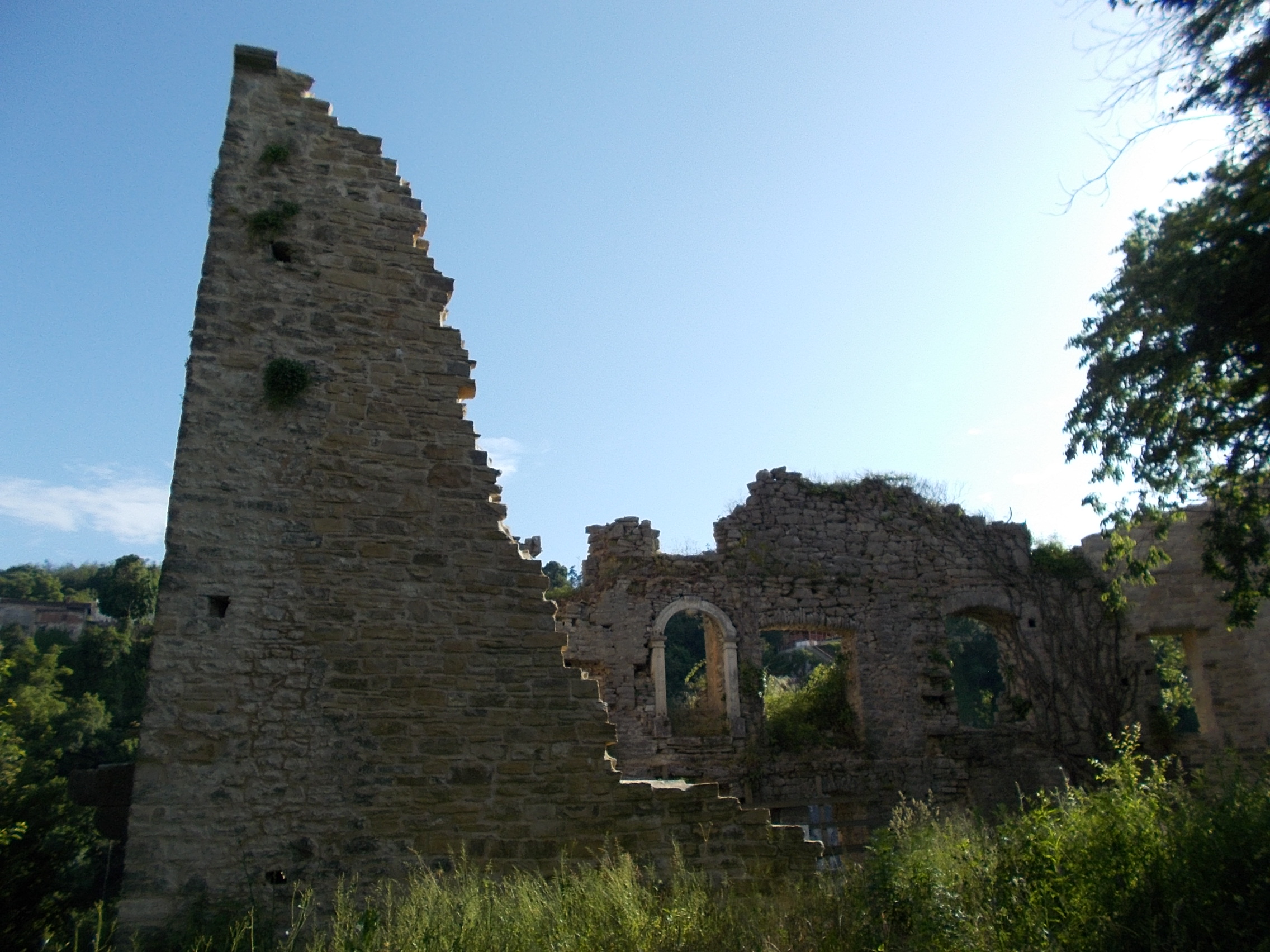
- The ruins of the castle in 2016

Site information
- Type: Castle
- Condition: Ruined

Location
- Coordinates: 45.2406°N 13.9296°E

Site history
- Built: 16th century

The Rapicio Castle (Croatian: Palača Rapicio; Italian: Castello Rapicio), also Rapicio House (Croatian: Kuća Rapicio; Italian: Casa Rapicio) was the residence of the Rapicio family in Pazin, Croatia. Located on the edge of a cliff, it was built in the 16th century. It was bombed together with the Italian gymnasium in World War II, and today the only vestiges are its ruins.

== History ==
The house was built by the Rapicios in the cinquecento. They had moved to Pazin in the same century, inter-marrying with the most prominent families of the County of Pisino. It was built on the edge of a cliff (foiba), near Pazin Castle, probably for safety reasons.

The castle was bombed along with the Italian gymnasium during World War II. Dilapidated, its ruins are still present.

== Gallery ==
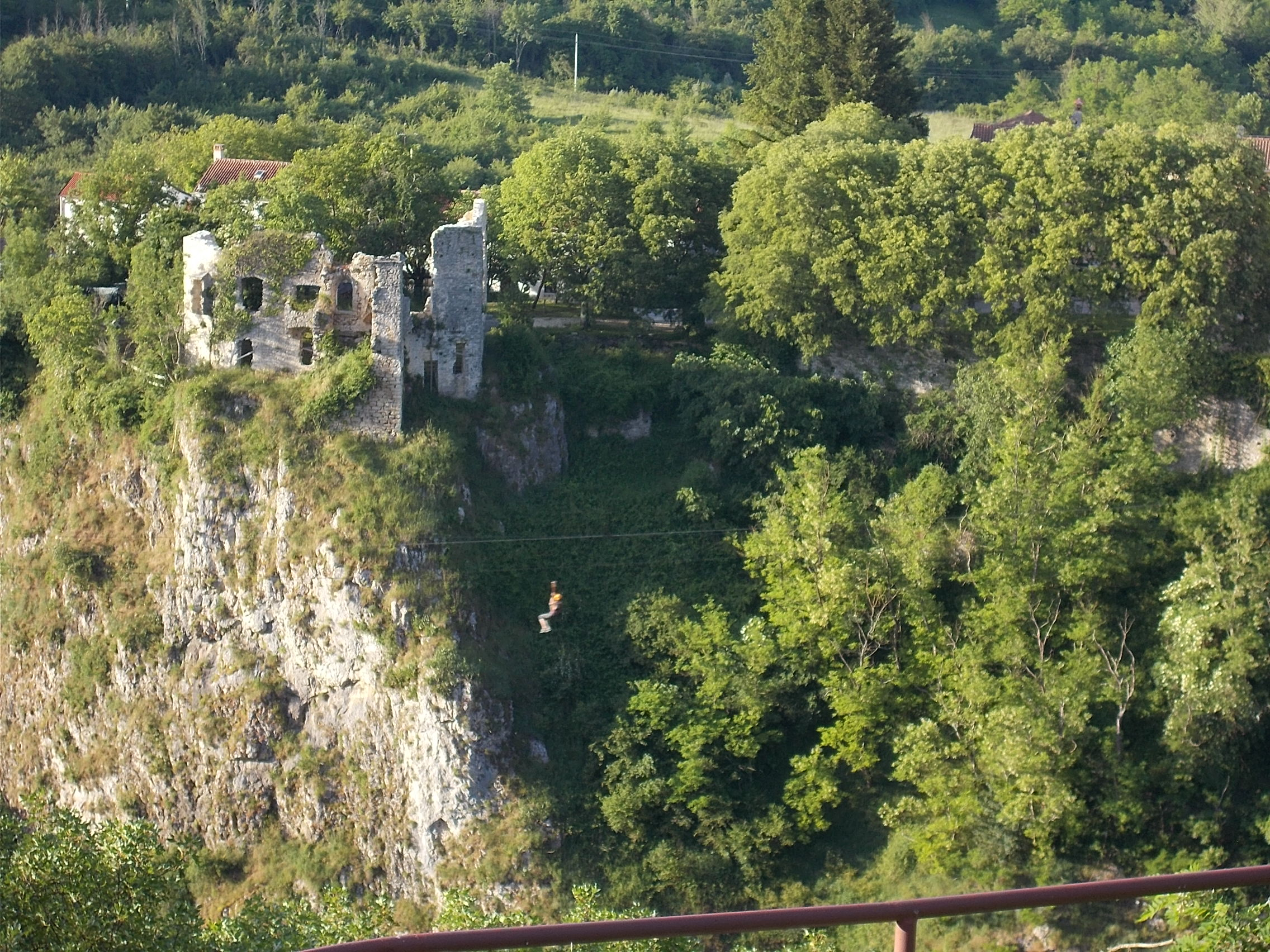
Ruins of the Rapicio Castle, perched over the foiba

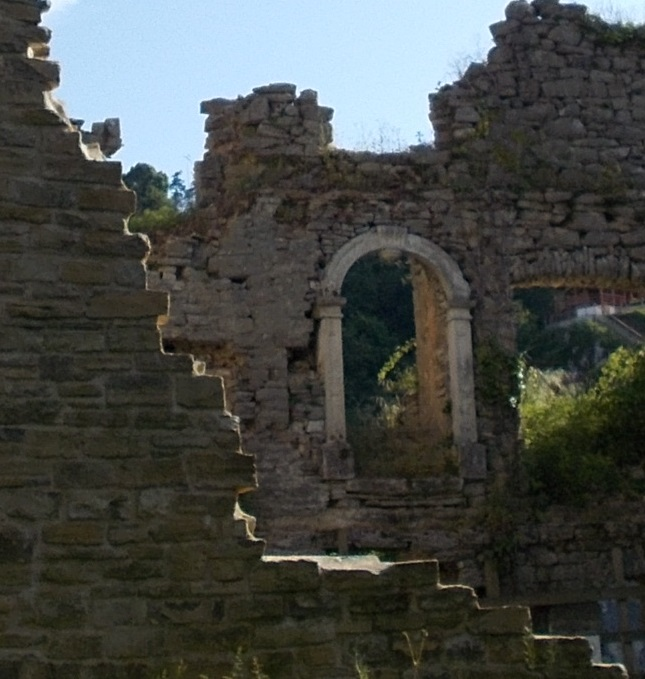
Close-up of window frame
