= Pazin =

- Town
- Grad Pazin; Town of Pazin
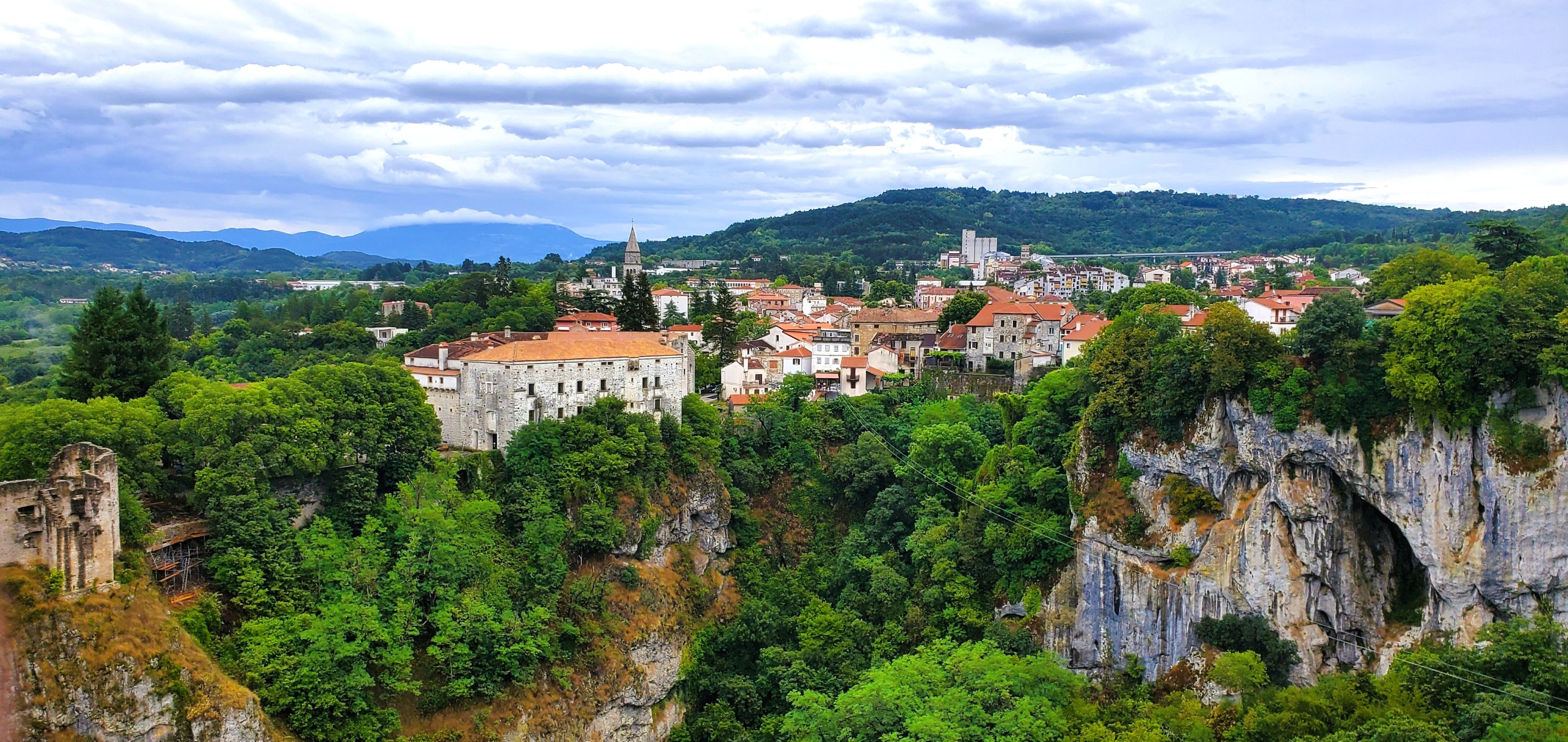
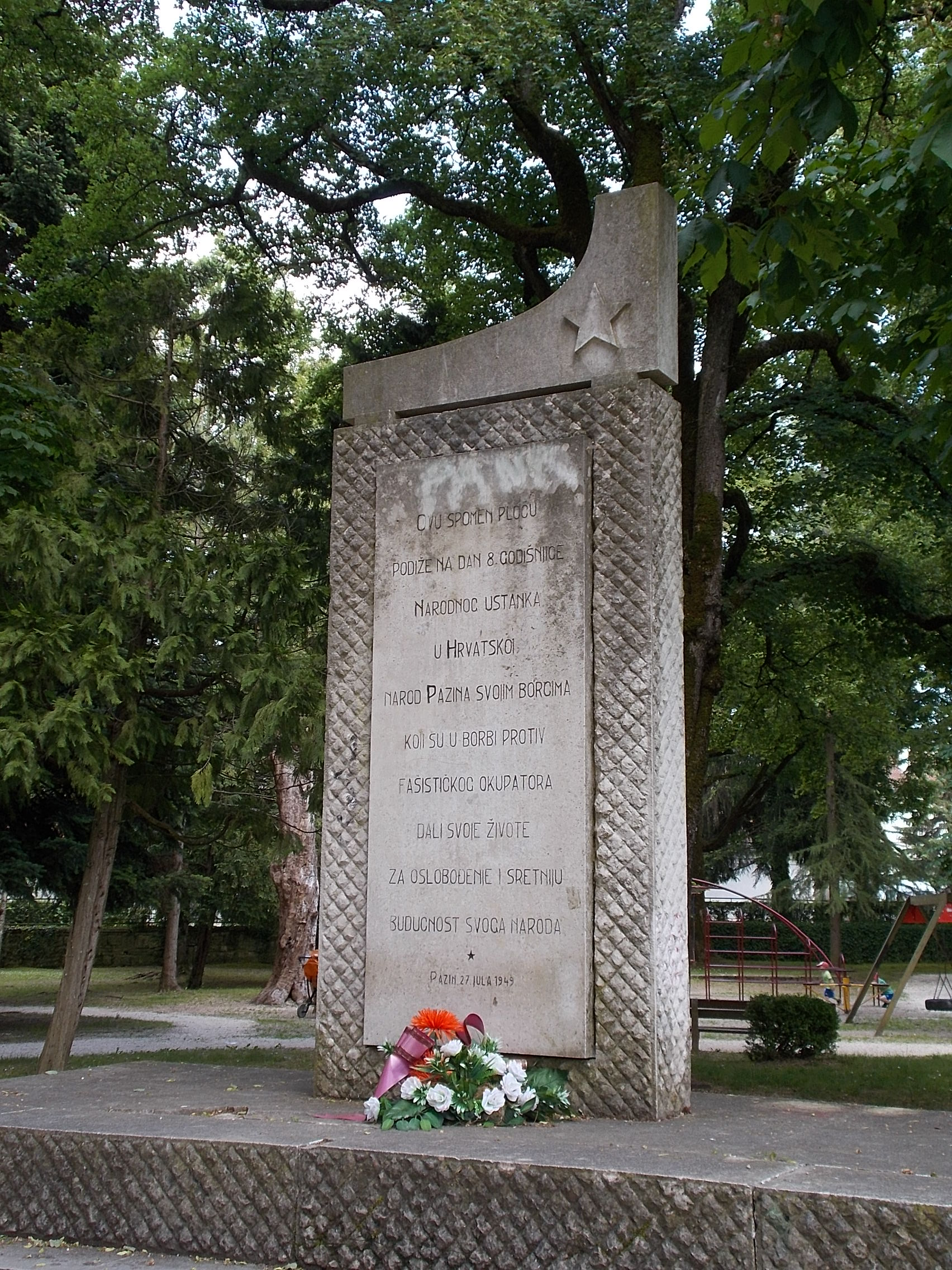
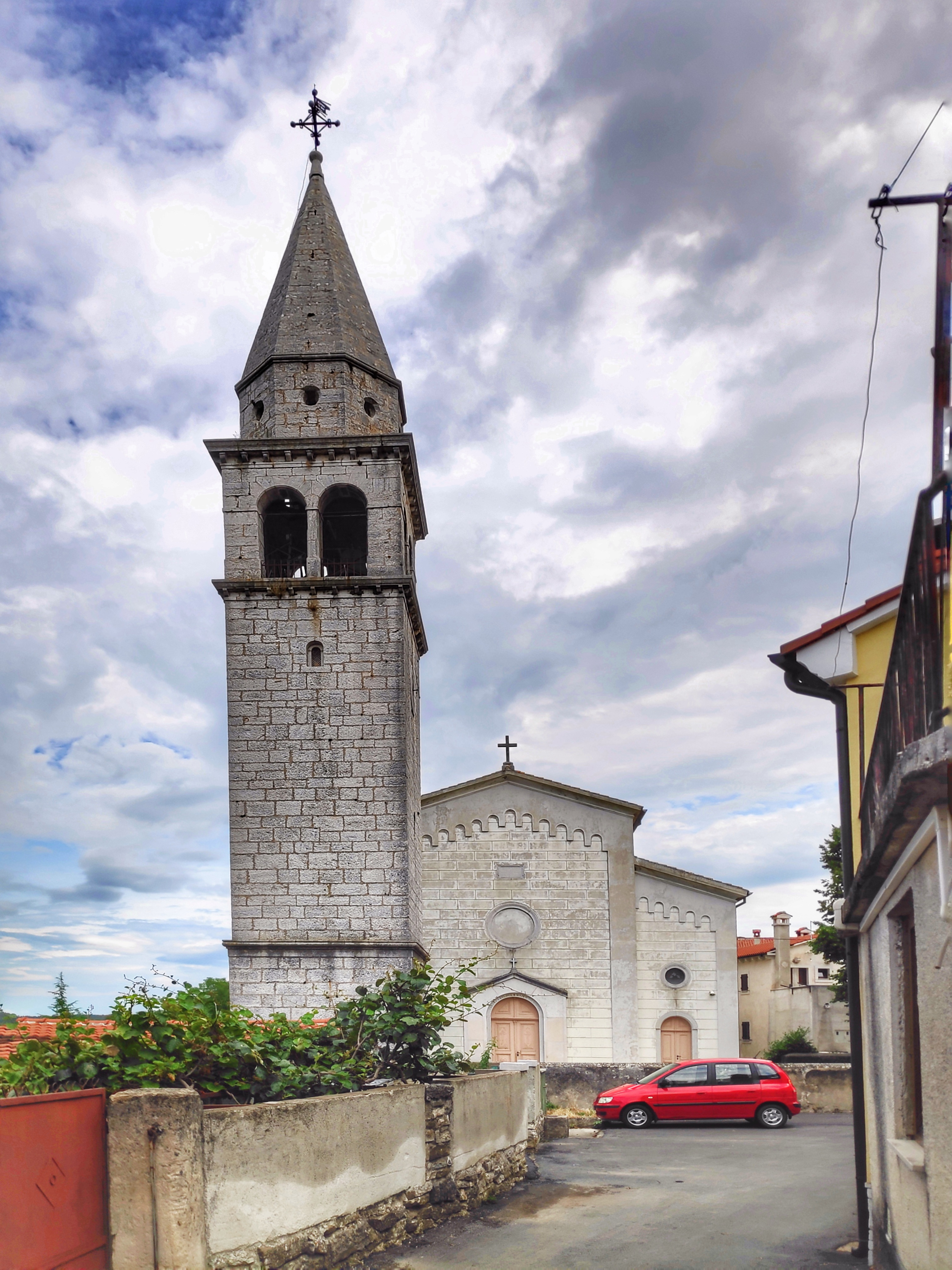
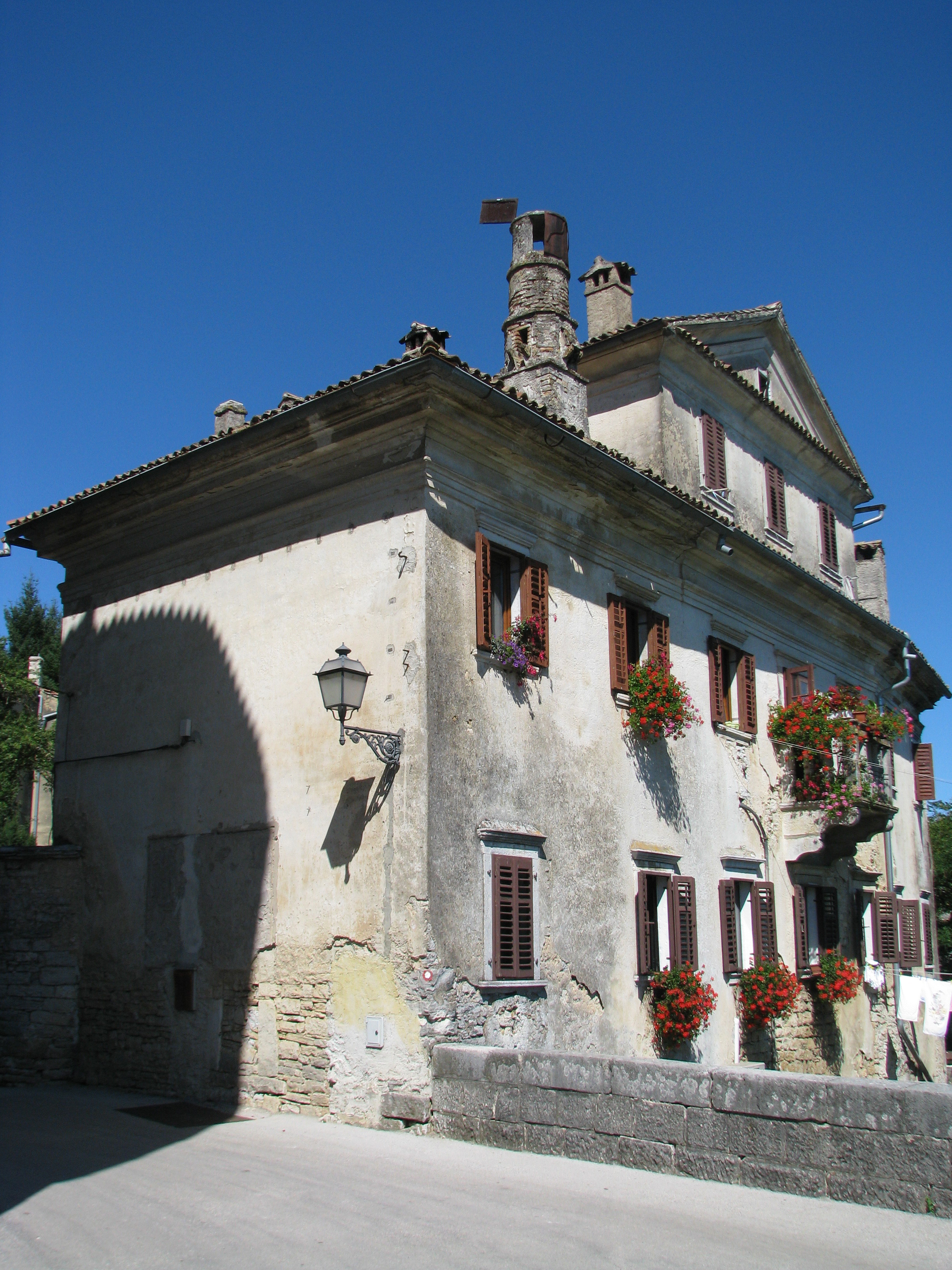
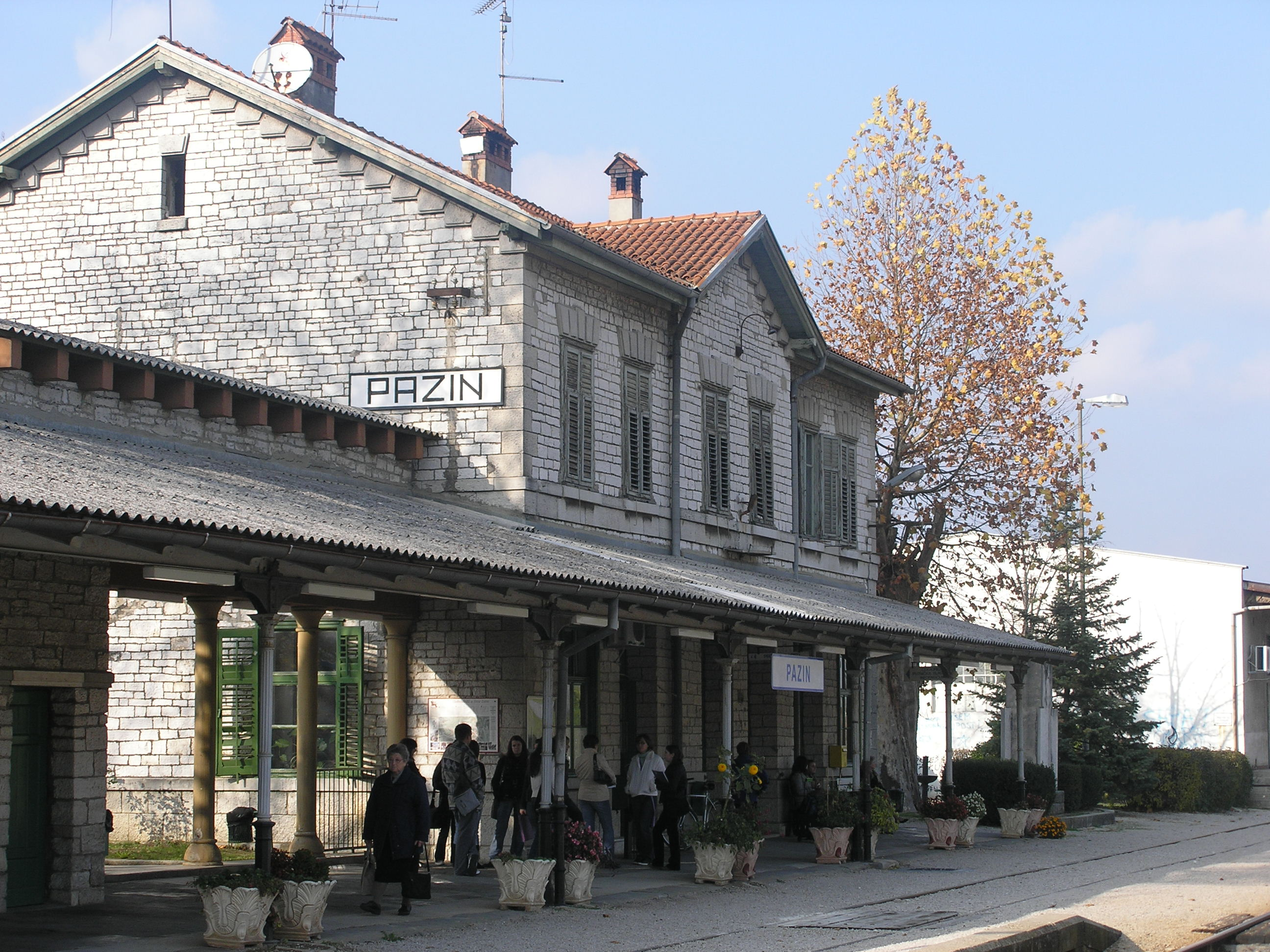
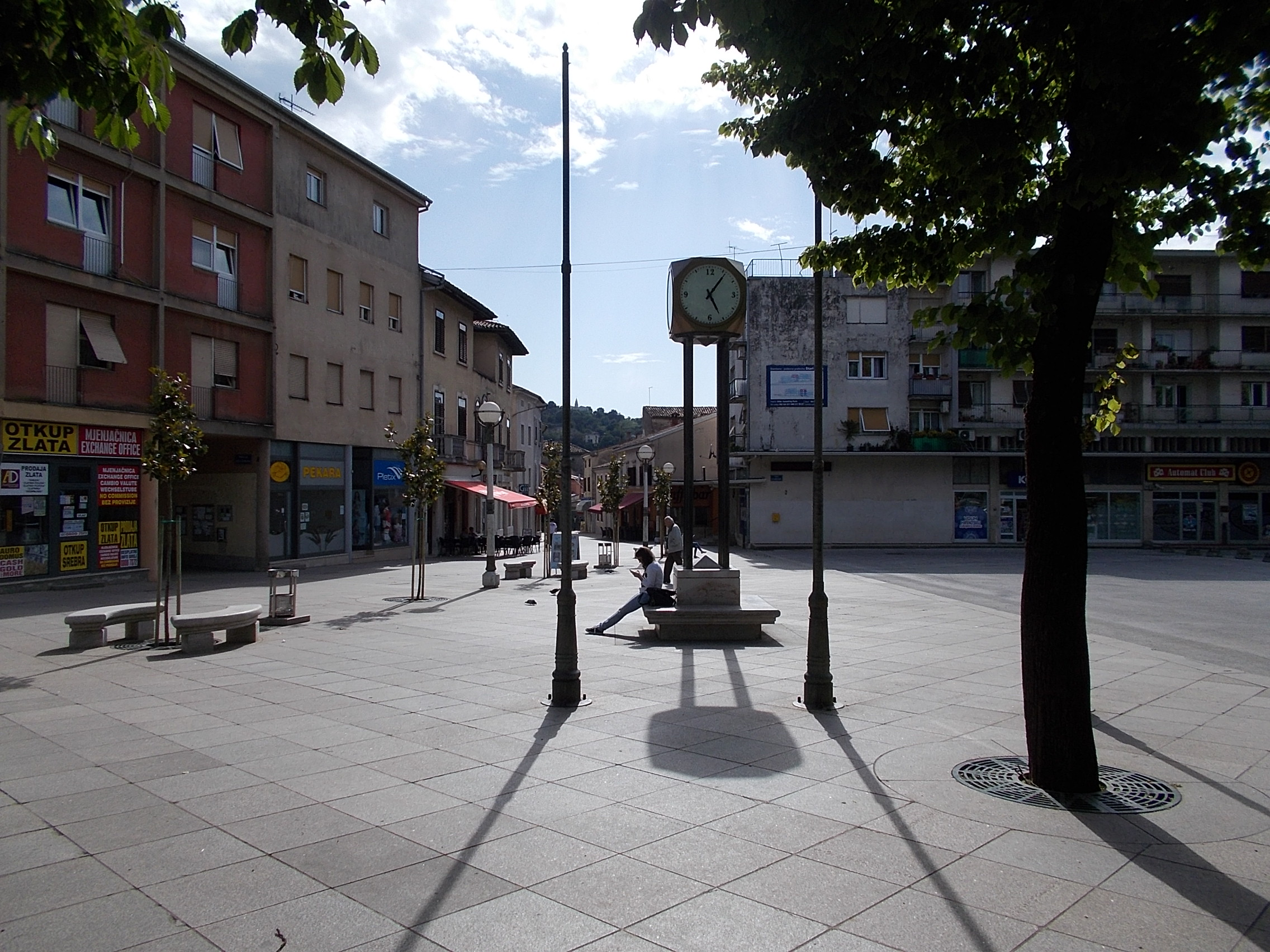
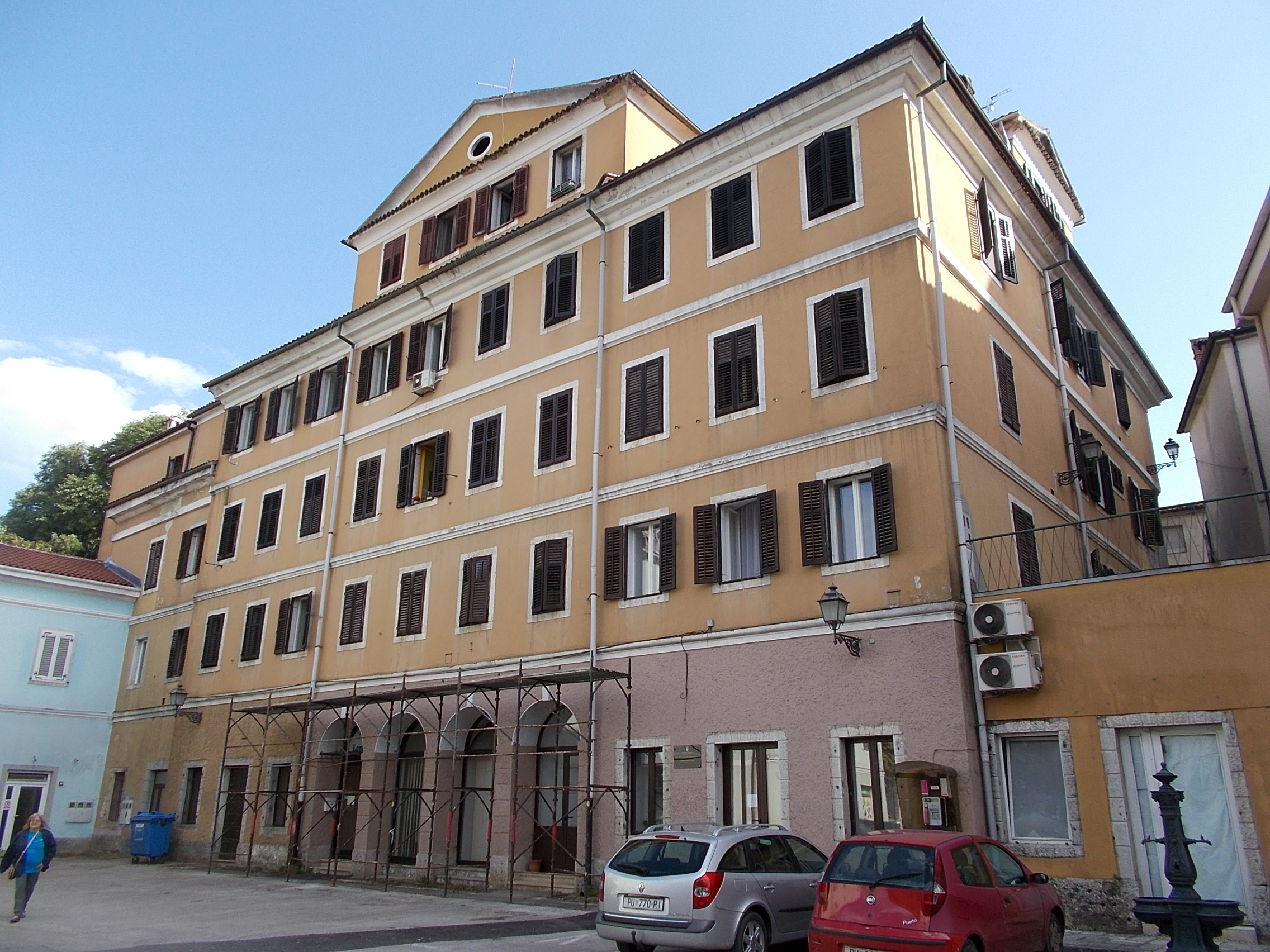
- Pazin

- Flag Coat of arms

- Location of Pazin within Croatia
- Coordinates: 45°14′25″N 13°56′12″E
- Country: Croatia
- Region: Istria
- County: Istria County

Government
  - Mayor: Suzana Jašić (M!)
  - Town Council: 13 members: M! (7); IDS-HNS-HSU (4); HDZ (1); Independents (1)

Area
  - Town: 139.1 km^{2} (53.7 sq mi)
  - Urban: 15.8 km^{2} (6.1 sq mi)
- Elevation: 277 m (909 ft)

Population (2021)
  - Town: 8,279
  - Density: 59.52/km^{2} (154.2/sq mi)
  - Urban: 3,981
  - Urban density: 252/km^{2} (653/sq mi)
- Time zone: UTC+1 (CET)
  - Summer (DST): UTC+2 (CEST)
- Postal code: 52 000
- Area code: 052
- Vehicle registration: PU
- Website: pazin.hr

Pazin is a town in west Croatia, the administrative seat of Istria County. It is known for the medieval Pazin Castle, the former residence of the Istrian margraves.

== Geography ==
The town had a population of 8,638 in 2011, of which 4,386 lived in the urban settlement. In 1991 it was made the capital of the county for its location in the geographical centre of the Istrian peninsula and in order to boost the development of its interior territories.

== Climate ==
Since records began in 1961, the highest temperature recorded at the local weather station at an elevation of 297 metres (974 ft) was 39.5 °C (103.1 °F), on 3 August 2017. The coldest temperature was −18.7 °C (−1.7 °F), on 8 January 1985.

== History ==
=== Antiquity ===
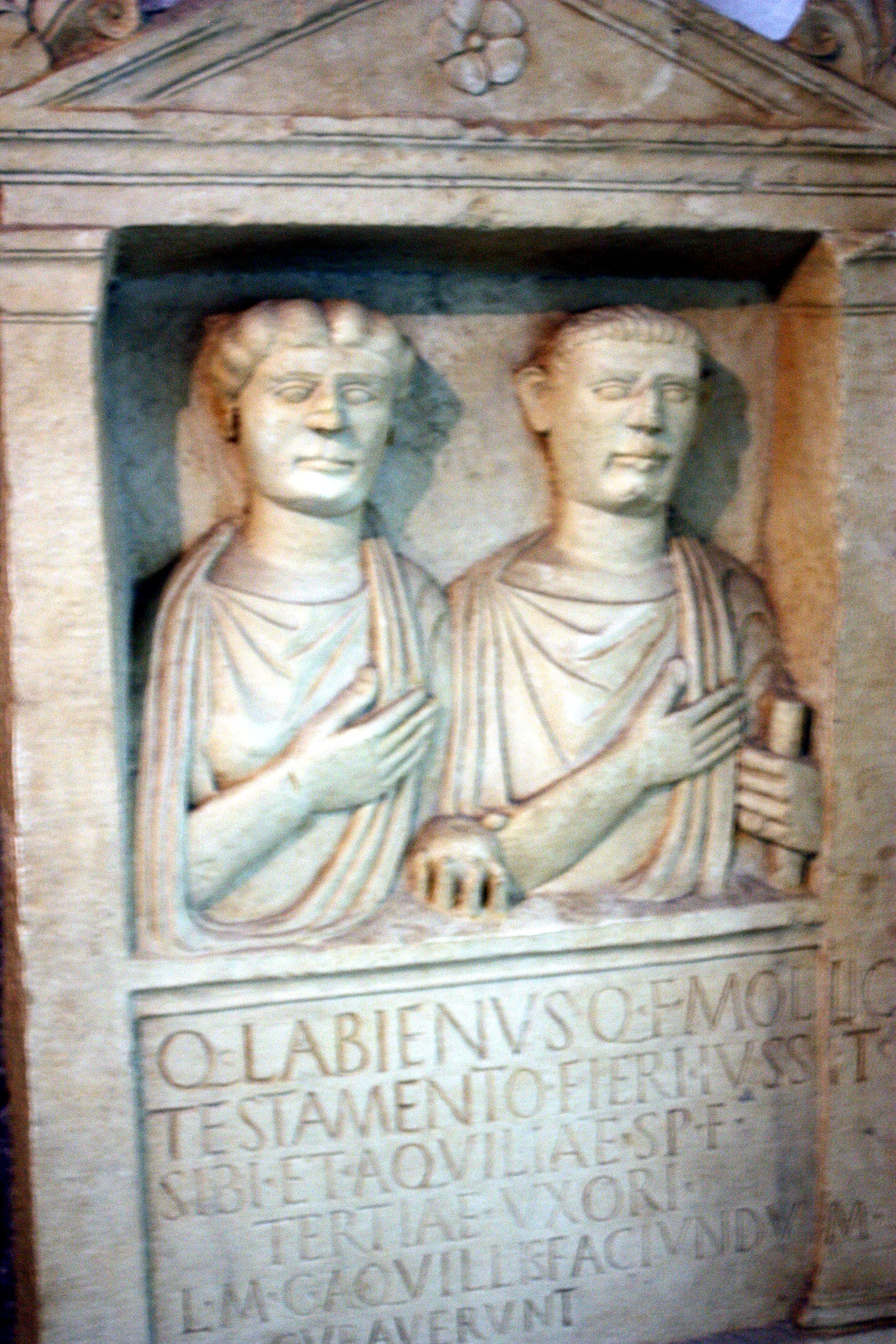
Roman gravestone discovered in Moncalvo di Pisino

Pazin was built in an area rich in history and inhabited since ancient times. The burg surrounding the castle was inhabited since prehistory. Some of the surrounding rural settlements, such as Glavizza, Beram, which features a necropolis dating from the 7th to 5th century BC, and the castellieri of Bertossi, likewise inhabited since prehistoric times, developed into urban centers, while others became burgs around newly built castles, and others still remained rural villages. Just to its southeast lie Gračišće, castrum Callinianum in Roman times, and Pićan, which was settled by the Histri, and then became a strategically important Roman military settlement under the name Petina. Some historians also link it to Pucinium, an unidentified fortification in central Istria, whose wine was famous even at the Roman court, with Livia, wife of Emperor Augustus, believing that her longevity was due to it. Just to the north of Pazin lies Draguć, formerly part of the County of Pazin as well as the Pazin county, which was a Roman fortification, and where numerous Roman archaeological finds were uncovered. The areas of Pazin, Draguć, Buzet and Roč (an important Roman castrum since the 2nd century BC) are rich in Roman finds.

=== Middle Ages ===
The current settlement of Pazin originated with the houses built around a castle erected by Germanic rulers. These were the houses of the family relatives and feudal settlers, to which were later added those of the foreign artisans, who offered their services to the lords of the castle as well as their employees and subjects. Thus a little burg was born, which was greatly developed when Pazin was enfeoffed to the bishops of Poreč and the town became the capital and center of the County of Pazin. Thus the small burg increased its population, both with commoners and nobles, who embellished it with new buildings, such as the hospice founded by Giovanni Mosconi, then the captain of Pazin.

Pazin was first mentioned as Castrum Pisinum in a 983 deed regarding a donation by Emperor Otto II to the Diocese of Poreč. It then belonged to the Imperial March of Istria, which had originally been under the suzerainty of the newly established Duchy of Carinthia in 976, but separated together with the March of Carniola in 1040.

In the 12th century, Mitterburg Castle was in possession of the Lower Carniolan count Meinhard of Schwarzenburg, who held the office of a vogt of the Poreč bishops (in Latin documents he is known as Cernogradus), and established the Pazin County (earldom). Upon his death, Pazin was inherited by his son-in-law Count Engelbert III of Gorizia (Görz) in 1186.

While most of Istria had gradually been annexed by Venice, Engelbert's descendant Count Albert III of Gorizia in 1374 bequested his Mitterburg estates to the Austrian House of Habsburg, who attached them to their Duchy of Carniola and gave it out in fief to various families, the last of which was the comital House of Montecuccoli from 1766.

=== Turks and brief Venetian rule ===
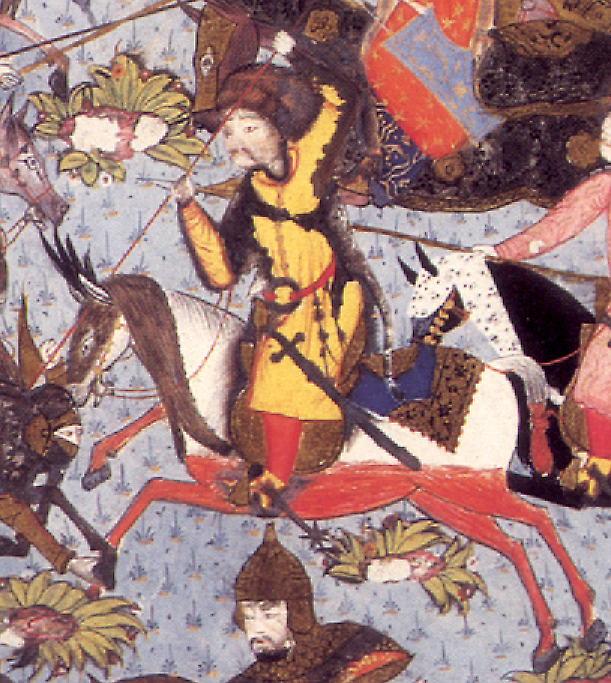
The Turks attacked Pazin on multiple occasions. Upon the 1467 invasion the people of Beram claimed to have killed a whole band of akinji (here depicted in a 16th-century Ottoman miniature)

The Turks invaded Pazin (Pisino) multiple times. In 1467 they struck the heartland of Pazin and Beram (Vermo), with the people of Beram later claiming to have killed a whole band of akindjis (pictured). In 1501 the Turks encamped near a village in the Pazin heartland, and the place where they encamped became known as Monte dei Turchi; indeed, Pazin and the surrounding areas were invaded multiple times by the Turks. These attacks intensified in the 1460s and 1470s. In 1463, Ivan Frankopan devastated Cerovlje and Zarečje before heading to the castle of Pazin. Eventually, however, he did not attack it, heading instead to the less protected Kašćerga and Sovinjak. Both the Turks and the Venetians attacked the town of Draguccio (Draguć), in the Pisinese, and part of the County of Pazin since 1350, and destroyed the settlement around its castle during Austrian times. After the little town passed to Venice, the Uskoks and Austrians gave it the same treatment.

In the 19th century, the place, in the vicinity of Lindar, where the Turks encamped in 1501 was still known as the Monte dei Turchi ("Mount of the Turks"). The last Ottoman incursion in Istria occurred in Pazin in 1511. On this occasion, they destroyed the castle.

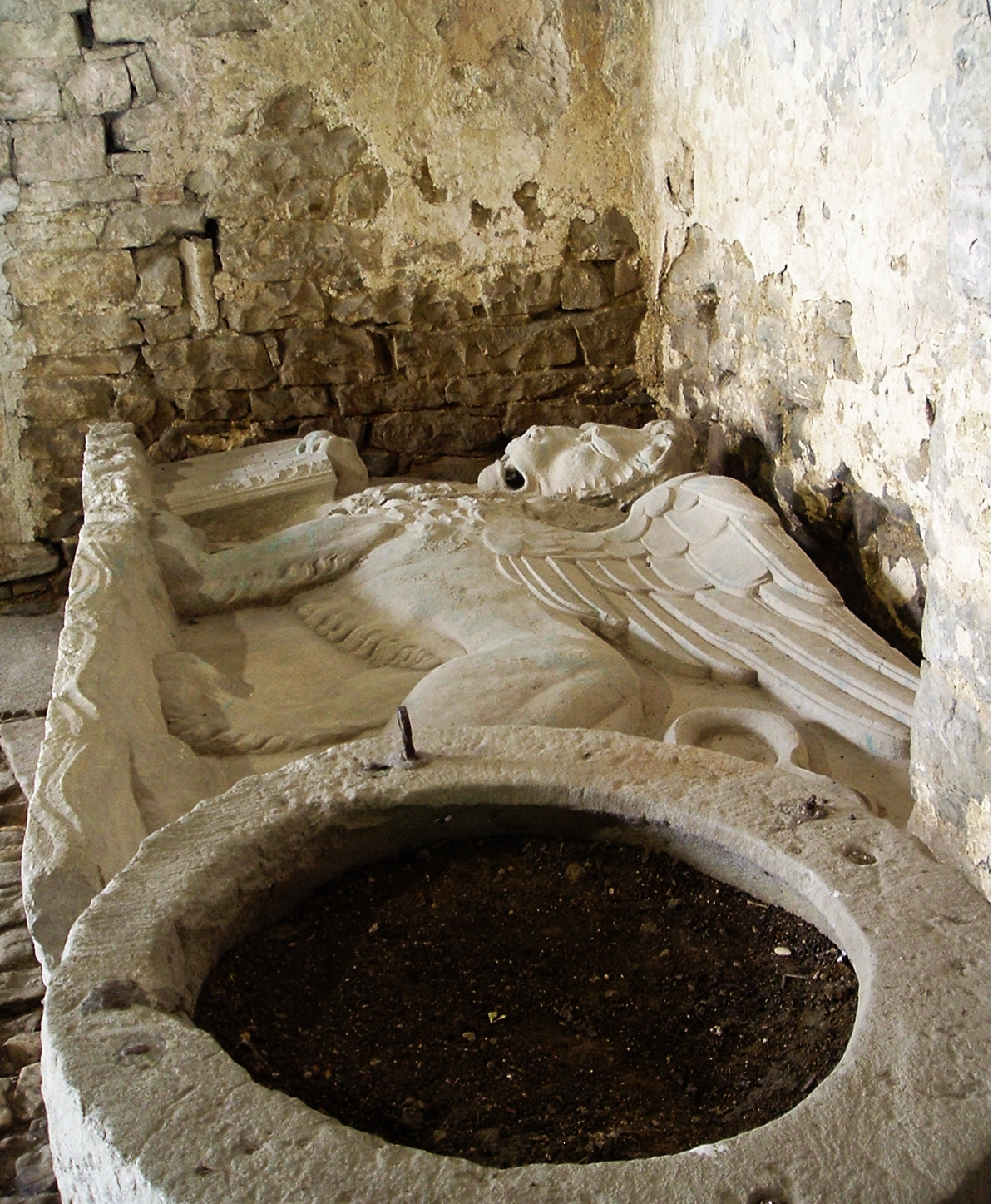
Lion of Saint Mark inside Pazin Castle

In 1508, during the War of the League of Cambrai, the city was conquered by Venetian forces under Bartolomeo d'Alviano, and annexed by the Republic of Venice. It remained under Venetian rule until 1509. During its time under the Serenissima, Francesco Loredan was the castellan of the fortress, while Secondo de Cà Pesaro served in the position of captain of Pazin, as provveditore of the Republic of Venice.

=== Morlach and Slavic settlements ===
In the area surrounding Pazin, there is a very old presence of Croatized Romanians (Vlachs). They are recorded as early as 1102 in Moncalvo di Pisino. Likewise, the presence of Morlachs is reported in Pazin and Old Pazin themselves, and in their countryside. According to Charles Yriarte, by the middle of the 19th century, when he visited it, the term Morlachs was even used by Italians of Pazin to refer to non-Italian people as a whole (i.e. Slavs and actual Morlachs).

In the 16th and 17th centuries, the Austrians brought to the County of Pazin many families of Morlachs, especially after the Treaty of Madrid, which ended the Uskok War.

Slavs inhabited the countryside around Pazin since the 9th century; they worked for the German landowners, who lived in the small fortresses and rocks, built on the edges of the cliffs. The Italians of Pisino trace their origins to the pre-existing Roman community living in the area of the County of Pazin, having resisted the expansion and assimilation of the newcomers. The Italian ethnicity in the County of Pazin was also kept alive and powered by the continuous contact and relationships with the nearby and strictly Italian communities of the Pola and Parenzo (Poreč) areas.

As with the other Istrian counties, the notary and diplomatic language of Pazin remained Latin, in preference to the German language. The Istrian Demarcation (Razvod istarski) was written in 1325 in Croatian and in the Glagolitic script. Beside this debated document, there is only one document written in Croatian, a borders act between Kožljak and Mošćenička Draga, which, however, was written in Croatian to please to chieftains of the Mošćenička Draga area, subjects of the lords of Kastav, who didn't understand Latin. The only official language of the public and private documents of the County of Pazin was Latin, which in the 17th century was replaced by the Italian language. Even the acts and the registers from the captain administration were written in Latin, and then in Italian; German, which was still marginally used up to the 16th century, was used ever less, and finally disappeared in the 17th century.

=== 16th to 18th centuries ===
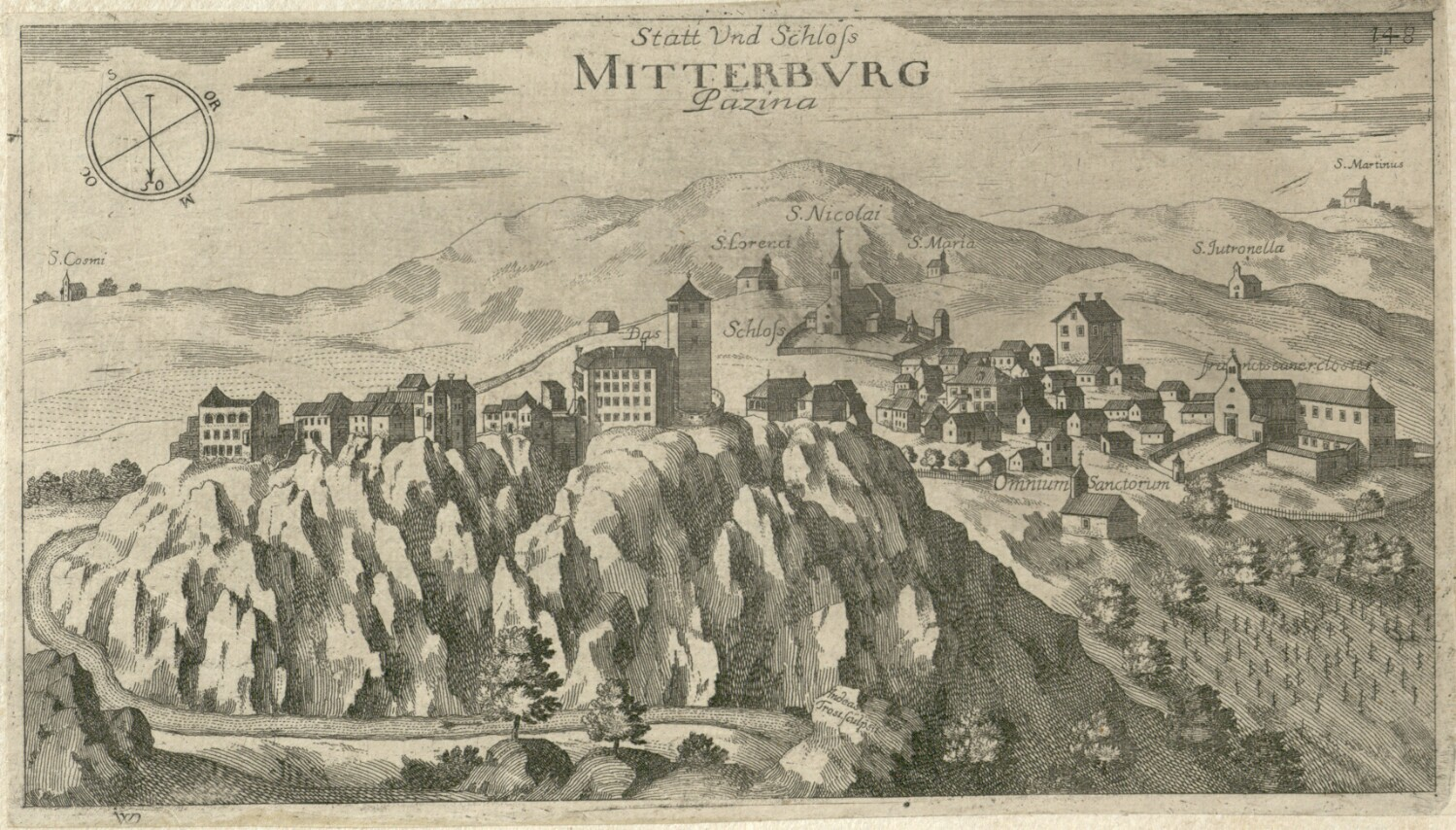
View of Pisino (Pazin) in the 17th century

By 1500, the city of Pazin had a population of around 1500 people. The head of the comune, and elected representative, did not bear the title of zupano (župan), but that of gastaldo. He was elected by the twelve counselors of the so-called Banca, and to operate needed the confirmation, or captain investment. His coadiutori (literally, coadjutors, collaborators) were usually called the giudici rettori. A public notary with Imperial authority acted as chancellor of the comune, stipulating its acts and contracts.

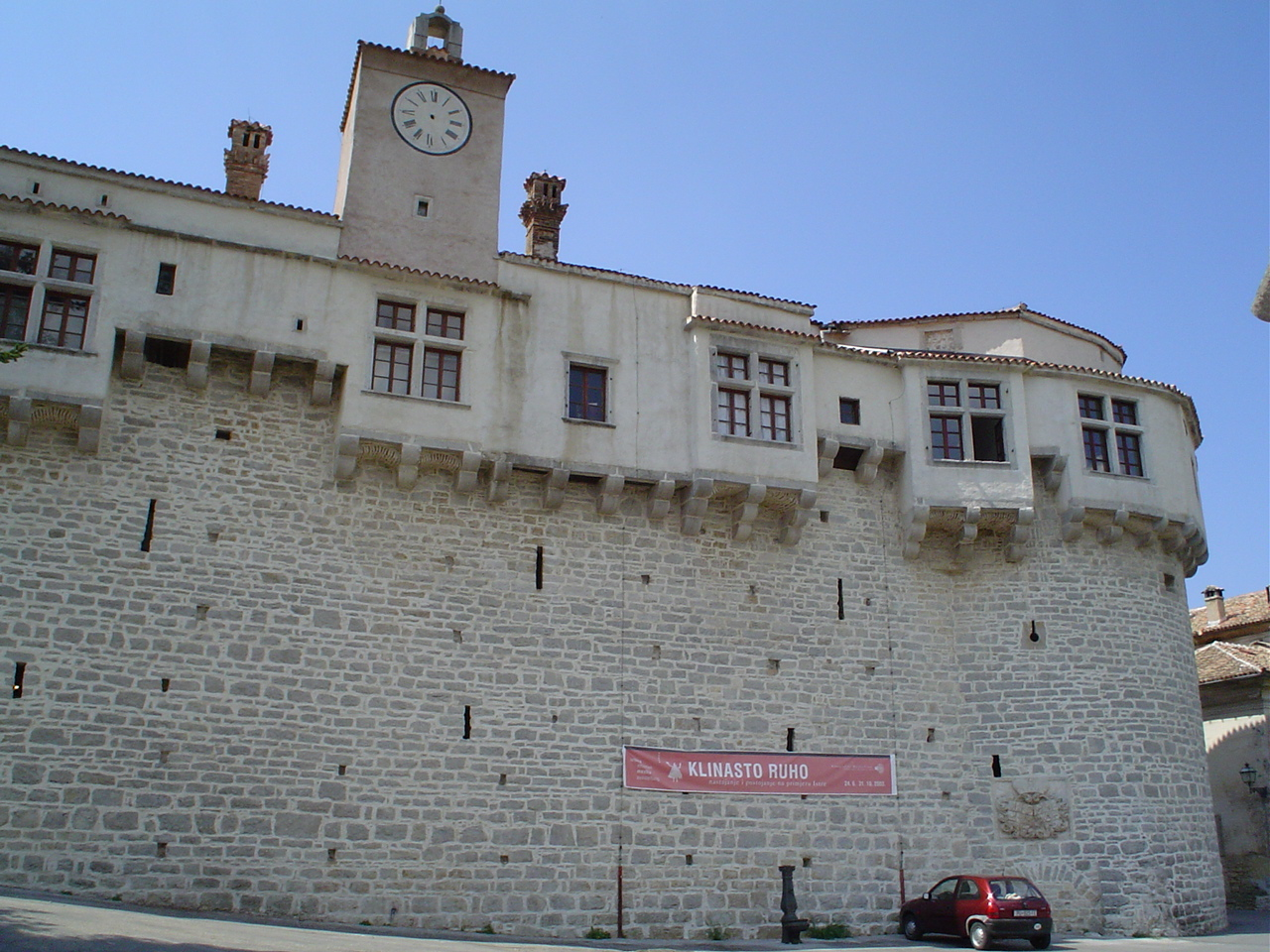
Pazin Castle (Italian: Castle Montecuccoli)

In 1890, through an artificial formation of the comune, the Austrian government was able to make the municipio fall to the Slavs, but the Italians "passionately defended the city on this and other occasions". The Italians kept in Pazin the headquarters of the Società politica istriana ("Istrian Political Society").

=== 20th century ===
Until 1918, the town (under the name Pisino) was part of the Austrian monarchy (Austrian side after the compromise of 1867), seat of the district of the same name, one of the 11 Bezirkshauptmannschaften in the Austrian Littoral province.

In the same year, Pazin and all the Peninsula of Istria were transferred to the Kingdom of Italy. Benito Mussolini, then, introduced a fascist regime in Italy which, under the "Duce", began to Italianize the region. During World War II, the Pazin Decisions were declared, which proclaimed the unification of Istria with Croatia. Most of Istria became part of Yugoslavia after World War II with the Paris Peace Treaties in 1947, and subsequently became part of modern-day Croatia.

== Education ==
Public education was neglected until the 16th century, when some priests started to teach the basics of Latin to the children of the local nobles and the bourgeoisie. Thereafter, the Pazin comune started to hire an Italian tutor (precettore italiano), who had also to serve as the organist of the Church of San Nicolò. The young Pazin students who wanted to pursue their studies in the humanities or philosophy would then move to Trieste or Rijeka, where they would study in the local Jesuit colleges. Those who then wanted to continue with higher studies would often go to Padua.

Between 1646 and 1766, 73 youngsters from the County of Pazin attended the Jesuit college in Trieste, 41 of whom were from Pazin proper. The rector of the Jesuit college of Trieste, Giacomo Rampelli, was himself from Pazin.

In 1836, the first middle school in Pazin was opened. It operated until 1890 when it was moved to Pola (Pula). Teaching in the gymnasium of Pazin was only in the German language. In 1872, the Pazin deputy Francesco Costantini obtained, after long insistence, that also a lower gymnasium with the Italian language would be opened. Slavic parliamentarians of the Diet of Istria bought time until they received assurance that a Croatian gymnasium would also be opened. In 1899, by order of the Austrian government, the first Croatian Gymnasium of Pazin was to be set up, which caused a "manifestation of Italianness" throughout the Julian March. There were manifestations throughout Istria and Trieste, which caused the diet to decree that also the Italian school would be opened in 1899.

The Italian Gymnasium of Pazin prospered, and its initial premises became too small. The consiglio comunale spotted a suitable area for the new building, but the then Austrian appointed podestà, a Croatian, opposed the purchase. The giunta provinciale intervened, voiding the decision of the podestà. The new school was opened in 1902, and before it was completed it was visited by Gabriele D'Annunzio, who was surprised by the Italian population, writing to his friend Francesco Salata:

In Pisino - remember? - on that savage slope, so thick with vigorous and impregnable roots, we see the highest and most effective form of modern intellectual heroism, the struggle for culture, expand throughout a whole people. We feel with a proud and unanimous heartbeat the right of the great, manifold, transfiguring Latin civilization against the barbaric abuse

The Italian gymnasium suffered during World War I, being requisitioned from August 1914 to October of that year. Three of its professors were called to arms, one of whom died on the battlefield. The school was evicted in 1915 and had to resettle in a private house. There were then the first political persecutions, with the arrest of one student and his family and the internment in concentration camp of a professor. It was eventually closed down by the Austrian authorities in 1916. Thirty-tree students of the gymnasium voluntarily participated in the war, four of whom died on the battlefield, and one in prison. In 1918, after the Bersaglieri entered the city, works to reopen the school, now dilapidated, were started.

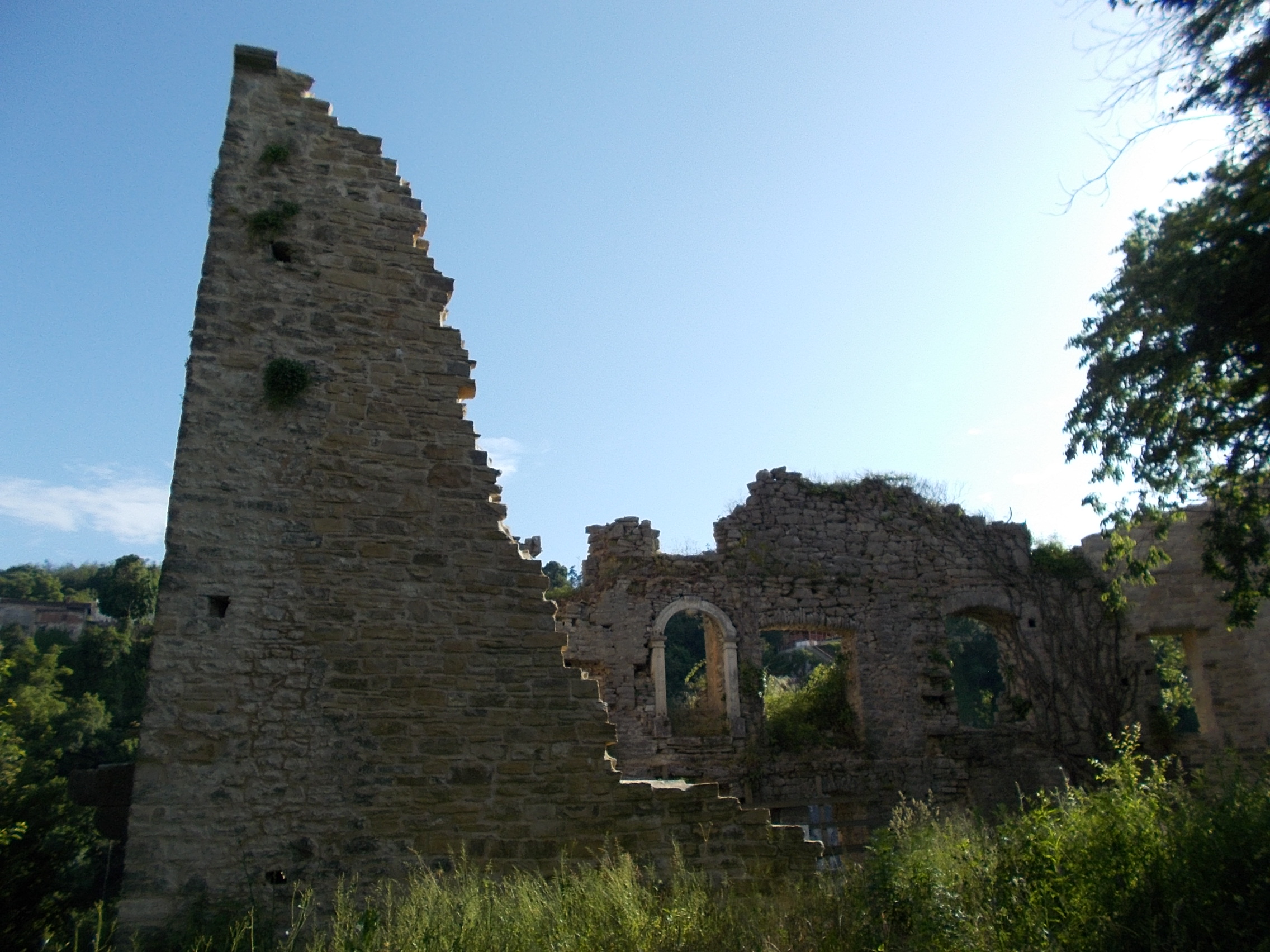
The Rapicio Castle was bombed together with the Italian gymnasium during World War II

It was named after Gian Rinaldo Carli since 1919. The building was further enlarged in 1926 and ten years later the boarding school Fabio Filzi was completed. The school was attended by students from all over Istria, notably Luigi Dallapiccola, Biagio Marin, Pierantonio Quarantotti Gambini, Mario and Licio Visintini, and Dario Leaone, the youngest victim of the foibe massacres. It produced many students who fought for Italy in various wars. It was bombed during World War II, on 4 October 1943, and finally dismantled in 1946, with the demolition of the structure. Its rector Eros Luginbuhl was killed in Split by the partisans, while professor Teresita Bonicelli tragically disappeared. Teacher Norma Cossetto was tortured and infoibed in the foiba of Villa Surani; the principal of the school and rector of the boarding school, Vitale Berardinelli, and professor Antonio Natoli were killed by Yugoslav fleeing forces.

After the Germans reoccupied the city, lessons restarted in the boarding school, which was shared with the German soldiers. The latter eventually evicted the school, which was again relocated to a private house. After the Yugoslav partisans entered the city in May 1945, one of their first actions was evicting the school from that private house. It was then relocated to another house. Pazin was then in ruin, but it was decided to restart the school in the boarding school, which was now inhabited by the Croatian clerics, who opposed this. Thanks to the mediation of Italian bishop Santin, the school was successfully restarted there.

A sanitary commission then visited the school, evicting it again, and themselves leaving the building in deplorable condition when they departed. The Italians cleaned the school and lessons were restarted, but an exhibition of the Croatian civilization was organized there and the school had to be closed again. It was then moved to the infirmary in the back of the boarding school. The school was later allowed to move back to the previous room, where the students had to put up without heating in the winter. In February, the rector Stefani was arrested in his home, brought to Labin and then Opatija, where he miraculously managed to escape. The school was definitively closed in the summer of 1946.

== Sights ==
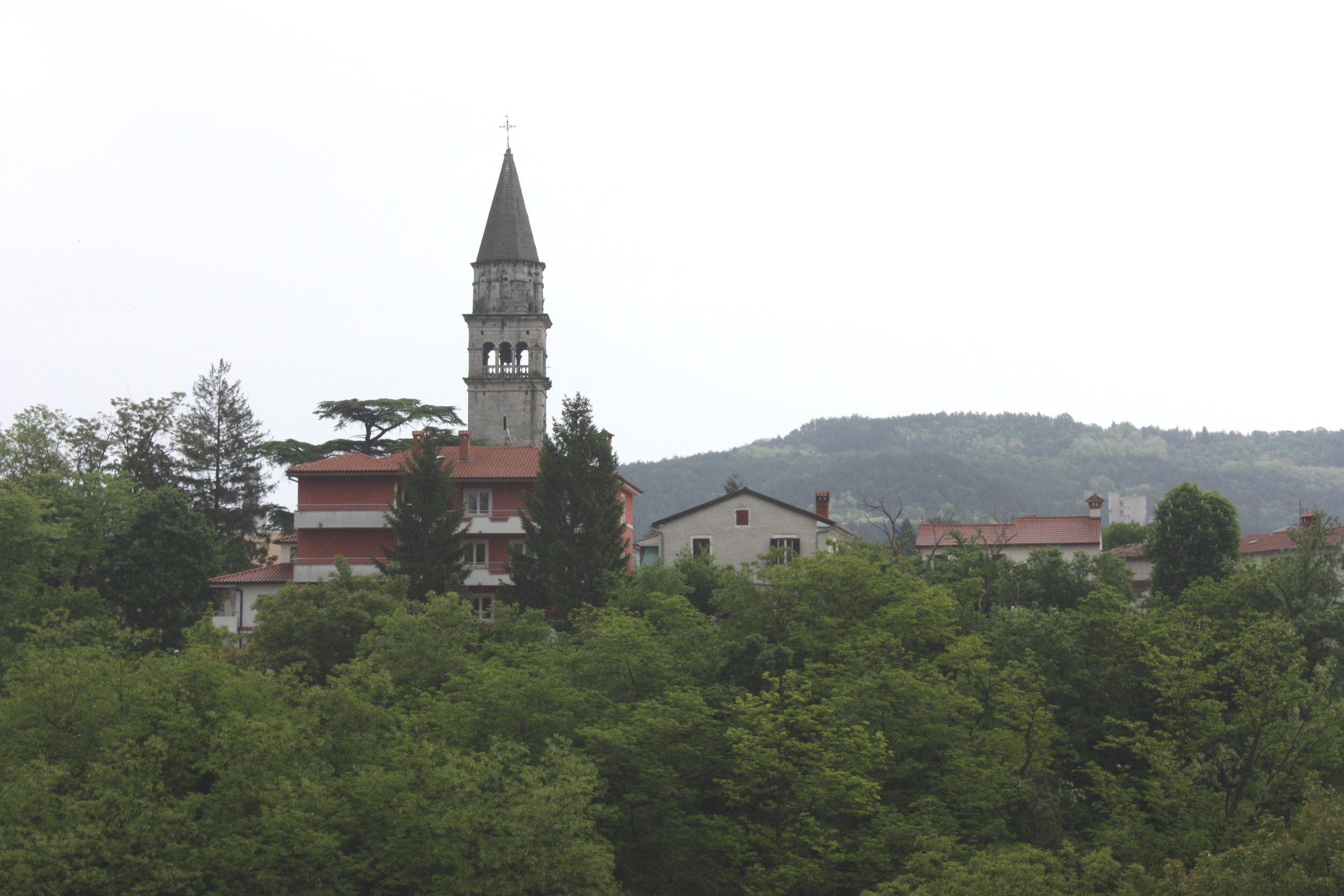
Saint Nicholas' Abbey

The current town was mostly built beneath the medieval fortress. The present-day Pazin Castle was rebuilt in the 15th and 16th century and disassembled in the 18th and 19th. It has been a museum since the end of World War II.

The Pazin ponor (Pazinska jama/Foiba) located under the castle was partially explored by Édouard-Alfred Martel in 1896 and is the best example of karst hydrography and morphology in Istria. Castle and a gorge inspired Jules Verne for the novel Mathias Sandorf of 1885.

Pazin was also home to the Rapicio Castle, built in the 16th century. The Castle was bombed and badly damaged during World War II together with the Italian Gymnasium. Today, its ruins are still visible.

== Demographics ==
According to the 2021 census, its population was 8,279, with 3,981 living in the town proper. At the 2011 census it was 8,638 and 4,386 respectively.

=== Settlements ===
Historical populations of Pazin
Year	Pop.	±%
1880	8,342	—
1890	8,330	−0.1%
1900	9,200	+10.4%
1910	10,317	+12.1%
1921	11,211	+8.7%
1931	10,518	−6.2%
1948	8,685	−17.4%
1953	8,537	−1.7%
1961	8,389	−1.7%
1971	8,158	−2.8%
1981	8,889	+9.0%
1991	9,369	+5.4%
2001	9,227	−1.5%
2011	8,638	−6.4%
Source: Naselja i stanovništvo Republike Hrvatske 1857–2001, DZS, Zagreb, 2005

The town's administrative area consists of 18 settlements with their respective populations:

- Beram/Vermo, 234
- Bertoši/Bertozzi, 325
- Brajkovići/Braicovici, 353
- Butoniga/Bottonega, 74
- Grdoselo/Castelverde di Pisino, 119
- Heki/Checchi, 469
- Ježenj/Ieseni, 141
- Kašćerga/Caschierga, 256
- Kršikla/Chersicla, 48
- Lindar/Lindaro, 402
- Lovrin/Laurini, 364
- Pazin/Pisino, 4,386
- Trviž/Terviso, 409
- Vela Traba/Traba Grande, 227
- Zabrežani/Presani, 426
- Zamask/Zamasco 58
- Zamaski Dol/Valle di Zumesco, 51
- Zarečje/Sarezzo, 296
Town of Pazin: Population trends 1857–2021
v

population	7966	8167	8342	8330	9200	10317	11211	10518	8685	8537	8389	8158	8889	9369	9227	8638	8279
	1857	1869	1880	1890	1900	1910	1921	1931	1948	1953	1961	1971	1981	1991	2001	2011	2021

Sources: Croatian Bureau of Statistics publications

== Notable people ==
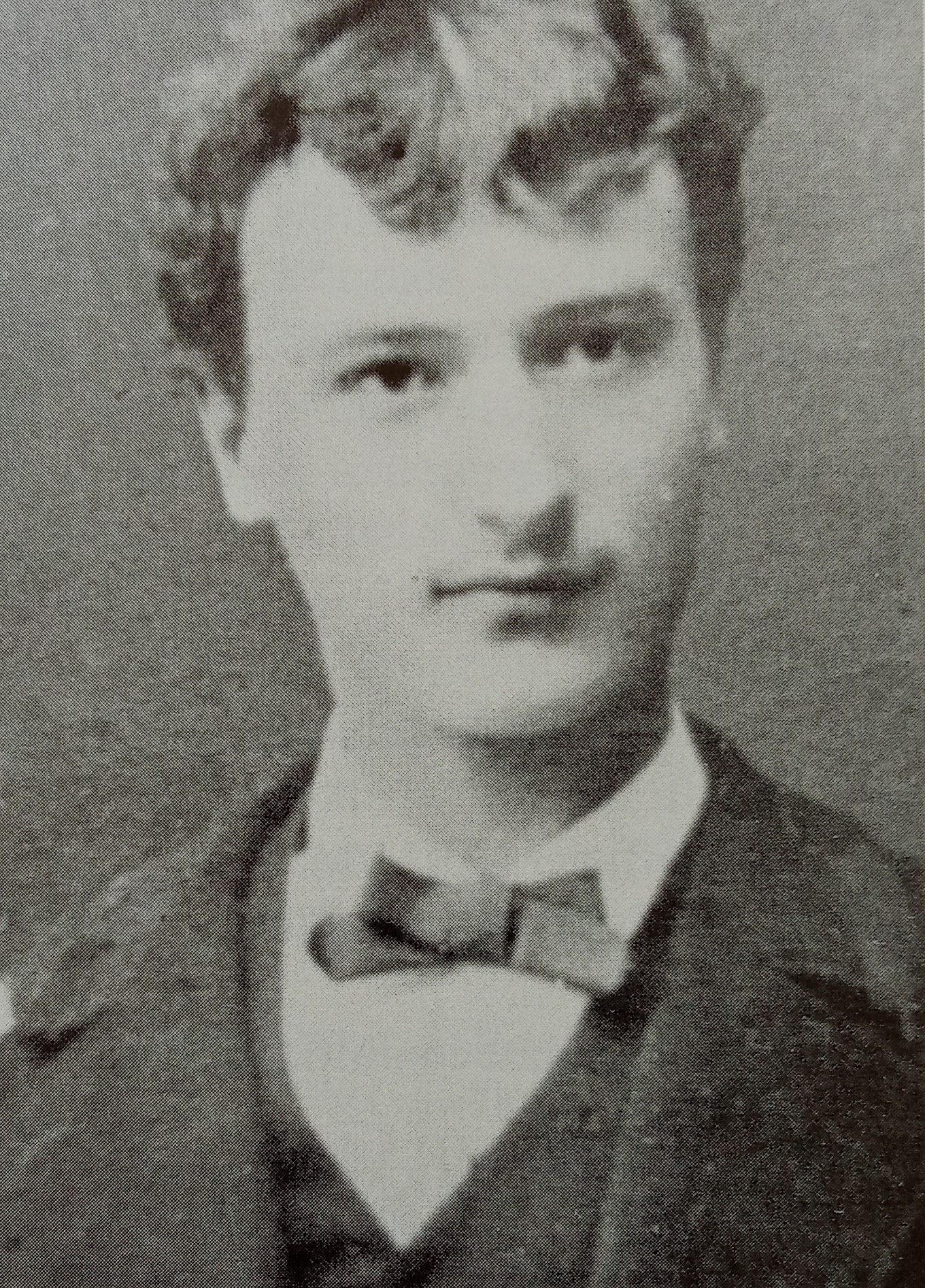
Paul Stupar

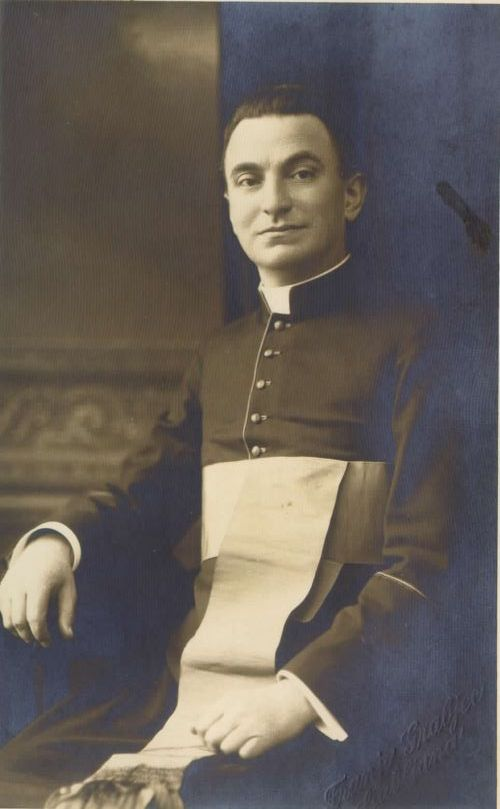
Josip Ujčić

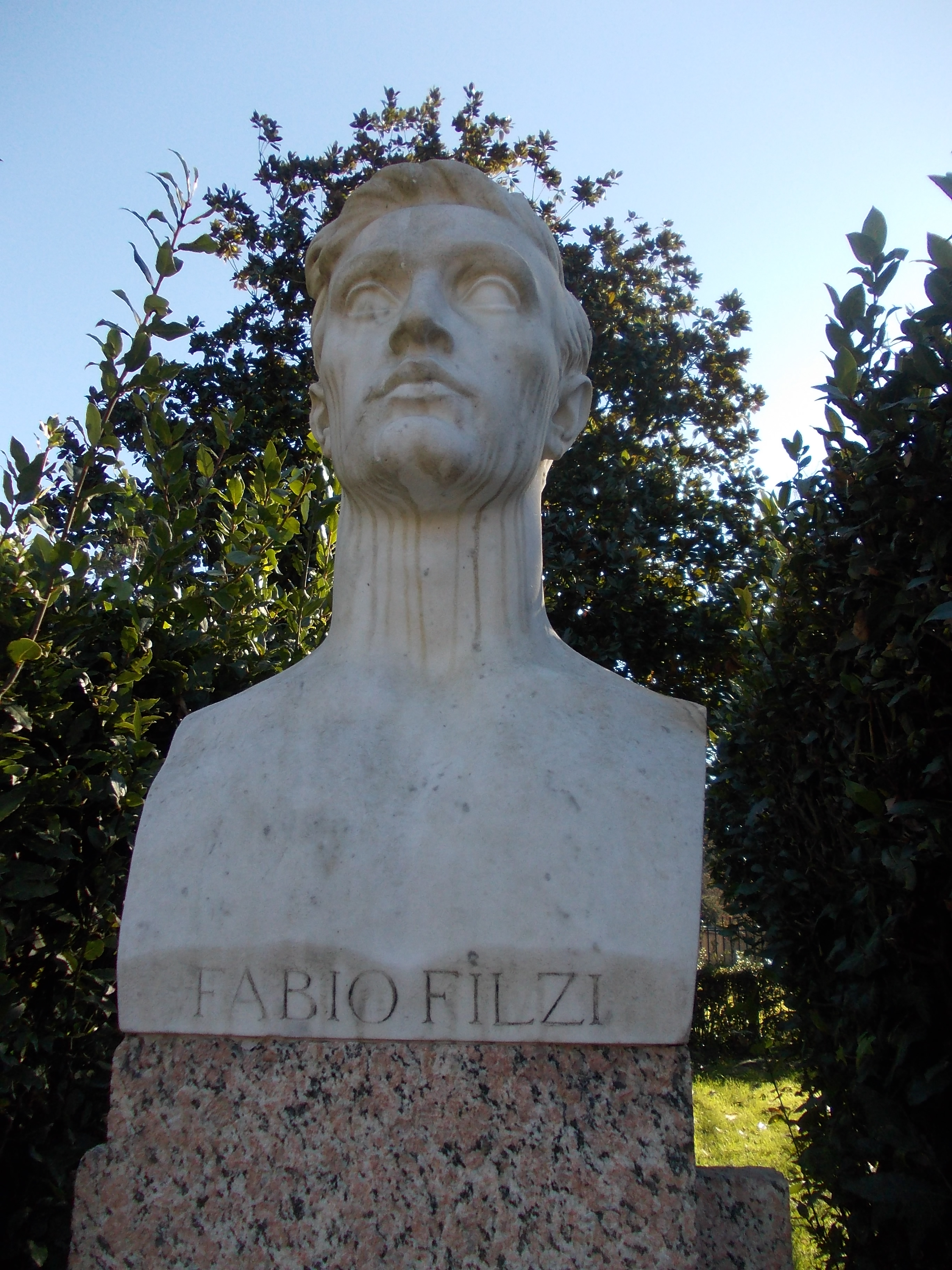
Fabio Filzi

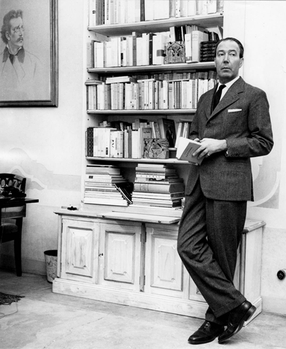
Pier Antonio Quarantotti Gambini

- Leonard Bagni (1593–1650), priest and theologian
- Stojan Brajša (1888–1989), politician, lawyer and publicist
- Dražen Bratulić (born 1971), actor
- Renato Camus (1891–1971), architect
- Antonio Chinappi (fl. 1710s), Doctor of Law
- Francesco Costantini (1827–1899), lawyer, politician, mayor of Pazin (1880–1883)
- Attilio Craglietto (1884–1966), educator, politician
- Luigi Dallapiccola (1904–1975), composer
- Gino De Finetti (1877–1955), painter
- Carlo De Franceschi (1809–1893), historian and politician
- Juraj Dobrila (1812–1882), prelate, Bishop of Trieste
- Fabio Filzi (1884–1916), Italian patriot
- Pier Antonio Quarantotti Gambini (1910–1965), poet and writer
- Tullio Ghersetich (1930–2020), football player, played for Empoli, Fiorentina and Cagliari
- Pasqualino Gobbi (17th century), writer, Doctor of Law, Archdeacon of Pola
- Vinko Jelovac (born 1948), international basketball player
- Antun Kalac (1849–1919), poet, writer, priest
- Guglielmo Legler (1875–1951), painter, married in 1900 to Grete Schindler (sister of Alma Mahler) (Note: Please, do notice that the mentioned Legler was the son of Wilhelm Legler junior (1875–1951) and Margaretha Julie (Grete) Schindler (1880–1943). Wilhelm Karl Emil Legler was born 1902 in Stuttgart and died in Vienna 1960. He is named after the painters Karl Moll (1861–1945) and his grandfather Emil J. Schindler (1842–1892) and was by profession an architect.)
- Ivan Matijašić (1916–2001), surgeon
- Ilda Mizzan (died 1922), irredentist, wife of Francesco Salata
- Igor Pamić (born 1969), footballer
- Cristoforo Rampelli (17th century), jurist, captain of Pazin 1674–1686
- Andrea Rapicio (1533–1573), jurist and prelate, Bishop of Trieste
- Paul Stupar (1866–1928), naval officer, rear admiral
- Radojka Šverko (born 1948), singer
- Janetto de Tassis (1450–1518), postmaster and courier
- Ettore Uicich (1870–1915), irredentist, war volunteer
- Josip Ujčić (1880–1964), prelate, Archbishop of Belgrade
- Milan Zgrablić (born 1960), prelate

=== Origin from Pazin ===
- Margherita Granbassi (born 1979), fencer
- Ezio Mizzan (1905–1969), diplomat

== Climate ==
Climate in this area has high diurnal variations, and there is adequate rainfall year-round. The Köppen Climate Classification subtype for this climate is "Cfb". (Marine West Coast Climate).

Climate data for Pazin (1971–2000, extremes 1961–2021)
Month	Jan	Feb	Mar	Apr	May	Jun	Jul	Aug	Sep	Oct	Nov	Dec	Year
Record high °C (°F)	21.4 (70.5)	23.6 (74.5)	26.5 (79.7)	28.8 (83.8)	33.7 (92.7)	35.6 (96.1)	38.6 (101.5)	39.5 (103.1)	34.8 (94.6)	28.8 (83.8)	25.2 (77.4)	21.6 (70.9)	38.7 (101.7)
Mean daily maximum °C (°F)	8.7 (47.7)	10.0 (50.0)	13.0 (55.4)	16.2 (61.2)	21.6 (70.9)	25.1 (77.2)	28.4 (83.1)	28.5 (83.3)	23.9 (75.0)	18.7 (65.7)	12.9 (55.2)	9.5 (49.1)	18.0 (64.4)
Daily mean °C (°F)	3.0 (37.4)	3.5 (38.3)	6.4 (43.5)	9.9 (49.8)	14.8 (58.6)	18.3 (64.9)	20.8 (69.4)	20.2 (68.4)	16.0 (60.8)	11.7 (53.1)	6.9 (44.4)	3.9 (39.0)	11.3 (52.3)
Mean daily minimum °C (°F)	−1.9 (28.6)	−2.1 (28.2)	0.5 (32.9)	3.9 (39.0)	8.1 (46.6)	11.4 (52.5)	13.3 (55.9)	12.9 (55.2)	9.6 (49.3)	6.1 (43.0)	1.9 (35.4)	−0.9 (30.4)	5.2 (41.4)
Record low °C (°F)	−18.7 (−1.7)	−15.9 (3.4)	−14.0 (6.8)	−7.8 (18.0)	−2.5 (27.5)	1.7 (35.1)	5.2 (41.4)	3.5 (38.3)	−2.0 (28.4)	−5.6 (21.9)	−10.5 (13.1)	−15.5 (4.1)	−18.7 (−1.7)
Average precipitation mm (inches)	74.7 (2.94)	66.9 (2.63)	78.8 (3.10)	91.7 (3.61)	79.1 (3.11)	92.7 (3.65)	65.0 (2.56)	94.9 (3.74)	102.8 (4.05)	123.5 (4.86)	123.7 (4.87)	92.6 (3.65)	1,066.4 (41.98)
Average precipitation days (≥ 0.1 mm)	10.0	8.1	9.4	13.1	11.9	12.1	8.5	9.1	9.6	10.9	11.2	10.4	124.2
Average snowy days (≥ 1.0 cm)	1.5	0.9	0.5	0.0	0.0	0.0	0.0	0.0	0.0	0.0	0.1	0.5	3.6
Average relative humidity (%)	78.6	73.0	70.8	71.4	72.1	71.9	68.4	70.6	76.6	78.6	79.4	79.3	74.2
Mean monthly sunshine hours	86.8	118.7	142.6	165.0	210.8	222.0	275.9	266.6	207.0	151.9	90.0	74.4	2,011.7
Source: Croatian Meteorological and Hydrological Service
