= Costantino Costantini (architect) =

Italian architect

- Born: 11 August 1904; Oneglia, Italy
- Died: 9 June 1982 (aged 77); Milan, Italy
- Occupation: Architect

Costantino Costantini (11 August 1904 – 9 June 1982) was an Italian architect. His work was part of the architecture event in the art competition at the 1936 Summer Olympics.
