= Lindar, Croatia =

Settlement in Istria County, Croatia

Lindar Lindaro
- Settlement
- Interactive map of Lindar
- Location of Lindar in Croatia
- Coordinates: 45°14′02″N 13°57′47″E
- Country: Croatia
- County: Istria County
- City: Pazin

Area
  - Total: 10.0 km^{2} (3.9 sq mi)

Population (2021)
  - Total: 410
  - Density: 41/km^{2} (110/sq mi)
- Time zone: UTC+1 (CET)
  - Summer (DST): UTC+2 (CEST)
- Postal code: 52000 Pazin
- Area code: +385 (0)52

Lindar (Italian: Lindaro) is a settlement in the City of Pazin, Istria in Croatia. In 2021, its population was 410.

== Demographics ==
Lindar: Population trends 1857–2021
v

population	1095	1132	673	634	659	647	1169	1192	569	549	450	366	319	369	408	402	410
	1857	1869	1880	1890	1900	1910	1921	1931	1948	1953	1961	1971	1981	1991	2001	2011	2021

Sources: Croatian Bureau of Statistics publications
