= Società politica istriana =

Istrian Political Society Società politica istriana
- Abbreviation: SPI
- Founder: Francesco Costantini
- Founded: 1884
- Dissolved: 1915
- Headquarters: Pisino (Pazin)
- Ideology: Liberalism

The Società politica istriana ("Istrian Political Society") was an Italian political party founded in 1884 by Francesco Costantini in Pisino (now Pazin, Croatia), which was at the time part of the Austrian Empire. It was also known as Partito liberazionale.

== History ==
It was founded by Francesco Costantini, as the output of the Italian political forces in Istria, especially the liberal party. Costantini was also its first president. Its political agenda was centered on the defense and diffusion of Italianità in Istria.

In 1905 it reached an agreement with the Political Society for Croats and Slovenes in Istria on the division of constituencies. The two parties hardly managed to cooperate. The party was broken down by the Austrian government in 1915.
