= Oberdan (disambiguation) =

Oberdan is the 1932 book by Italian author and historian Francesco Salata. It may also refer to:

- Oberdan (name), list of people with the name
- Lungotevere Guglielmo Oberdan, stretch of the Lungotevere boulevard in Rome, Italy
