= Il patto Mussolini =

1933 history book by Francesco Salata

- Cover of the 1933 edition
- Author: Francesco Salata
- Language: Italian
- Genre: History book, essay
- Publisher: Mondadori
- Publication date: 1933
- Publication place: Italy
- Pages: 356

Il patto Mussolini (lit. '"The Mussolini Pact"'), in full: Il patto Mussolini: storia di un piano politico e di un negoziato diplomatico, is a history book by Italian author and historian Francesco Salata, first published in 1933. The book is a "history and analysis of the Four Power Pact, with all the documents," and a "eulogy when praising Mussolini's accomplishments as a diplomat." Apart from the "too much dithyrambic tone," Salata's work is considered fundamental and a "very valuable exegesis."

== Overview ==
The book was published by Mondadori in 1933, one year after the success of Oberdan, the reduced version of Salata's Guglielmo Oberdan secondo gli atti segreti del processo: carteggi diplomatici e altri documenti inediti, originally published by Zanichelli in 1924. Salata had proposed the work to Mondadori which, beside having an interest in publishing books potentially appealing to the public, was not new to pleasing personalities close to the regime, which indeed backed the publishing of this work.

Il patto Mussolini, sometimes credited as Salata's greatest commercial success, is an analysis and history of the Four Power Pact, a non-belligerence treaty that was initialed in June 1933 in the Palazzo Venezia in Rome by France, the United Kingdom, Germany, and Italy. In the book, "Salata, an expert of history studies, as part of a book of diplomatic review," highly praises Mussolini and his accomplishments as a diplomat.

In the book Salata provides a genesis and background of the pact, ending with Mussolini's speech, followed by all the documents and texts (including the superseded drafts of the pact). He remarks on the quality of the speech of Mussolini, according to him the best ever given by an Italian head of state, as well as the greatest interpretation of the feelings of other populations and of the universality ever made by a head of state. (Note: One Italian diplomat claimed: "In all my political career I have never listened to such a perfect government speech". Another remarked: "If such a speech, so balanced and - let me say with some professional pride - diplomatic in the high sense of the word had been pronounced at the beginning of the century by Visconti-Venosta, everybody would have said: 'See, you need forty years of diplomatic experience to come up with such a speech'". Salata likewise regarded it as the greatest speech ever given by an Italian head of state or minister and the best interpretation of the feelings of other populations and of the universality ever pronounced, and even linked Mussolini, and Fascist Italy, to Garibaldi and Cavour, through a little-known letter from the Italian revolutionary to Cavour, in which Garibaldi pleads to the Count: "I am with you in cherishing alliances [...], but, sir Count, you need to be arbitrator in Europe and behave at least in the same way with those who want to boss around [...] Italy today represents the aspirations of the nationalities of the world, and you rule Italy! [...] Then, I beg you to believe me, sir Count: Italy and he who rules it must have friends everywhere, but fear no one." According to Salata, the European mission of Italy and its "Duce" of those remote days "echoes as a foretelling of that fusion and harmony which in Mussolini have so happily united Revolution and Diplomacy". The presage addressed by Garibaldi to the dying Cavour - a presage which, according to Salata, would be of primacy, and not of domination - had to "shine in the light of reality to the Italy renewed by Fascism" after "many decades of obscurity".)

Notwithstanding the perhaps excessive celebration of Mussolini, the work is considered fundamental, and an important exegesis.

== Reception ==
Though an "instant book", the work is credited as Francesco Salata's biggest commercial success. William L. Langer described it as a "history and analysis of the Four Power Pact, with all the documents". Muriel Currey, writing a review of the work for International Affairs, praised its "clear and vivacious" narrative chapters, "illuminating information", and detailed documentation, calling it a "remarkable and invaluable book". Konrad Jarausch, who wrote one of the most important works on the Four Power Pact along with Salata's Il patto Mussolini itself, remarked that "Salata goes too far in praising Mussolini's accomplishments as a diplomat".
