= Catherine Wihtol de Wenden =

French political scientist

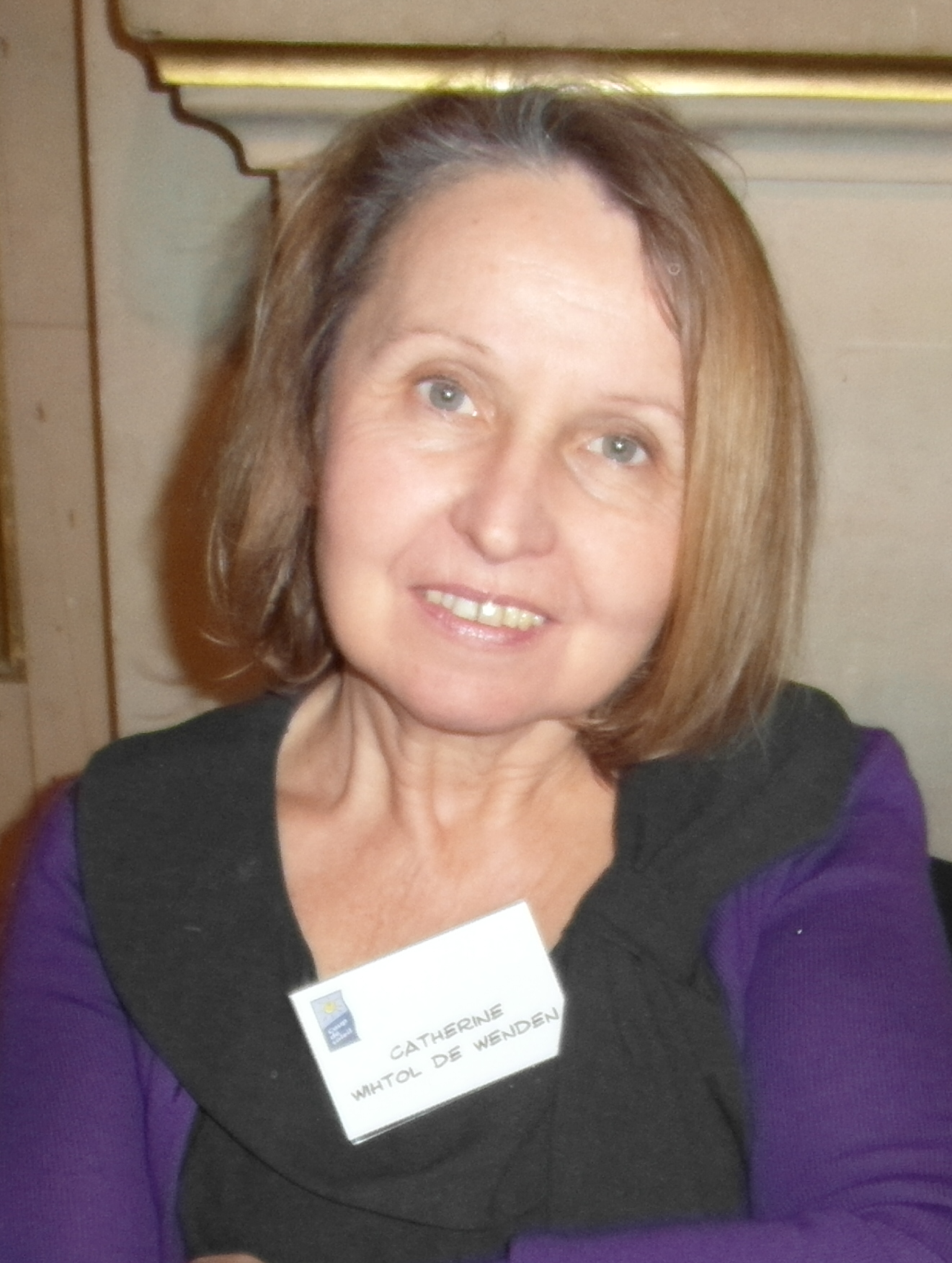
- Wihtol de Wenden in 2015
- Education: Institute for International Political Studies
- Awards: Officier, Legion of Honor; Médaille d'honneur, CNRS
- Scientific career
- Fields: Political science
- Workplaces: French National Centre for Scientific Research; Institute for International Political Studies

Catherine Wihtol de Wenden (born 6 June 1950) is a French political scientist. She is the Research Director at the French National Centre for Scientific Research and a senior researcher at the Institute for International Political Studies. Wihtol de Wenden specializes in migration studies. She is also an activist for the right to immigration in France.

== Career ==
Wihtol de Wenden earned a PhD from the Institut d'études politiques de Paris in 1986. She then joined the political science faculty of the French National Centre for Scientific Research, where she later became Research Director. She is also a senior researcher at the Institute for International Political Studies.

Wihtol de Wenden has been a consultant to the OECD, the Council of Europe, and the European Commission as well as an external expert to the United Nations High Commissioner for Refugees. She was also a member of the French National Commission on Security Ethics (fr) from 2003 to 2011.

In 2014, she was named a Chevalier of the Legion of Honor. In 2018, she was promoted to the rank of Officier. She also won the médaille d'honneur from the French National Centre for Scientific Research in 2017.

Wihtol has been vocal in the French media in support of loosening restrictions on migration to France.

== Selected works ==
- Citoyenneté, nationalité et immigration, Arcantère, 1987
- Les immigrés et la politique. Cent-cinquante ans d'évolution, Presses de la FNSP, 1988
- Les étrangers dans la cité. Expériences européennes, with Olivier Le Cour Grandmaison, La Découverte, 1993
- La bourgeoisie. Les trois âges de la vie associative issue de l'immigration, with R. Leveau, CNRS Ed., 2001. (pocket edition 2007, ISBN 978-2271065964)
- Atlas des migrations: Un équilibre mondial à inventer, 2012, ISBN 978-2746730816.
- Pour accompagner les migrations en Méditerranée, L'Harmattan, 2013, ISBN 978-2-343-01077-9
- L'Immigration. Découvrir l'histoire, les évolutions et les tendances des phénomènes migratoires, Eyrolles, 2016, ISBN 978-2-212-56472-3

== Selected awards ==
- Officier, Legion of Honor
- Médaille d'honneur, French National Centre for Scientific Research
