= Ilda Mizzan =

Italian artist

- Born: 1885; Pisino, Istria, Austria-Hungary
- Died: June 1922 (aged 37); Rome, Kingdom of Italy
- Spouse: Francesco Salata (m. 1903)

Ilda Mizzan (1885 – June 1922) was an Italian irredentist and painter, best known for being interned at the hands of the Austrians during World War I and her consequential death, as well as for being the wife of Italian historian Francesco Salata.

During World War I, Mizzan was apprehended and interned by the Austrians, along with her young daughter, due to the anti-Austrian activities of her husband and fellow irredentist Francesco Salata. During her captivity she contracted tuberculosis and died of it a few years after the end of the war.

== Biography ==
Ilda Mizzan was born in 1885 in Pisino, Istria, the daughter of a wealthy Triestine pharmacist. In 1902, Gabriele D'Annunzio visited Pisino, entering the city under a "pouring of flowers", let down by the population from the windows of the crowded houses, along with colored pieces of paper on which had been written wishes to the poet as well as the titles of his best-known books. As D'Annunzio expressed in a letter to his friend Francesco Salata, he was impressed by the civility of the Italian population living there. In Pisino, a homage, designed by Mizzan, was paid to D'Annunzio, and a banquet was offered to him. On this occasion, he became acquainted to Mizzan who, years later, would marry D'Annunzio's friend, historian and future senator Francesco Salata. The canteen in which the banquet was held was adorned with "tricolore flowers beautifully painted by Ilda Mizzan". D'Annunzio gave to Mizzan a copy of his Francesca da Rimini, dedicating it to her.

On 9 September 1903, she celebrated her marriage to Salata, who was 9 years her senior, and would be his companion throughout his "irredentist period". She and Salata then moved together to Parenzo. After their move to the coastal town, their daughter, Maria, was born in 1911.

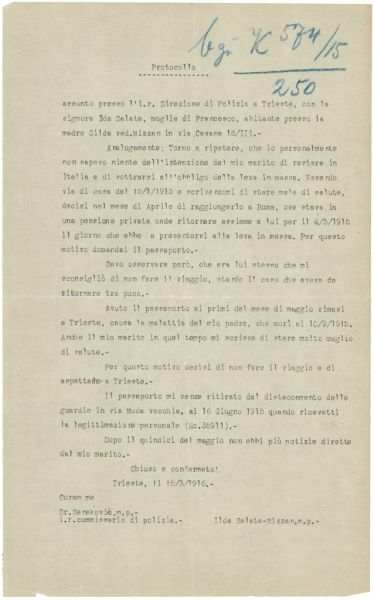
Protocol of the interrogation of Ilda Mizzan from the Austrian Police Directorate of Trieste, March 1916

At the beginning of 1915, already into World War I but before Italy's entry in the conflict, her husband was sent to Rome thanks to an Austro-Hungarian mandate for the importation to Istria of extra provisions. He then decided to stay there, to fight for Italy's entry into the war, which would indeed occur a few months later. In the correspondence between Mizzan and Salata from the beginning of 1915 to Italy's entry into the war, it can be perceived, behind the rigidity of war censorship (which forced them to discuss only ordinary, day-to-day arguments), the growing consciousness in Mizzan that her husband would not return home.

Salata actively contributed to the Italian cause. He prepared documentation to support Italy's claims in the Adriatic. In May 1915 he even anonymously published the book Il diritto d'Italia su Trieste e l'Istria: documenti ("The Right of Italy on Trieste and Istria - Documents"), in support of Italian rights on Istria and Trieste. He worked for Italy both as an historian of the contested regions as well as a direct administrator in times of war. Within a month after the outbreak of the conflict, he was employed by the General Secretariat for Civil Affairs (Italian: Segretariato generale per gli affari civili) at the Army supreme command in war zone (Italian: Comando supremo dell'esercito in zona di guerra), initially as head of the administrative office, going on to become deputy secretary general by the end of the conflict.

The Austrian authorities then decided to take revenge on Mizzan and their young daughter, who had remained on Austrian territory, in Ossero (Salata's birthplace). They, along with Salata's family, were interned in Mittergraben near Oberhollabrunn. Mizzan and her daughter remained interned for more than one year, from 1916 to 1917. During this period, she contracted tuberculosis.

After the war she spent long periods between hospitals and rest homes, and eventually died of the disease contracted during her internment, in 1922, aged 37.

== See also ==
- Maria Hardouin
- Oberdan
