= Francesco Salata =

Dalmatian Italian politician (1876–1944)

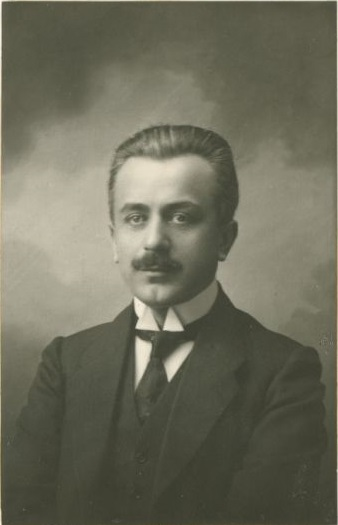

Senator of the Kingdom of Italy
- In office 4 December 1920 – 5 August 1943

Ambassador of Italy to Austria
- In office 7 August 1936 – 27 October 1937

Personal details
- Born: 17 September 1876 Ossero, Austria-Hungary
- Died: 10 March 1944 (aged 67) Rome, Kingdom of Italy
- Spouse: Ilda Mizzan
- Children: 1
- Awards: Commander of the Order of the Crown; Grand Officer of the Order of the Crown; Commander of the Order of Saints Maurice and Lazarus; Knight Grand Cross of the Order of the Crown; Grand Officer of the Order of Saints Maurice and Lazarus

Francesco Salata (17 September 1876 – 10 March 1944) was a Dalmatian Italian senator, politician, journalist, historian and writer. Salata was an irredentist, although he had a more legalistic approach than other contemporaries, as well as being more liberal. He initially came into conflict with Mussolini's fascists, though he ultimately aligned himself with the regime, and was employed by the fascist government, writing books apologizing for the fascist politics. Celso Costantini described him as "a Fascist, but also a gentleman". Very fond of his native Dalmatia, Salata strenuously fought for Italy's annexation of its "unredeemed lands", during and after World War I, participating in the negotiations that led to the Treaty of Rapallo. Salata upheld the idea that Dalmatia, Istria and the Kvarner were, historically, Italian lands.

A radical by imperial standards but a moderate in post World War I Italy, Salata gradually endorsed Mussolini, becoming one of the Italian regime's most prominent ideologists by the late 1920s. His influence drastically declined in 1937, when Mussolini dismissed him from his role as intermediary between Italy and Austria in Vienna, and from his post as Italian Ambassador to Austria, recalling him to Italy.

One of the founding members of the Italian Encyclopedia, he wrote numerous history books, with the best-known being Guglielmo Oberdan secondo gli atti segreti del processo: carteggi diplomatici e altri documenti inediti (1924), republished in a reduced version titled Oberdan in 1932, Il patto Mussolini: storia di un piano politico e di un negoziato diplomatico (1933), and Il nodo di Gibuti: storia diplomatica su documenti inediti (1939).

== Biography ==
=== Early life ===
Salata was born on 17 September 1876 in Ossero (present-day Osor, Croatia), on the island of Cres, which at the time was part of the Austro-hungarian empire. His family wasn't hereditary aristocratic but nonetheless was well-to-do. His father was podestà of Osor from 1883 until 1901.

In 1911 Salata married Ilda Mizzan, from a Pisino (present-day Pazin, Croatia) family. They had a daughter together, Maria, born in 1911. Salata befriended and toured Istria with Gabriele D'Annunzio, who met his wife—years before her marriage to Salata—in her hometown of Pisino, during the same tour, where she designed a tribute paid to the poet upon his entry in the Istrian town, with D'Annunzio dedicating to her a copy of his Francesca da Rimini.

As early as in his high school years, Salata risked to be expelled from all the schools of the empire because of his attempts to found a branch of the Lega Nazionale in Osor, which promoted the Italian language and culture in territories inhabited also by Germans, Croatians and Slovenians, that is Trentino and the Adriatic coast.

After attending high school in Koper (Capodistria), Salata studied law at the University of Vienna (a total of seven semesters). He also studied two semesters at the University of Graz. Salata interrupted his universitary studies to dedicate himself first to journalism and then to his studies on history. In 1888 he was the editor of Pula's (Pola) Il popolo istriano, and later a collaborator of Trieste's Il Piccolo.

=== Prewar irredentism ===
Salata participated in conferences of the Italian society of archaeology in Istria (Società istriana di archeologia e storia patria). His first intervention was on his fellow townsman Francesco Patrizi. With his works L’antica diocesi di Ossero e la liturgia slava: pagine di storia patria ("The Ancient Diocese of Osor and the Slavic Liturgy: Pages of National History", 1897) and Nuovi studi sulla liturgia slava ("New Studies on Slavic Liturgy", 1897), he joined the debate against the usage of the modern Slavic languages in the Catholic churches of Istria and the Kvarner which, according to Salata and the other critics, was promoted by exploiting Old Church Slavonic liturgy. Both works end with an attack on the Slovenian and Croatian clergy. His subsequent works are increasingly patriotic, being "characterized by philological attention to documents combined with political suggestions of patriotic inspiration".

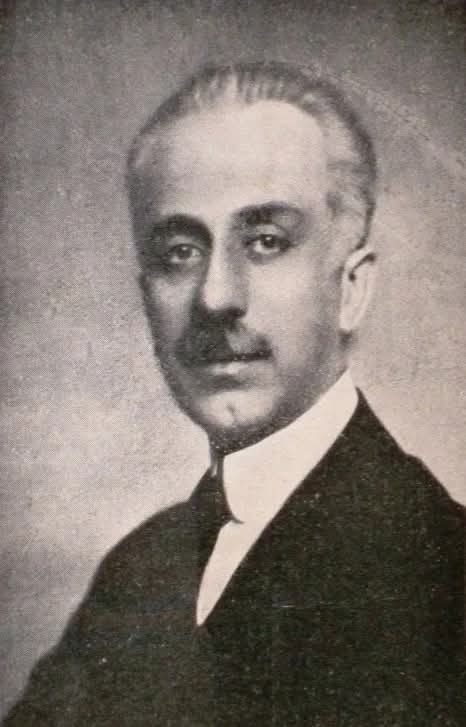
Salata in 1920

Salata later joined the Società politica istriana (SPI). He believed in the civic and cultural superiority of the Italian element, and used this notion to justify the entitlement of Italians to govern the res publica. According to Salata, this "preeminence" conformed to the "Austrian law of political representation of classes and interests," and it derived from the important number of Italians in modern-day Croatian lands and their "civic value and contributive force." According to Salata, Italians were superior "in ownership, intelligence and venerable culture." Salata became secretary and vice-president of the SPI in 1903. The party promoted Italian culture in Istria, fighting for positions of control in the local administrations. It also fought for the consolidation of the use of the Italian language at an administrative level and in schools. Salata was elected to the Diet of Istria in 1908.

=== First World War ===
He went to Rome for administrative reasons at the beginning of 1915, just a few months before the outbreak of World War I. Salata then decided to remain in Rome, in order to plead his cause for Italy's intervention in the war. There, he came into contact with the central commission for the Trentine and Adriatic refugees (Commissione centrale di patronato dei fuoriusciti trentini e adriatici), and started to prepare material to support Italy's claim on Italian irredent Adriatic lands. In May 1915 he published anonymously Il diritto d'Italia su Trieste e l'Istria: documenti ("Italy's Right on Trieste and Istria: Documents"), in which he claimed that Italy had the "right and duty to the integration of its national unity and Adriatic dominion." In this volume, Salata attempted to prove that the Italian right to Istria was based on history, rather than "on the wings of Dante's and Carducci's poetry." The documents provided by Salata started with the 1797 Treaty of Campo Formio and terminated with the 1882 Triple Alliance, although there were also indirect references to Rome and Venice.

In both the war and interwar period, Salata was employed as both an historian and administrator of the contested regions. In the first month after Italy's entry into the war, he entered the Secretary General for the "Civic Affairs at the Supreme Command of the Army in the War Zone" (Segretariato generale per gli affari civili presso il Comando supremo dell'esercito in zona di guerra), and was increasingly given more responsibilities, eventually becoming the vice-secretary of the agency.

In the meantime, the Austrian authorities retaliated on his wife Ilda Mizzan and his daughter Maria, who were incarcerated for more than a year, from 1916 to 1917. During her imprisonment, his wife contracted tuberculosis, of which she would die in 1922, after years spent between sanatoriums and health clinics.

==== Treaty of Rapallo ====
After the war, Salata took part in the Paris Peace Conference of 1919–1920, producing material supporting Italy's claim, and contest those of the State of Slovenes, Croats and Serbs. In 1919 he was named 2nd class prefect. He later gained more power, and was entrusted with the direction of the headquarters of the new provinces (Ufficio centrale delle Nuove provincie). He also became Councilor of State. Salata endeavored to adapt the newly annexed territories to Italy, but also to preserve the positive aspects of the autonomy those territories had had under Austria. Because of this, he clashed with less liberal politicians. The latter opposed any concessions to the minority German speaking and Slavic speaking populations.

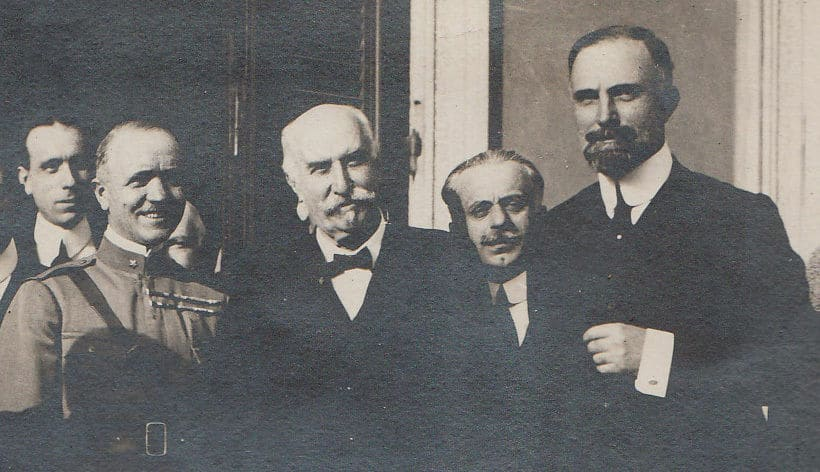
Salata (second from right, between Carlo Sforza and Giovanni Giolitti) after the signing of the Treaty of Rapallo

Salata always had the strong support of Prime Minister Nitti, and was likewise supported by Giovanni Giolitti, who employed him in the negotiations that led to the signing of the treaty of Rapallo in 1920, in which Salata played a crucial role. Salata acted as an intermediary between the two delegations, and his conversations with Serbian Foreign Minister Ante Trumbić determined the extent of Italy's territorial gains. A few days after the treaty, Salata was named senator. During the first Bonomi government, Salata's sway decreased. However, he was able to establish regional advisory panels, which were open to the prominent local political personalities of the different areas, including from the minorities, which were given the duty of studying and approve the process of annexation of the new territories to Italy.

=== Fascism ===
Salata was initially criticized by the fascists, who made propaganda against him and in 1922 even attacked the car on which he was travelling with his daughter during a visit to Trento. The fascists celebrated the suppression of the Ufficio centrale delle Nuove provincie by the Facta government, which took place on 17 October 1922. The latter event paved the way for the definitive annexation of the Italian irredent lands, without regard to the local population, its language, culture and administrative practices.

In 1924 Salata published his extensive work on Guglielmo Oberdan, Guglielmo Oberdan secondo gli atti segreti del processo: carteggi diplomatici e altri documenti inediti ("Guglielmo Oberdan According to the Secret Trial Documents: Diplomatic Correspondence and Other Unpublished Documents"), which was republished simply as Oberdan in a reduced version in 1932. In this work he defends the Italian "full-bloodedness" of Oberdan with arguments "that are not very persuasive." Salata argued that Oberdan's mother, Gioseffa Maria Oberdank, had been “Italian for many generations" and thus "in the martyr’s veins there ran no mixed blood, but purely Italian blood, both from his mother’s and his father’s side." The book was well received in Fascist Italy. After publishing his book on Oberdan and other treaties such as L'Italia e la Triplice: secondo i nuovi documenti austro-germanici ("Italy and the Triple Alliance: According to New Austro-German Documents", 1923), Salata was employed by Mussolini and the Italian regime as an expert in archives and historian "of patriotic inspiration". In particular, a 1925 meeting of the two former "rivals" Mussolini and Salata marked the latter's entry in the ranks of the Italian regime, with Salata later "becoming an exponent of Fascism, though not in the vanguard". Mussolini would go on to send Salata money—100,000 lire, the equivalent of several tens of thousands of US dollars in 2026—during the latter's last years in Rome, knowing him was then poor, but, as recounted by Cardinal Celso Costantini, Salata refused the money out of pride. Salata was appointed to several prominent positions in the Italian academic world. He obtained the Fascist Party card ad honorem in 1929, on the occasion of his speech in Pisino (Pazin), and was signed to the National Fascist Union of the Senate (Unione nazionale fascista del Senato). In 1929 he also published his work Per la storia diplomatica della Questione romana ("On the Diplomatic History of the Roman Question"). This work received an extensive review by The Times, and was praised in reviews by the University of Chicago's The Journal of Modern History and by the University of Leuven's Revue d'histoire ecclésiastique. In the same year, he began working at the archive of the Italian Foreign Ministry. As an intellectual of the regime, he legitimized fascism as the heir, or "continuator", of the Italian Risorgimento. He then published many books on history and politics, including several books on the king of Sardinia Charles Albert. Salata praised Mussolini in his Il patto Mussolini (1933), which, though a eulogy to Mussolini, is still considered an important exegesis and fundamental history work on the Four-Power Pact. According to Iryna Vushko, Salata had come far from "his initial wariness of Mussolini to serving, by the late 1920s, as the regime's key ideologist, a go-to man for nationalist propaganda".

Il patto Mussolini, 1933 cover

In 1934, with the endorsement of Mussolini, who was determined to "build an Italian presence in Austria as a hedge against Germany", he drafted a memorandum of support for the founding of an institute of Italian culture in Vienna, the Istituto Italiano di Cultura, of which he became the first director in 1935, as well as for the founding of an institute of Austrian culture in Rome. He then relocated to Vienna (where, in spite of his irredentist stance, he was still held in high esteem), to serve as unofficial intermediary between Rome and Vienna, Mussolini's personal representative to the Ballhausplatz. In 1936 he also became Italian ambassador to Austria. During his tenure, he is said to have embarked on a "ruinous policy of safeguarding Austria's autonomy and later independence from Germany". Indeed, Salata's support of Austrian independence contradicted the then-foreign policies of Mussolini, who by 1936 had realized that the Anschluss was inevitable, and thus that it was better for him to support Germany.

=== Last years ===
In order to support Fascist Italy's aggressive policies, he published Il nodo di Gibuti: storia diplomatica su documenti inediti ("The Djibouti Question: A Diplomatic History Based on Unpublished Documents", 1939), Nizza fra Garibaldi e Cavour: un discorso non pronunciato e altri documenti inediti ("Nice Between Garibaldi and Cavour: An Undelivered Speech and Other Unpublished Documents", in ISPI's quarterly journal Storia e politica internazionale, rassegna trimestrale) in 1940. In 1943 he was named President of the Foreign Affairs Committee of the Senate.

Salata died in March 1944 in Rome, a few months before the city was liberated by the Anglo-American troops. Though he resisted Nazism, Salata gradually supported Fascism and remained loyal to Mussolini until his death.

== Personal life ==
Salata was married to Ilda Mizzan, daughter of Giovanni—who ran a historic pharmacy in Trieste's Piazza Venezia—and cousin of Carlo, owner of Cittanova's (Novigrad) city pharmacy, all from a family of shoemakers turned pharmacists. Ilda was the sister of diplomat Ezio, making the latter and Salata brothers-in-law. Salata's own sister, Giovanna "Nina" Salata, likewise married a pharmacist, Elio Bracco, founder of Italian multinational Bracco. Jan Gawronski, Polish ambassador to Austria, who knew Salata well and was on good terms with him, claimed in his memoir Moja misja w Wiedniu 1932-1938 that Salata was of Jewish origin. However, according to Cardinal Celso Costantini—who was with Salata in his last years, plagued by illness—the former gave Salata a copy of his book Jesus Christ: The Way, Truth, and Life, which Costantini says Salata told him had "comforted him immensely".

== Works ==
- L'antica diocesi di Ossero e la liturgia slava: pagine di storia patria, Martinolich, Pola 1897
- Il diritto d'Italia su Trieste e l'Istria, documenti, Bocca, Turin 1915
- Guglielmo Oberdan secondo gli atti segreti del processo: carteggi diplomatici e altri documenti inediti, Zanichelli, Bologna 1924
- Per la storia diplomatica della Questione romana, Treves, Milan 1929
- Carlo Alberto inedito: il diario autografo del re, lettere intime ed altri scritti inediti, Mondadori, Milan 1931
- Maria Luigia e i moti del trentuno: documenti inediti da archivi austriaci, Fresching, Parma 1932
- Oberdan, Mondadori, Milan 1932
- Re Carlo Alberto e l’istituzione del Consiglio di Stato: propositi politici e riflessi diplomatici; con note e documenti inediti (essay) in Il Consiglio di Stato: studi in occasione del centenario, I, Istituto Poligrafico dello Stato, Rome 1932
- Il patto Mussolini: storia di un piano politico e di un negoziato diplomatico, Mondadori, Milan 1933
- Da Carlo Alberto a Vittorio Emanuele II (essay) in Rassegna storica del Risorgimento, Libreria dello Stato, Rome 1935
- Lettere di Carlo Alberto a Federico Truchsess, Le Monnier, Florence 1937
- Il nodo di Gibuti: storia diplomatica su documenti inediti, ISPI, Milan 1939

== Sources ==
- Paolo Ziller: Le Nuove province nell'immediato dopoguerra. Tra ricostruzione e autonomie amministrative (1918–1922), in Miscellanea di studi giuliani in onore di Giulio Cervani per il suo XLL compleanno, edited by F. Salimbeni, Udine 1990, pp. 243–274
- Paolo Ziller: Francesco Salata. Il bollettino la “Vita autonoma” (1904–1912) ed il liberalismo nazionale istriano nell’ultima Austria, in Atti – Centro di ricerche storiche, Rovigno, 1995, 25, pp. 423–445
- Ziller, Paolo (1997). Giuliani, istriani e trentini dall'Impero asburgico al Regno d'Italia: società, istituzioni e rapporti etnici. Civiltà del Risorgimento (in Italian). Vol. 53. Udine: Del Bianco.
- Luca Riccardi: Francesco Salata tra storia, politica e diplomazia, Udine 2001
- Luca Riccardi: Francesco Salata, il trattato di Rapallo e la politica estera italiana verso la Jugoslavia all’inizio degli anni Venti, in Quaderni giuliani di storia, 1994, 2, pp. 75–91
- Riccardi, Luca (1997). "Le carte Salata: quarant'anni tra politica e storia". Il futuro della memoria: atti del Convegno internazionale di studi sugli archivi di famiglie e di persone, Capri, 9–13 settembre 1991 (in Italian). Ministero per i beni culturali e ambientali, Ufficio centrale per i beni archivistici. pp. 614–628. ISBN 978-88-7125-126-4.
