= Stornelli Legionari =

Italian Social Republic song

"Stornelli Legionari", also known as Vogliamo scolpire una lapide (transl. We want to carve a tombstone), is a pro-fascist, anti-monarchy and anti-armistice song of the Italian Social Republic.

The song uses the melody of the Inno a Oberdan (which celebrates Guglielmo Oberdan, the Italian irredentist who attempted to assassinate the Habsburg Emperor Franz Joseph in 1882) and explicitly calls for death to the King and Pietro Badoglio.

The song also honors Rodolfo Graziani, who was the only Italian Marshal to remain loyal to Mussolini after the fall of the Fascist regime in Italy.

In the lyrics the word "repubblican" is not standard Italian, as it is a truncated variant of "repubblicano" and "repubblicani" used in the song for rhythmic purposes. The name "Grazian" is also a truncated version of the name "Graziani".

== Lyrics ==
Original

Vogliamo scolpire una lapide
incisa su l'umile scoglio,
a morte il marchese Badoglio
noi siam fascisti repubblican.

A morte il re
viva Grazian,
evviva il fascio
repubblican!

Vogliamo scolpire una lapide
incisa su pelle di troia,
a morte la casa Savoia
noi siam fascisti repubblican.

A morte il re
viva Grazian,
evviva il fascio
repubblican!

Translation

We want to carve a tombstone
Engraved on the humble rock,
Death to Marquis Badoglio
We are republican fascists.

Death to the king,
long live Grazian,
Long live the Republican Fascist Party!

We want to carve a tombstone
Engraved on a sow's hide,
Death to the House of Savoy
We are republican fascists.

Death to the king,
long live Grazian,
Long live the Republican Fascist Party!

== See also ==
- Giovinezza, the anthem of the National Fascist Party of Italy
- Bella Ciao, widely considered the anthem of the Italian Partisans, and still a popular anti-fascist song
- Horst Wessel Lied, the anthem of the National Socialist Party, written in 1929 and adopted in 1930
- March of Ukrainian Nationalists, the anthem of the OUN, written in 1929, adopted in 1932 and adapted for the Armed Forces of Ukraine in 2017.
- Njet Molotoff, a Finnish song from the Winter War which mocks Vyacheslav Molotov, the Soviet Minister of Foreign Affairs
- Qadam Qadam Badhaye Ja, marching song of the Azad Hind Fauj—still in use today by the modern Indian Armed Forces
