= Carlo Alberto inedito =

1931 book by Francesco Salata

- 1931 edition cover
- Author: Francesco Salata
- Language: Italian
- Genre: History
- Publisher: Mondadori
- Publication date: 1931
- Publication place: Italy
- Pages: 500

Carlo Alberto inedito, in full: Carlo Alberto inedito: il diario autografo del re, lettere intime ed altri scritti inediti is a history book by Italian historian Francesco Salata, published in 1931 by Mondadori.

== Overview ==
The book reports previously unknown fragments written by Charles Albert of Sardinia in his private notes in the period from 1831 to spring 1832, plus, with several gaps, the period from spring 1832 to 1841. The first fragment dates from just 7 months after Charles became King of Sardinia. The book contains correspondence between King Charles and other kings and ministers from other countries. It is a "precious mine of news on the politics of the main European countries." It contains "scattered and lucid thoughts of a great economist, of a sovereign, but also of a man who offers his help to friends". For example, one note regarding the Duchess of Barry, to whom Charles was intimately bond, reads:

The Duchess of Berry arrived in Genoa under the name of Comtesse de Sagona in the month of July, while I was there; but, out of delicacy, she did not let me know of her arrival. Scarcely had I reached Turin than she wrote to tell me of her plans, saying that she had come to Italy relying on my assistance and hoping for everything from me.

Among the letters reported by Salata in the book are also the two dramatic ones from King Charles to Maria di Robilant from Oporto, written a few days before his death.

== Reception ==
The book was praised in Italy and abroad. Paul Guiton from Tour le livres underscored that its explanations of certain "diplomatic complications" were useful in his era, which he says bore resemblances to that of Charles Albert. Gioacchino Volpe from Il Corriere della Sera praised it for its collection of documents, "enriched, by the diligent and learned editor, with introductory pages and notes that constitute a sober and effective illustration." Adolfo Franci from L'Ambrosiano praised its artistic value.
