= Renzo Pezzani =

Italian poet and writer

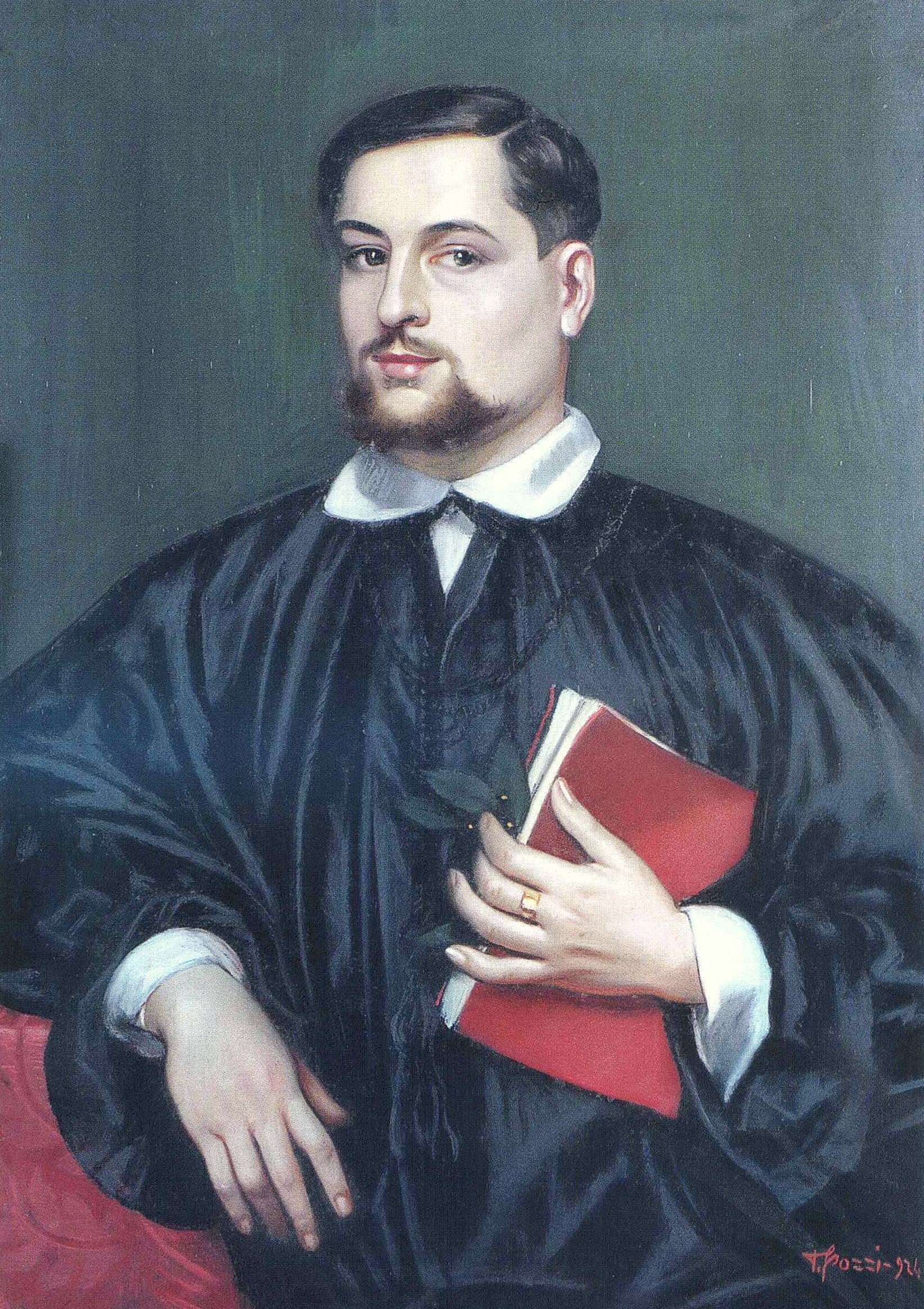
- Portrait by Donnino Pozzi, c. 1930
- Born: 14 July 1898; Parma, Kingdom of Italy
- Died: 14 July 1951 (aged 53); Castiglione Torinese, Italy

Philosophical work
- Main interests: Poetry

Renzo Pezzani (4 June 1898 – 14 July 1951) was an Italian poet and writer.

== Biography ==
He was born in Parma on 4 June 1898. After graduating as a primary school teacher, he became a teacher in the early 1920s and began writing.

He founded the magazine Difesa artistica, and also collaborated with other magazines such as the Giornale del Balilla, Cuor d'Oro and Corriere dei Piccoli. In his copious production there are numerous volumes of texts for children and for elementary schools, poems in the Italian language and Parmesan dialect, and lyrics for musical works. He translated from French the novel Le Signe sur les Mains by the Catholic writer Émile Baumann.

In 1926 he gave up teaching due to political problems.

He died in Castiglione Torinese on 14 July 1951. He is buried in Parma, in the Villetta cemetery.

== Works ==
- Ombre (verses), Parma, M. Fresching, 1920.
- Artigli, Parma, Eto, 1923.
- La Stella verde, storia d'un ragazzo e d'un sogno (fairy tale novel), Turin, Società editrice internazionale, 1926.
- La rondine sotto l'arco (lyric poetry), Turin, Società editrice internazionale, 1926.
- Il sogno di un piccolo re (fairy tale in verse, illustrated by E. Carboni), Società editrice internazionale, 1926.
- Racconti del coprifuoco, Pavia, Artigianelli, 1930.
- L'usignolo nel claustro (lyric poetry), Milan, Ed. Alpes, 1930.
- Corcontento (children's novel), Turin, Società editrice internazionale, 1931.
- Angeli verdi (songbook of Italian trees), Società editrice internazionale, 1932.
- L'apostolo dell'illusione, Pavia, Artigianelli, 1933.
- Sole, solicello, Brescia, La Scuola Editrice Tip., 1933
- Credere (fourteen short stories), Turin, Società editrice internazionale, 1934.
- La casa del padre, Pavia, Ancora, 1935.
- Il viatico nella tempesta (short story), Vicenza, Tip. Commerciale Editrice, 1935.
- Belverde (popular songs), Turin, Società editrice internazionale, 1935.
- Ruggine (fairy tale), Turin, Società editrice internazionale, 1937.
- Bornisi (verses in Parmesan dialect, with five drawings by the author), Parma, [s.n.], 1939.
- La stirpe prediletta (ten heroic tales), Turin, Società editrice internazionale, 1940.
- Il grano d'incenso (operetta in three acts to the music of Don Giuseppe Biella), Pavia, Ancora, 1940.
- Il re artigiano e altri racconti, Turin, Il Verdone, 1943.
- Tarabacli (verses in Parmesan dialect), Turin, Edizioni Il Verdone, 1943.
- Gesù, Giuseppe, Maria (Christian legends illustrated by L. Barilli), Turin, Edizioni Il Verdone, 1943.
- Oc' luster (Parmesan poems), Parma, ed. Famija Pramzana, 1950.
- Odor di cose buone (collection of poems illustrated by Angiola Resignani), G.B. Paravia & C., 1950.
- Orchidea nera (adventure novel), Turin, Società editrice internazionale, 1950.
- Innocenza, Turin, Società editrice internazionale, 1950.
- L'acqua
- Ecco l'Italia
