= Four-Power Pact =

1933 treaty among the United Kingdom, France, Italy, and Germany

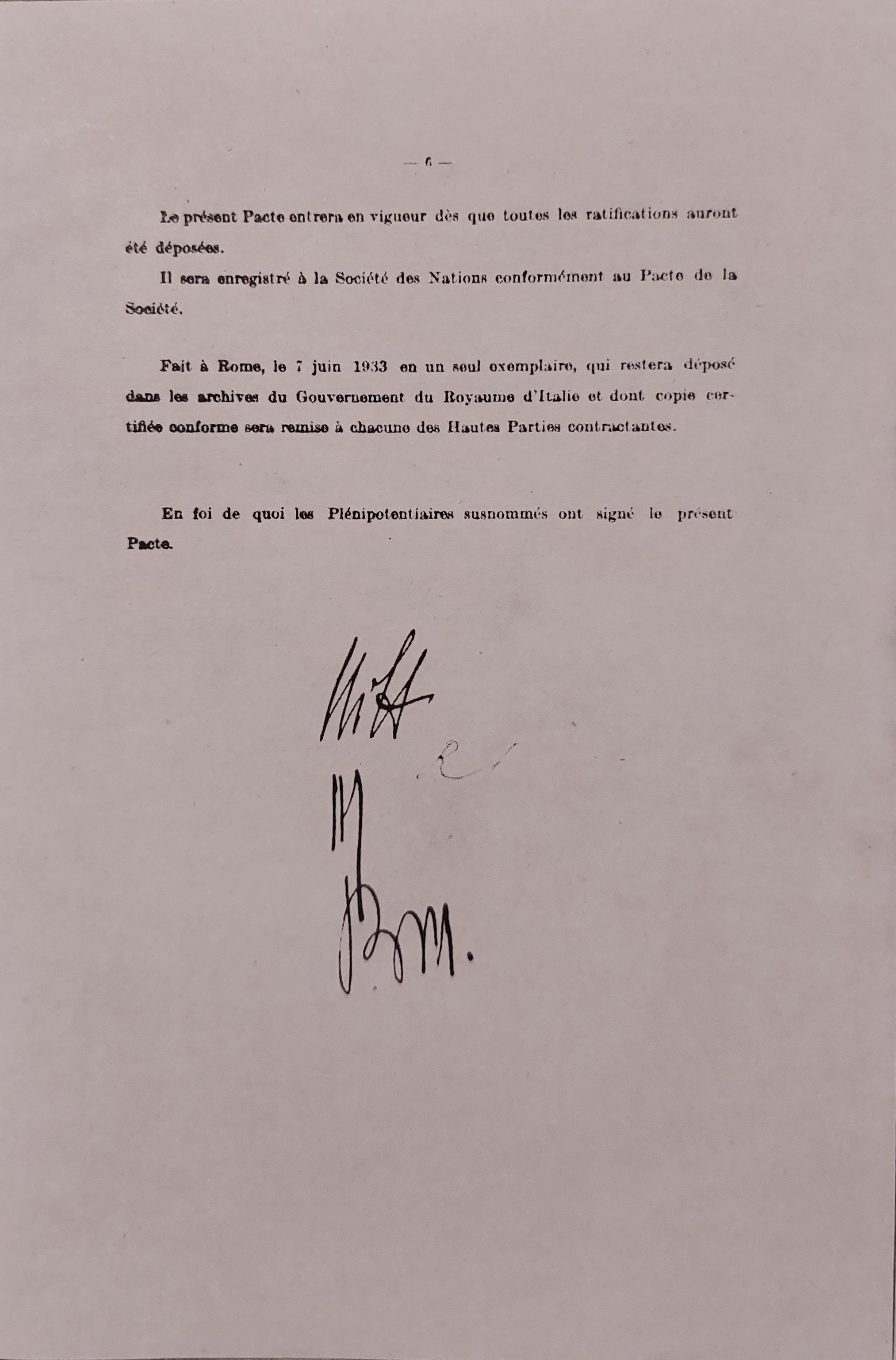
Initials on the Four-Power Pact, from Francesco Salata's Il patto Mussolini

The Four-Power Pact, also known as the Quadripartite Agreement, was an international treaty between the United Kingdom, France, Italy, and Germany that was initialed on 7 June 1933 and signed on 15 July 1933 in the Palazzo Venezia, Rome. The Pact was not ratified by the French Parliament.

== Background ==
The creator and chief promoter of the pact was Benito Mussolini, who completed its original manuscript during one of his short stays at Rocca delle Caminate, in March 1933. (Note: On 17 March 1933 French newspaper Le Temps implied that Sir Austen Chamberlain had previously tried to reach an agreement for a collaboration among the great powers but was stopped by Italy's opposition. German newspaper Völkischer Beobachter claimed, in its 21 March 1933 issue, that the kernel of the plan originated from German deputy Alfred Rosenberg, who had exposed it at the Convegno Volta in Rome in November 1932, with the plan later being simply picked up by Mussolini. Further, before reaching Rome for a surprise meeting with Mussolini in March 1933, where the pact was first discussed, British prime minister Ramsay MacDonald declared to the British newspapers that he hoped to talk with Mussolini about "forming a group of Powers of good will to try and solve the situation" of disorder and discomfort in Europe, trying to bring peace and security in Europe. According to Salata, MacDonald was "evidently informed of Mussolini's plan, at least about the general lines", while, regarding the claims of the Völkischer Beobachter, he points out that the genesis of Mussolin's plan dates back to much earlier than November 1932, adding that, for example, Mussolini had already publicly exposed his idea of a plan of collaboration among the four powers in his speech from 23 October 1932 in Turin. Regarding the alleged Italian "dissidence" reported by Le Temps, Salata reports that such dissidence never existed since it was Mussolini who came up with the pact and took the initiative in the first place.) Against the backdrop of the Great Depression and the Nazi rise to power, Mussolini called for the creation of the Four-Power Pact on 19 March 1933 as a better means of ensuring international security. Under the plan, smaller nations would have less of a voice in great power politics. Representatives of the United Kingdom, France, Germany and Italy signed a diluted version of Mussolini's Four-Power Pact proposal.

Mussolini's chief motive in suggesting the pact was his wish for closer relations with France. Though Mussolini's purpose may have been to calm Europe's nerves, the pact actually caused the opposite result. It reaffirmed each country's adherence to the Covenant of the League of Nations, the Locarno Treaties and the Kellogg-Briand Pact.

The pact was intended to be the solution to the issue of sovereign powers coming together and operate in an orderly way, which had been the purpose of the League of Nations. Mussolini's goal was to reduce the power of the small states in the League of Nations by a bloc of major powers.

The Four-Power Pact had little significance but was not completely devoid of merit. The Four-Power Pact was supposed to be a solution to the exploitation of the balance of power, which was of interest to Italy and also appealed to the British.

However, the pact faced speculation in France and Germany. Since London and Rome were close enough to mediate between Paris and Berlin, France was alarmed.

== Negotiation, initialing and signing ==
The pact was ultimately supported by all the four great powers, as well as other states. MacDonald was the first to come to Italy to discuss the pact, anticipating Mussolini, according to Salata, evidently informed of the Duce's idea. France ultimately approved the pact, and in April 1933 Daladier and Paul-Boncour expressed their support for the continuation of negotiations of the pact. Likewise, the Grand Council of Fascism gave its strong support to the "action of the head of the Fascist government." In April 1933 Rome was informed that Belgium hailed Mussolini's idea of a pact among the four powers, only pointing out that it expected to be included in the discussions when these touched upon Belgium's interests, especially when discussing the colonies in Africa, receiving assurances from Italy in this regard. In the same month von Papen hailed the "genial idea of Mussolini", while Hitler, in his 17 May speech, reiterated his support and approval of the pact.

=== The Pentecost incident ===
During the negotiations occurred what came to be known as the "Pentecost incident". When it was thought that the four powers had reached an agreement, with the 31 May issue of the Times even giving for granted the publication of the pact for the following day, it turned out that France had agreed by negotiating on a previous version of the treaty, different from those considered at the moment by the other countries, and everything had to be started over again. The last text, which was thought to have been approved by everyone, was not known in Paris, from which the French government had negotiated on the basis of a different text. The text on whose basis the French were negotiating was a previous version, proposed by the French themselves. The telephone, which had substituted letters and telegrams in the last part of the negotiations, was deemed responsible; further, suspicions of a scheme were raised. The French ambassador de Jouvenel, a strong supporter of Mussolini's pact, took the blame on himself, adding that any mistakes must have happened in good faith. The negotiations had quickened in the last days, after having been very sluggish in the beginning. Salata notes that the "modern tools had played a bad trick". He further notes that the extensive use of the telephone in the last part of the negotiations will make it difficult for future historians of the Four-Power Pact, who won't find written documents for all phases of this negotiation.

=== Initials and signature ===
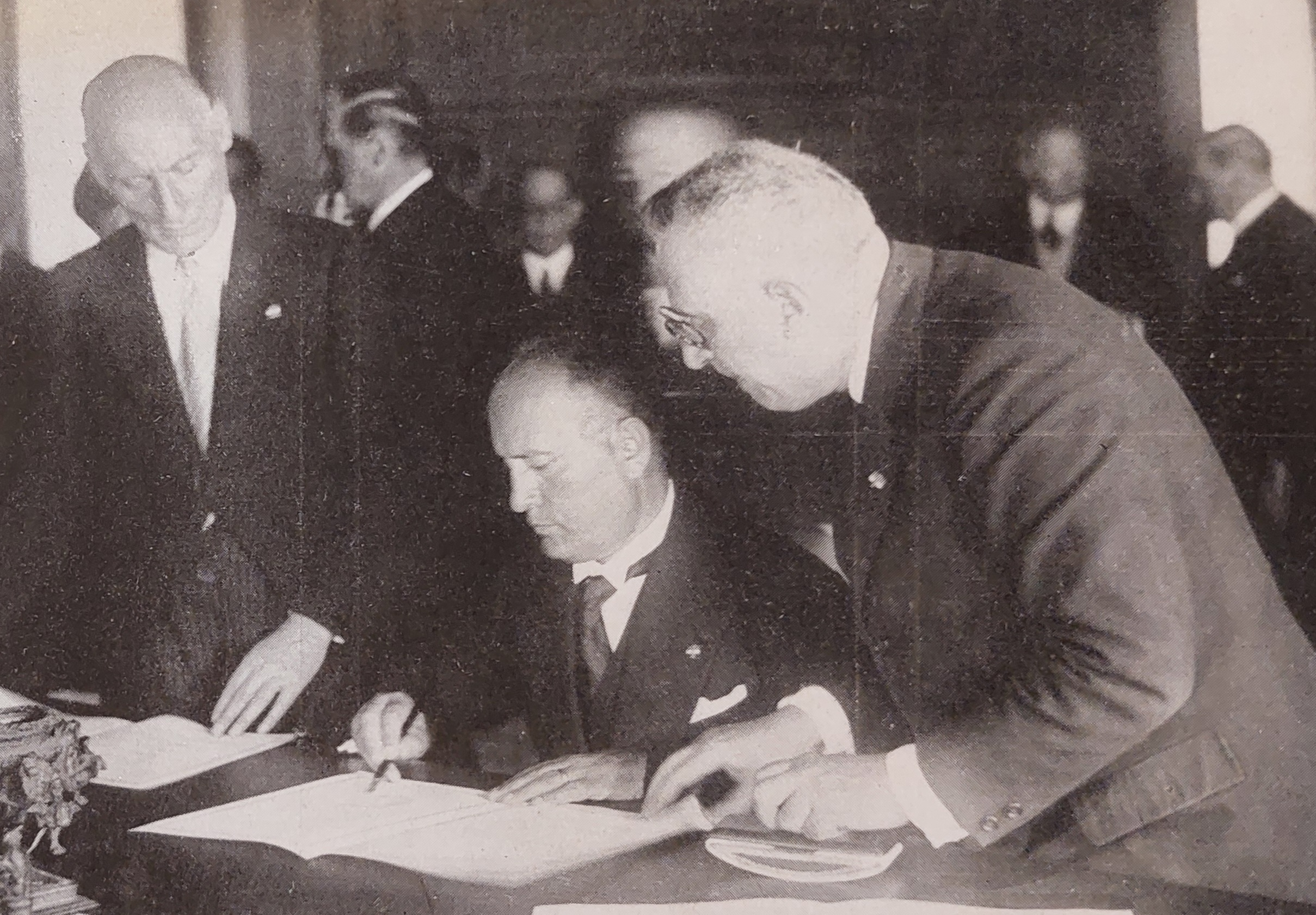
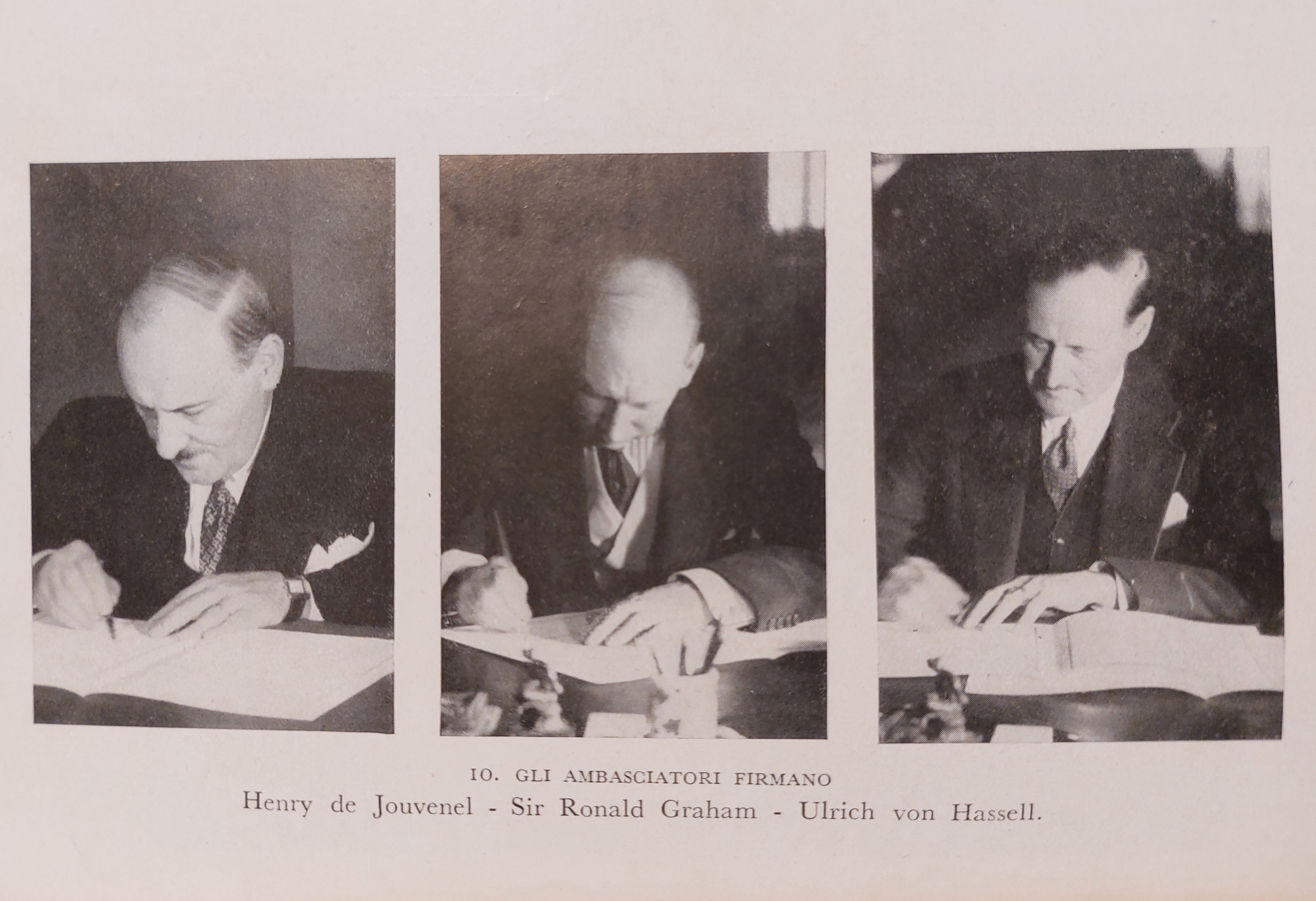
Mussolini (top) and the French, English and German ambassadors to Italy signing the Four-Power Pact

The difference between the texts, and the root of the disagreement, was linked to the article three of the proposed Pact, which had to do with the question of the disarmament, which especially interested Germany. After the Pentecost incident, the French then proposed to simply suppress the article 3, an idea which was immediately rejected by the other powers. Eventually the four great powers agreed on an apparently more generic version of the article 3, proposed by the British, and close to the original draft by Mussolini.

At half past five PM, after the consent from Berlin, the four powers agreed on initialling the pact. Mussolini then reached Palazzo Madama, where he pronounced to the senate his speech regarding the pact, whose central part he had composed in the past few days, retouching it till the last moment, perhaps even during his trip to Palazzo Madama. His speech was warmly praised, with Salata calling it the greatest speech ever pronounced by any Italian head of state or minister, and the greatest interpretation of the "feelings and life's purpose of the others and of the universality". After Mussolini's speech at the senate, the pact was initialed at Palazzo Venezia at half past seven in the evening that same day.

The pact would eventually be signed on 15 July in Palazzo Venezia. In the protocol of the initials it was agreed that, whatever the day of the signature, the pact would bear the date of 7 June 1933, an expressive act of the will of the governments.

== Outcome ==
The document that was signed bore little resemblance to the initial proposal. In practice, the Four-Power Pact proved of little significance in international affairs, but it was one of the factors contributing to the German-Polish Declaration of Non-Aggression of 1934.

It has been argued that the Four-Power Pact could have safeguarded the European balance of power with the hope of balancing peace and security in Europe. However, the Great Depression was running rampant in Europe, and the rise of Hitler to power also made this unlikely. Poland's reliance on France had been weakened, and differing attitudes emerged of the pact between Poland and Czechoslovakia. Opposition to the revision of the Four-Power Pact was expressed by Poland and the Little Entente, as apparent in the French dilution of the pact in this final form. It is apparent that the Four-Power pact had a negative impact of France's allies in Central and Eastern Europe.

== Role of Hitler ==
The rise of Adolf Hitler to power was an adequate reason to propose alternative power arrangements. However, what had started as an alternative to the League of Nations ended as a reassertion of devotion to that failing institution. Hitler was willing to accept the gratuitous triumph of the League of Nation's death. The pact soon failed, but the United Kingdom, in particular, did not easily throw away the Pact's idea. Germany's withdrawal from the League put the Pact on hold.

The Pact had major impact on modern law. For six years, the United Kingdom would make vain attempts to make it work at nearly any cost, but the failure of the Four-Power Pact served as a warning of Germany's continued withdrawal from diplomatic relations with France and the United Kingdom in the buildup to the Second World War.

== Literature ==
- Francesco Salata: Il patto Mussolini, Milan, Mondadori, 1933.

== Gallery ==
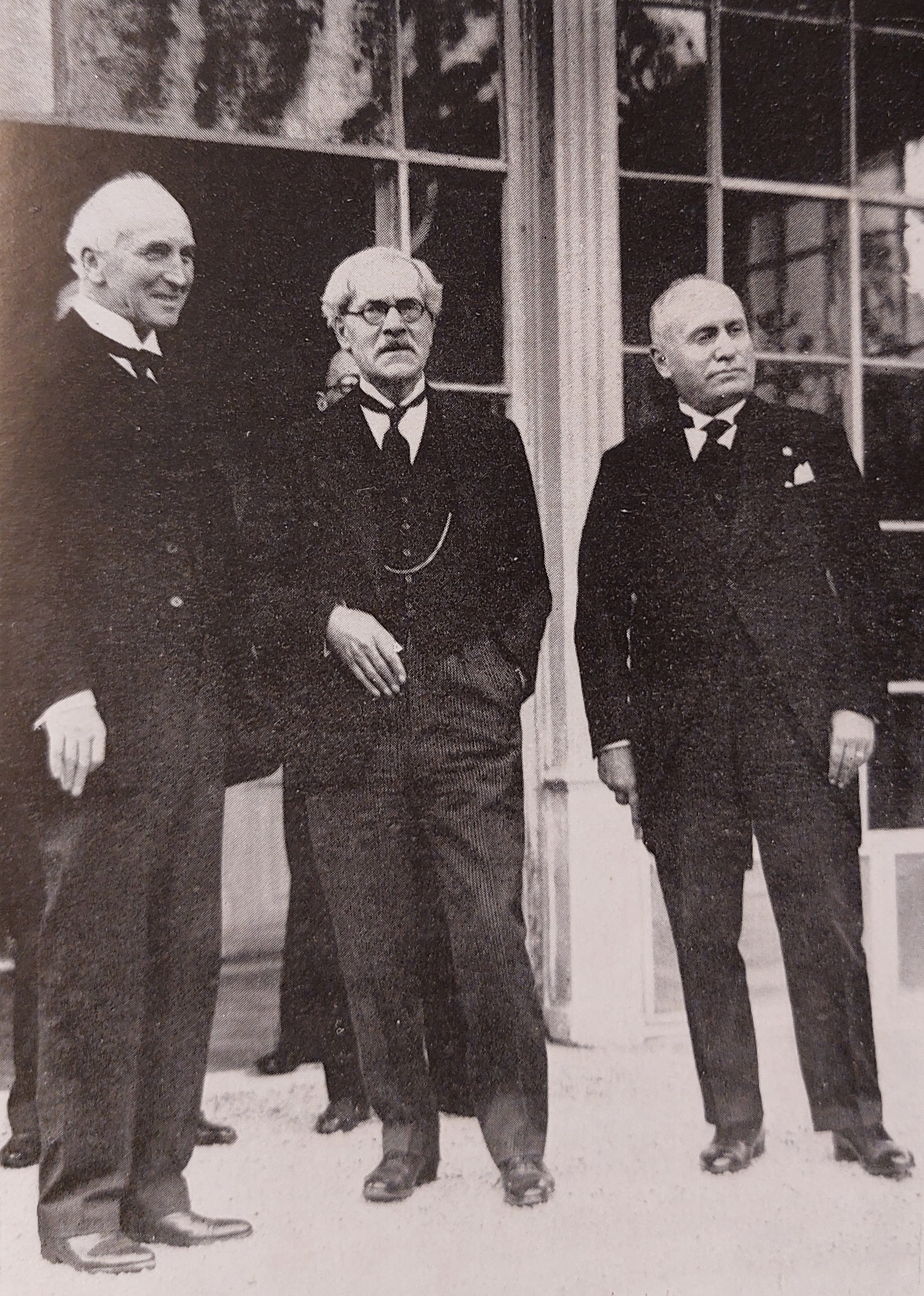
Simon, MacDonald, Mussolini at the British Embassy in Rome on 19 March 1933

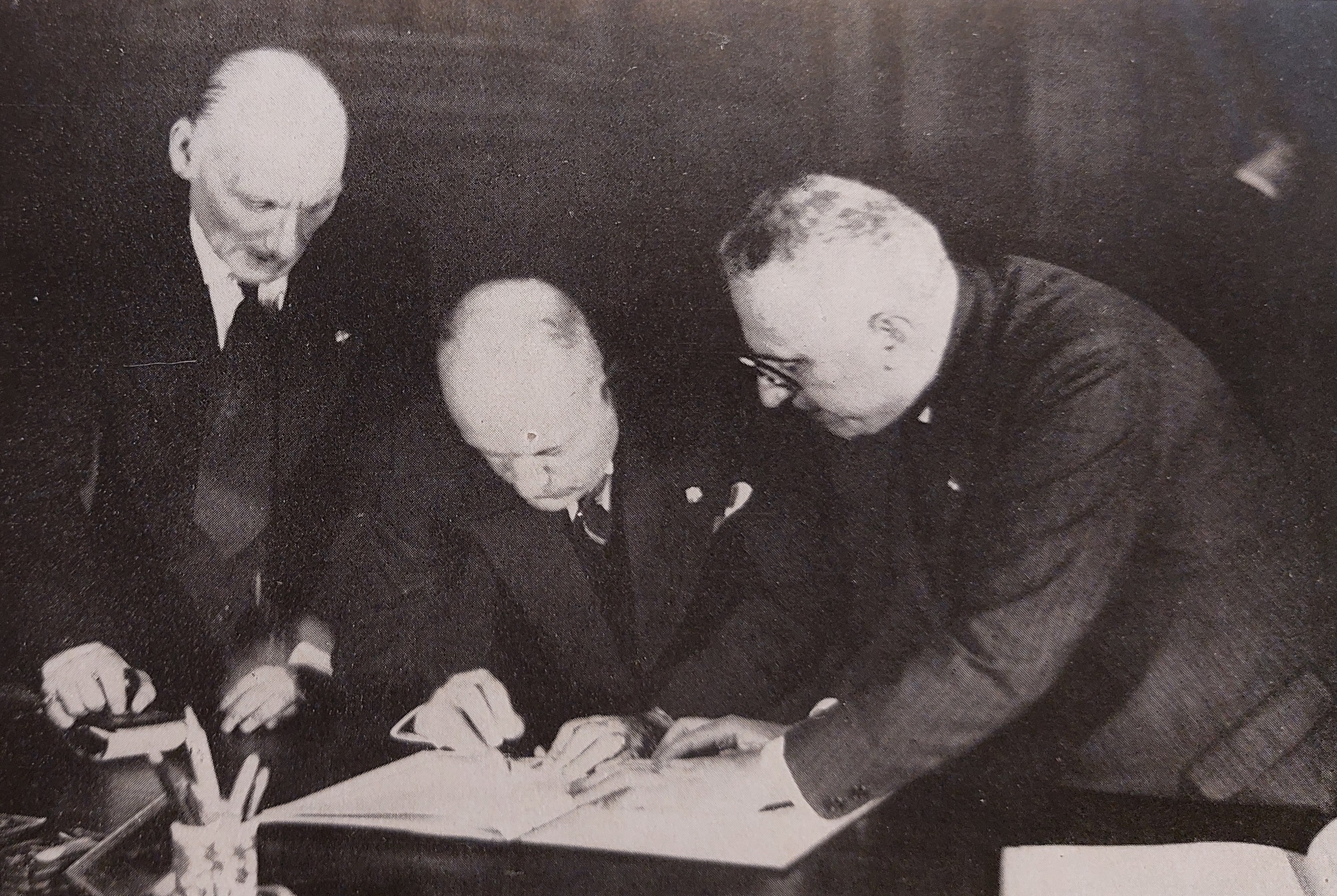
Mussolini initialling the Four-Power Pact on 7 June 1933

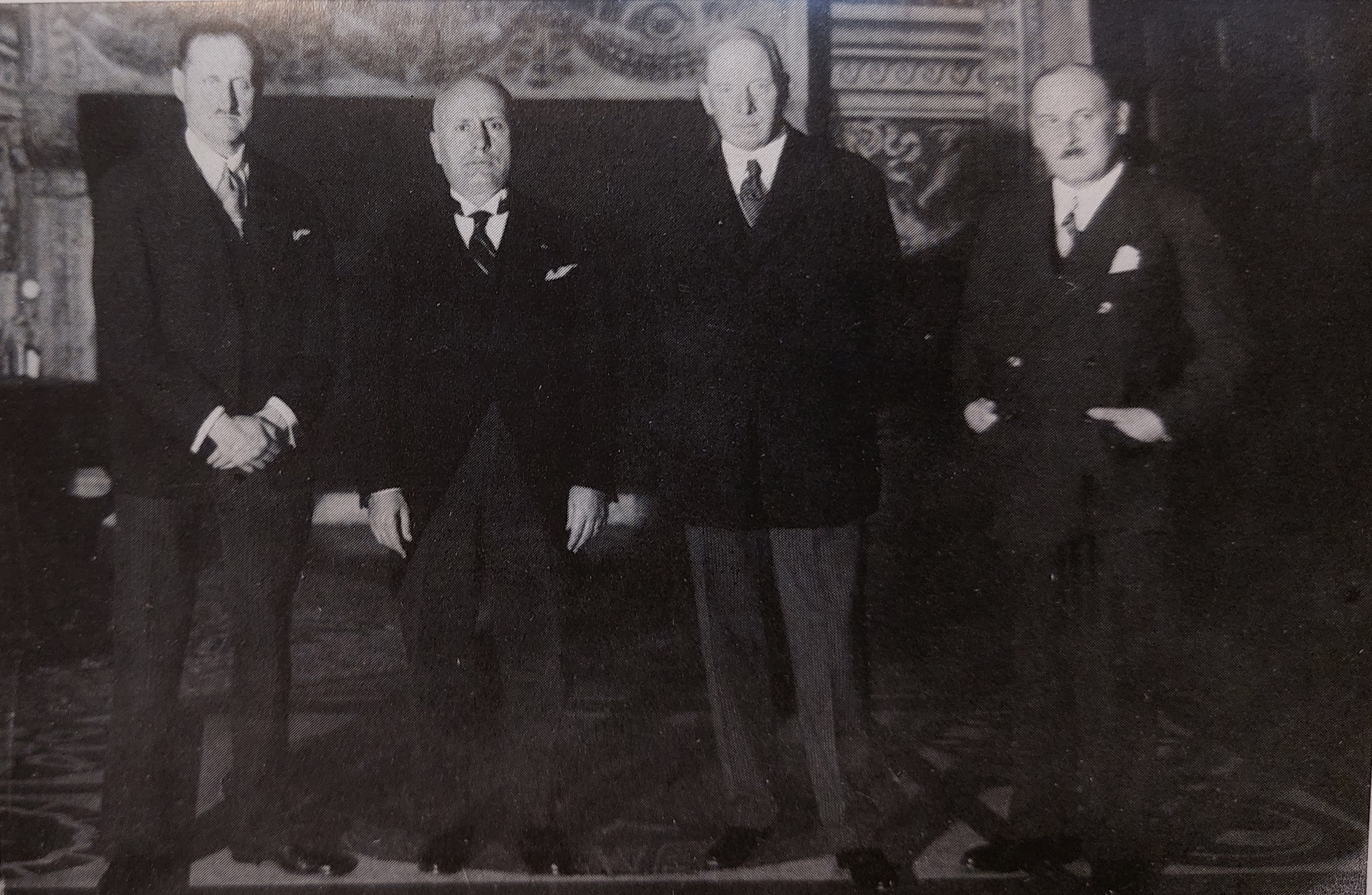
Hassel, Mussolini, Graham, and de Jouvenel after the initialling of the pact, 7 June 1933

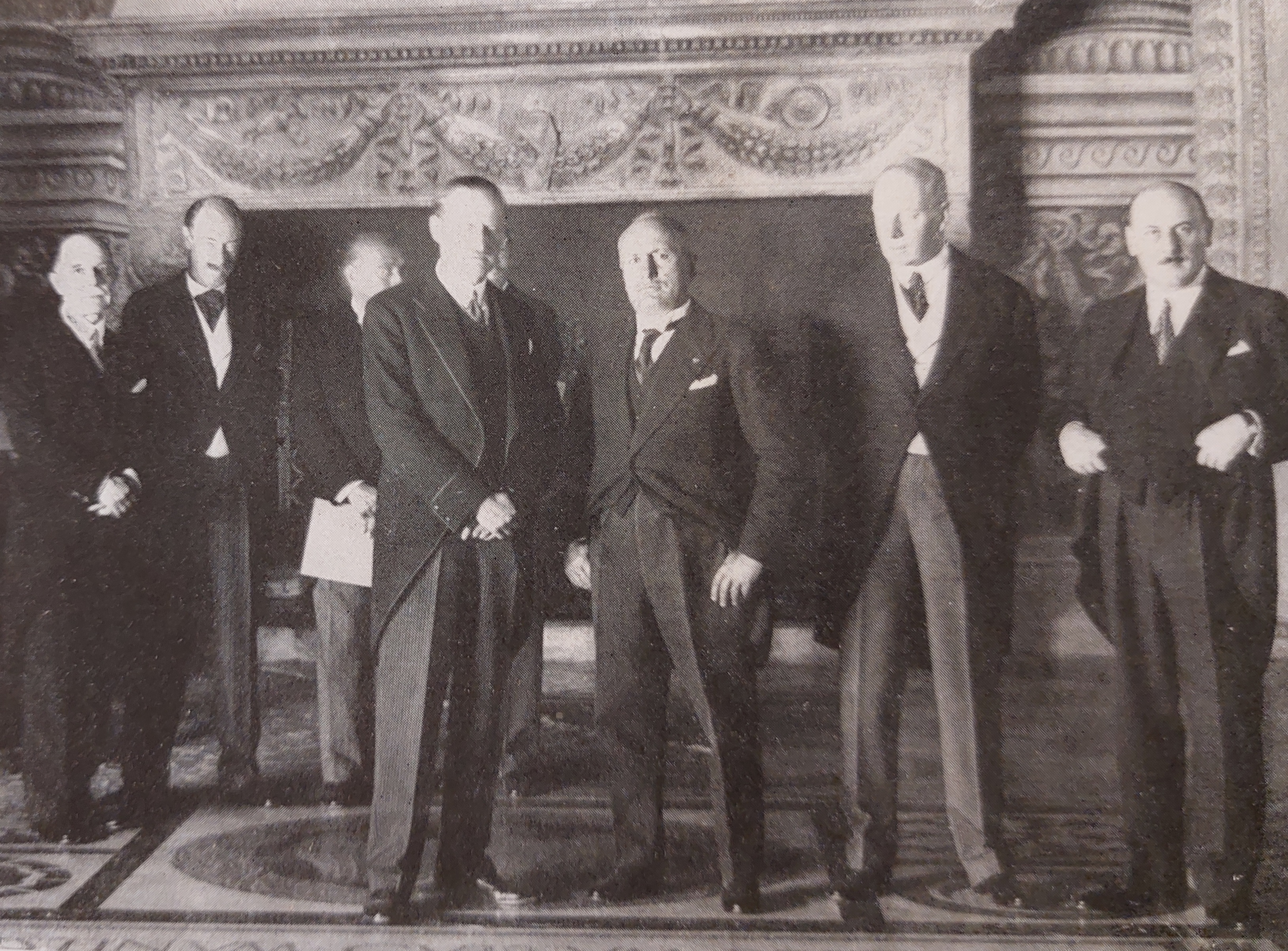
Mussolini and the ambassadors at Palazzo Venezia, after the signing of the pact, 15 July 1933

== Sources ==
- Salata, Francesco (1933). Il patto Mussolini. Mondadori.
- Jarausch, Konrad Hugo (January 1967). "The Four-Power Pact, 1933". The American Historical Review. 72 (2). Oxford University Press: 571–572. doi:10.2307/1859293. JSTOR 1859293.
- Zbigniew, Mazur (October 1981). "Pakt Czterech". The American Historical Review. 86 (4). Oxford University Press: 880. doi:10.2307/1860241. JSTOR 1860241.
- Wallace, W.V. (January 1967). "International Affairs". Royal Institute of International Affairs. 43 (1): 104–105. doi:10.2307/2612521. JSTOR 2612521.
