= Fresching =

- Status: Defunct
- Founder: Mario Fresching
- Country of origin: Italy
- Headquarters location: Parma
- Publication types: Books.

Fresching was an Italian publishing house based in Parma.

== History ==
The publishing house was founded in Parma, Emilia Romagna, Italy, by Mario Fresching. Mario Fresching was the most important typographer in Parma in his day. Politically, Fresching was initially a socialist, then an interventionist leading up to Italy's entry into World War I, and finally one of the founders of the fascio of Parma in 1919. In 1941 Fresching printed an anthology of young authors, including a number of local writers who would go on to leave a mark on the culture of the city of Parma.

It published works by authors such as Renzo Pezzani, Francesco Salata, Pietro Giordani, Ferdinando Bernini, Giuseppe Balestrazzi, Giovanni Copertini, Luigi Sorrento, Franco Fochi, Gaetano Cesari and Arnaldo Barilli.

Its founder died shortly after the closure of the typography.
