= Obelisk of the Fallen in the Wars of Independence, Florence =

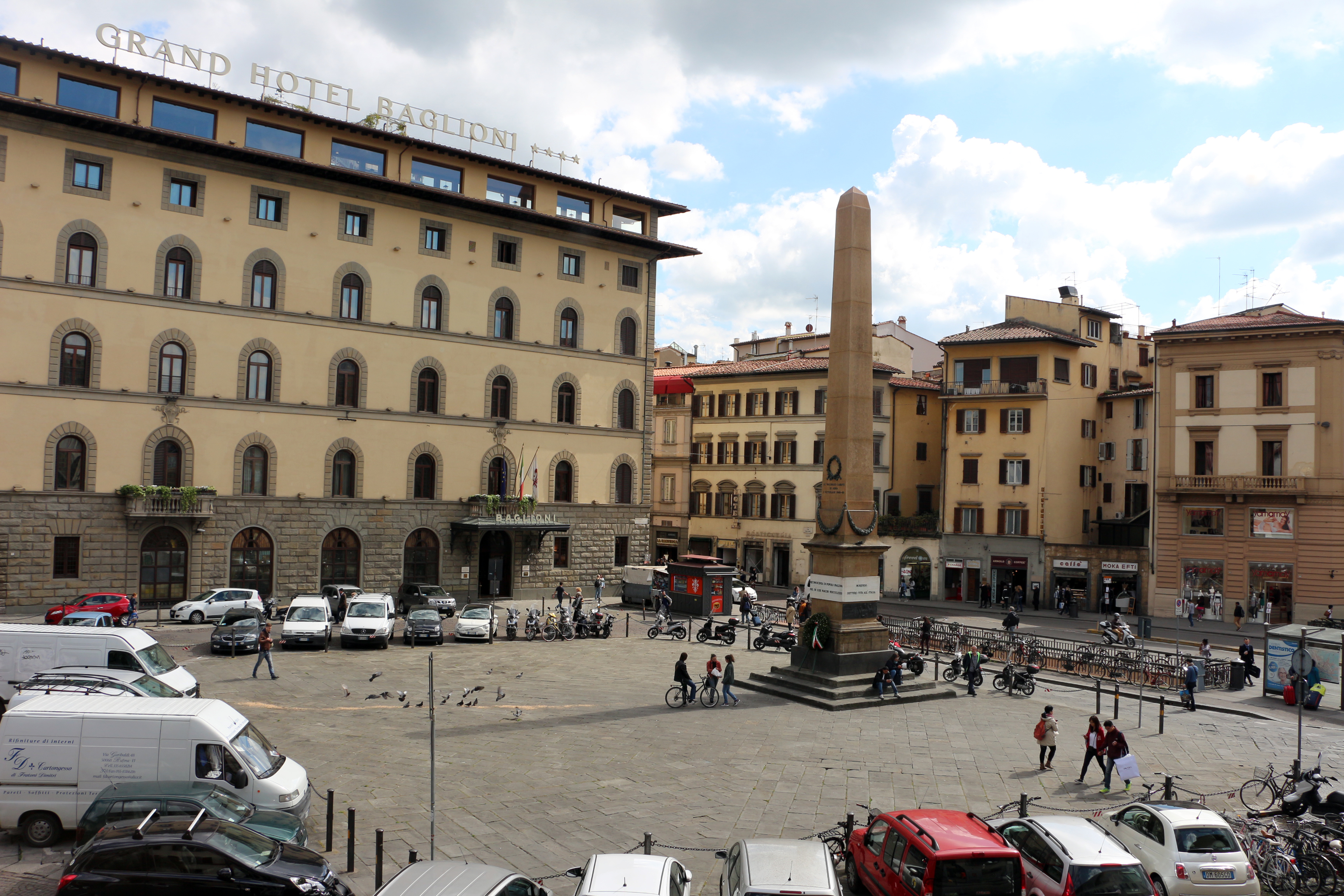
Obelisk to the Fallen in the Wars of Independence, Florence

The Obelisk of the Fallen in the Wars of Independence (Obelisco dei Caduti delle Guerre d'Indipendenza) in the Piazza dell'Unità Italiana, once called the Piazza Vecchia di Santa Maria Novella, is a monument located in the piazza just east of the apse of Santa Maria Novella, surrounded by large hotels and offices located near the main train station in Florence, Italy.

== History ==
The monument was commissioned in 1880 by the veterans of the battles of 1848–1849, to commemorate those fallen in the battles of independence from 1821 to 1870. The 15 meter obelisk was erected on May 29, 1882, in a piazza renamed for Italian Unity. With further wars, more plaques were added over the decades.

The engineer Giovanni Pini and the architect Mazzanti erected a stelae consisting of various stone elements; Along the facades are marble plaques with names and decoration. The original design was by Angelo Ambucchi, the reliefs are by Delio Granchi. Among the names specifically memorialized by the monument are the irredentist patriots: Guglielmo Oberdan, a conspirator was executed for planning to assassinate the emperor of Austria-Hungary Franz Joseph in 1882 at Trieste); Cesare Battisti, an Austrian politician from the then Austrian city of Trento who fought for the Italians, was captured, and hung as a traitor; and Nazario Sauro, officer in the Italian Navy during World War I, was captured during a mission, and executed in now Croatia for treason since he was born in Capodistria, then part of Austria-Hungary.
