= Oberdan (name) =

Oberdan is both a masculine given name and a surname. Notable people with the name include:

== Given name ==
- Oberdan Cattani (1919–2014), Brazilian football player
- Oberdan Sallustro (1915–1972), Italian-Paraguayan businessman

== Surname ==
- Guglielmo Oberdan, (1858–1882), Italian irredentist

== Pen name ==
- Oberdán Rocamora, pen name of Jorge Asís (born 1946), Argentine journalist and politician
