= Rome Med - Mediterranean Dialogues =

Annual high-level conference on Mediterranean geopolitics since 2015

Rome Med – Mediterranean Dialogues
- Formation: 2015
- Legal status: Non-profit foundation
- Location: Rome, Italy
- Methods: Host conferences
- Website: med.ispionline.it

The Rome Med – Mediterranean Dialogue is an annual high-level conference on Mediterranean geopolitics promoted by the Italian Ministry of Foreign Affairs and International Cooperation and ISPI (Italian Institute for International Political Studies). It took place for the first time in 2015 and has since then been hosted every year in Rome, Italy. The aim of the conference is primarily to rethink traditional approaches to the Mediterranean area complementing analyses of current challenges with new ideas and suggestions to draft a new 'positive agenda', addressing shared challenges at the regional and international level.

The list of attendees includes Heads of States, Governments and International Organizations, think tanks and academics, Ministers, Members of Parliament as well as leaders in Business, Culture and Media.

The conference, held annually in November or December at the Parco dei Principi Hotel in Rome, is preceded by "Towards MED", a series of preparatory events in other countries of the world about relevant themes concerning the Mediterranean region.

In 2020, MED was listed again as the 3rd best think tank conference globally. The 7th edition of the conference will be held from 2 to 4 December 2021.

== Purpose ==
The conference aims to bring together think tanks, academic institutions, NGOs as well as international organizations, government officials, and decision-makers from across the globe.

The focal point of the conference is the discussion of current issues and challenges of the broader Mediterranean region as to gather all relevant international stake-holders and actors. Since its creation in 2015, MED has become a prominent venue for diplomacy and policy debate on the Middle East and North Africa regions' stability, prosperity and peace.

== Pillars of MED ==
The four characteristic pillars of the Rome MED Dialogues are: prosperity, migration, security, culture, and civil society. In the context of every edition, the themes and topics touched on as part of these pillars change as to reflect the ongoing issues in need of being addressed and faced by the MENA community. As part of the 2020 edition, the following were emphasized: prioritization of a green and sustainable economic recovery; the need for regional cooperation between countries of origin and transit for sustainable migration management; moving towards a more holistic and broader context of human security; the need to include women and youth; and the protection of human rights as a founding principle of intraregional and international relations.

== Activities ==
=== Rome Conference ===
The structure of the conference is laid across 3 days, involving in part dialogues as well closed-door forum amongst experts taking place typically in December. Over its previous editions, MED has been characterized by the participation of high-level officials from all relevant countries in the area. In the past, the Italian President Sergio Mattarella has opened and assisted to the conference alongside the Italian Foreign Minister, Luigi Di Maio. Further memorable attendances were some of the following:Josep Borrell, the High-Representative for Foreign Affairs and Security Policy of the European Union as well as the Commissioner for Economic Affairs for the European Commission, Paolo Gentiloni. Saudi Arabia's Foreign Minister, Prince Faisal bin Farhan Al Saud has also attended alongside Qatar's Minister of Foreign Affairs, Mohammed bin Abdulrahman bin Jassim Al-Thani as well as NATO's Secretary General Jens Stoltenberg and U.S. Secretary of State John Kerry. Additionally, the 2019 edition saw the participation of the United Nations Special Envoy for Syria, Geir Otto Pedersen.

Other usual guests of the conference are Russian Foreign Minister Sergey Lavrov, UAE's Foreign Minister Anwar Gargash, and Iranian Foreign Minister Mohammad Javad Zarif. Although the fifth edition of MED in 2020 was held virtually due to the pandemic, the conference saw an impressive number of speakers as well as participants. Amongst them, were Iraq's Vice Prime Minister and Minister of Foreign Affairs Fuad Hussein, who delivered a speech. Additional guests further included Qatar's Minister of Commerce and Industry, His Excellency Sultan bin Rashid Al-Khater.

=== Other Events ===
MED has inherently become a year-long initiative. Over the course of the months prior to the conference itself, an important number of panels, regional meetings, and dialogues initiatives are held. In the context of the 2020 edition, 28 of these events were hosted to discuss a variety of topics such as the U.S. Foreign Policy in the MENA region following the elections, regional dynamics in the time of quarantine, and tourism in Europe and the Gulf under and after the pandemic.

For 3 years now, MED has also hosted an annual Youth Forum contest where the purpose is to give the Mediterranean region's youth a chance to present innovative projects aimed at facilitating dialogue and fostering development within and outside of the region. The successful 2020 edition focused on finding a post-Covid recovery strategy. In contrast, the 2021 edition will centre around the theme of Green and Sustainable Solutions for the Future.

=== Publications ===
MED further includes 3 different types of publications: ISPI MED reports, ISPI MED Dossier, and MED This Week. A MED report is similar to a printed essay, co-edited typically by ISPI and one of its established think-tank partners where each expert involved provide a chapter. In contrast, a MED Dossier consists of a collection of short articles of around 2 pages that address different dimensions of one topic or trend, but that is not printed. Finally, MED This Week (MTW) is a weekly newsletter collecting short opinions or comments amongst ISPI's extensive network of exports on specific regional events which happened or took place that week.

== Conference Editions ==
=== 2015 Conference ===
The first edition of the MED Conference took place from 10 to 12 December 2015 in Rome. Present during the event were representatives from 34 countries as well as 400 leaders in business, culture, and politics. Amongst these was then Minister of Foreign Affairs, Paolo Gentiloni who is now the EU Commissioner of Economic Affairs.

=== 2016 Conference ===
The second edition of the MED Conference took place from 1 to 3 December 2016 where 40 Head of States, ministers, and top representatives from international organizations were present as well as 500 leaders in business, politics, and culture. Amongst the guest, was the honorable presence of Qatar's Minister of Foreign Affairs, Mohammed bin Abdulrahman bin Jassim Al-Thani.

=== 2017 Conference ===
The third edition of the MED Conference took place from 30 November to 2 December 2017. That year governmental representatives from 56 countries were present as well as over 80 members of think tanks and international institutions. Amongst these was the participation of Lebanese President, Michel Aoun.

=== 2018 Conference ===
The fourth edition of the MED Conference took place from 22 to 24 November 2018 in Rome. Amongst the guests that year were both Iraq's President Barham Salih, as well as the Minister for Foreign Affairs Mohamed Ali Alhakim.

=== 2019 Conference ===
The fifth edition of the MED Conference took place from the 5 to 7 December 2019. Amongst the memorable participants was the Turkish Foreign Minister, Mevlüt Çavuşoğlu who participated in a dialogue.

=== 2020 Conference ===
The sixth edition of MED took place from 25 November to 5 December 2020 and saw the participation of over 40 political leaders in a virtual formart. As part of this event, a panel discussion around shared security and the priorities for EU ation was organized between Italian Foreign Minister Luigi Di Maio, French Foreign Minister Jean-Yves Le Drian, Spanish Foreign Minister Arancha González Laya, German Minister of State Niels Annen, and Poland's Deputy Minister of Foreign Affairs Marcin Przydacz. Another memorable and important moment of the conference was when Saudi Arabia's Foreign Minister, Prince Faisal bin Farhan Al Saud, said during a session that a resolution to end the four-year dispute with Qatar was "within reach" and making "significant progress."
