= Guglielmo Oberdan =

Italian failed assassin (1858–1882)

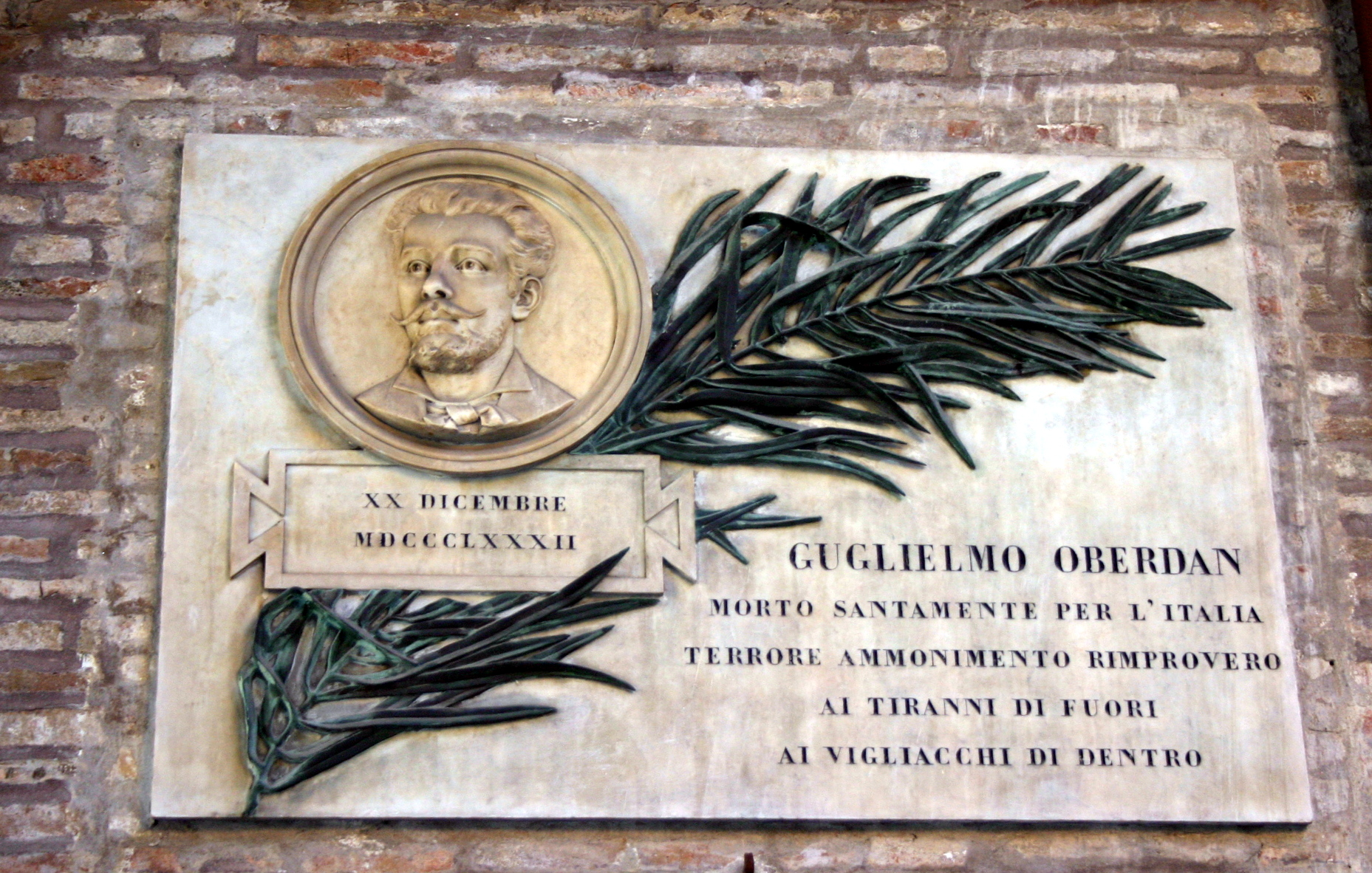
Memorial plaque to Oberdan in Bologna.

Guglielmo Oberdan (1 February 1858 – 20 December 1882) was an Italian irredentist. He was executed after a failed attempt to assassinate Austrian Emperor Franz Joseph, becoming a martyr of the Italian unification movement.

== Biography ==
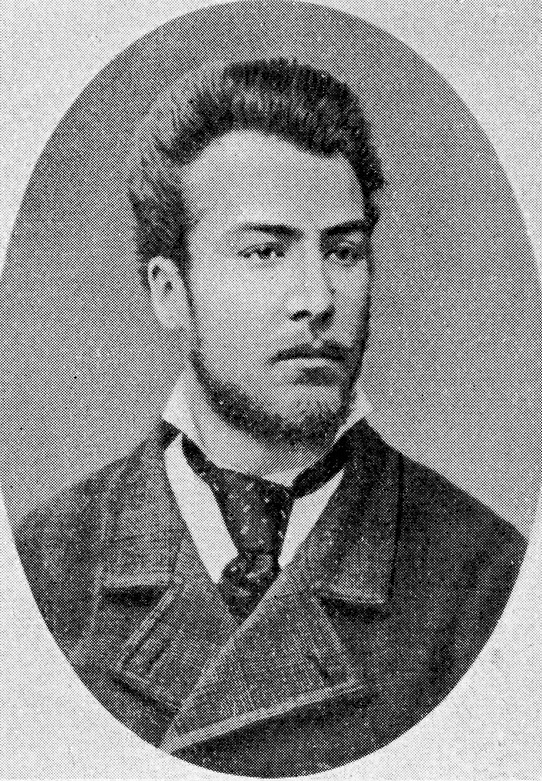
Guglielmo Oberdan

He was born in the city of Trieste, at the time the Austrian Imperial Free City of Trieste. Oberdan was baptized Dionisio Guglielmo Carlo. His first name was that of his grandfather. Guglielmo was indeed his second name, given to him in honour of his godfather, Guglielmo Rossi. His mother was a Slovene woman from Šempas (Italian: Sambasso, German: Schönpass) in the County of Gorizia and Gradisca, while his father, Valentino Falcier, was a Venetian soldier in the Austrian army (though in the civil registers of Trieste he is indicated as a baker). The original form of his mother's surname was Oberdank (or Oberdanch), later Italianized by Guglielmo Oberdan himself into Oberdan. Oberdan's biographer reports that it is only through the latter form that during the years some Slovenian nationalists have claimed him as of "their own blood". His father was originally from Noventa di Piave; he lived his last years in Venice, where he died in 1878. He did not acknowledge his son, so Guglielmo took his mother's surname. He was raised by his mother and stepfather, Francesco Ferencich (Slovene) whom his mother married when Oberdan was four years old. There were some rumors that his stepfather mistreated him, which are dismissed by Oberdan's biographer Francesco Salata, who instead remarks on their good relationship, reporting that his stepfather made no distinction between Oberdan and his other sons, with Oberdan calling him babbo and writing him affectionate letters during his stay in Rome, and stating in his last letter from prison before execution that the visit of his stepfather was of "great consolation", in addition to thanking him for everything.

He was educated in an Italian cultural milieu, embraced irredentist ideas and Italianized his name to "Guglielmo Oberdan". In 1877 he enrolled at Vienna's College of Technology (now Vienna University of Technology) where he studied engineering. As he supported the idea of independence for all of the empire's national groups he resented the occupation of Bosnia-Herzegovina by Austria-Hungary and therefore deserted from the Austro-Hungarian Army because he did not want to take part in military activities there. Instead, he fled to Rome to continue his studies. In the Italian capital he adopted irredentist ideas, aiming at the annexation to Italy of the Italian-speaking lands still under Austro-Hungarian rule. In 1882 he met with irredentist leader and co-founder Matteo Renato Imbriani. It was then that he came to the conviction that only radical acts of martyrdom could bring the liberation of Trieste from Austrian rule.

== Assassination attempt ==
In the same year, Emperor Franz Joseph was planning a visit to Trieste as part of the celebration of the 500th anniversary of Habsburg rule. Although the city had earned itself the honorific title of urbs fidelissima ("most faithful city") for its non-participation in the revolutions of the 1840s, the city was nonetheless a hotbed for Italian irredentists. The ceremonies were accompanied by anti-Austrian demonstrations. At this opportunity, Oberdan and Istrian pharmacist Donato Ragosa plotted an assassination attempt on the emperor. Oberdan's attempt failed, as he was arrested in Ronchi shortly after crossing the border into Austrian territory. The arrest was made possible thanks to two Austrian informers within the irredentist movement of which Oberdan was a prominent exponent. although there another theory that Italian irredentist have betrayed Oberdan to Austrian authority because of his Slovenian origin. After his arrest, Oberdan initially provided a false name (Guglielmo Rossi, the name of his godfather) and insisted he was not Guglielmo Oberdan. According to Salata, this was not done out of cowardice but in order to protect his family and companion.

Oberdan was arrested and sentenced to hang by an Austrian court. His mother, Victor Hugo, and Giosuè Carducci appealed for clemency – but in vain. The death sentence was pronounced because of Oberdan's own admission that he planned to assassinate the Emperor. Without this confession he would've spared his life. According to Salata, Oberdan's plan was to provide Italy with a martyr for the cause the irredent Trieste, with the assassination attempt as a means to obtain this. With the assassination attempt failed, and imprisonment preventing him from action, he resorted to accuse himself to fulfill his purpose, "perhaps he himself blessing destiny, which had determined that his martyrdom would remain purest and that the only blood to be shed would be his own". The condemned Oberdan refused all religious rites, stating "I am a mathematician and a freethinker, and do not believe in the immortality of the soul". Just before the execution, he cried "Viva l'Italia!" (Long live Italy!), which helped establish his later reputation as a martyr of the Italian national cause. Statues of him were erected in towns and cities throughout unified Italy.

Emperor Franz Joseph, who reigned for another 35 years, never visited Trieste again.

The subsequent assassination of Archduke Franz Ferdinand in 1914, and the revival of irredentism that followed, harked back to Oberdan's earlier attempt.

== Responsibility for previous attack and murder ==
During the time of Oberdan's process and in the following years there was debate regarding Oberdan's responsibility for a previous incident occurred in Trieste on 2 August of the same year (1882). At 9 PM, during a parade of the Austro-Hungarian veterans, an unidentified individual threw a bomb between the last row of the marching band and the first row of the procession, injuring 15 people and killing one, Angelo Stocchi, a 15-year old Triestine who was standing at the corner on the other side of the road and was fatally hit by a splinter. The bomb (model Orsini) used in this attack was of the same model as those found in the possession of Oberdan at the time of his arrest. Oberdan was present in Trieste at the time of this incident, as witnessed by the landlord of the hotel Alla città di Vienna, where he sojourned, as well as her daughter, a pedlar who saw him pass by and, with less certainty, a porter of the hotel. Oberdan camouflaged himself as a German, communicating with the landlord in the German language as well. Oberdan was deemed responsible by the Martial Court three months later, after his arrest at Ronchi. Oberdan's responsibility for this attack was confirmed in Irredentist circles (though this might've also happened to protect other people). In the diary of the sisters Ongaro, daughters of Luigi Ongaro, it is reported that the bomb was thrown by a certain Adela Delfino, sister of a classmate of Oberdan, who was allegedly in love with him, and who had been in the apartment where Oberdan sojourned in the night between 1 and 2 August together with Oberdan and perhaps Leopoldo Contento as well as the waitress stopped in Ljubljana. It was determined that the bomb was launched not from the sidewalk but from the window of a building (first floor of number 9 in the contrada of the Corso), out of which a young man with reddish beard and hat sulle ventitré was seen hurry away. The first suspect was a certain Leopoldo Contento, who had a striking resemblance to Oberdan. A girl, stopped with a knife in Ljubljana, who was employed by a family living at number 9 of the contrada of the Corso, was later suspected. Also this suspect was quickly dropped and Oberdan became the chief suspect. Fifteen days later, the Austrian police, following a report by the Italian police, seized on board of the steamer Milano a suitcase filled with subversive pamphlets, Orsini bombs and firecrackers. Three Irredentists were suspected in the suitcase case, but this was ultimately dropped after the "catch-all" execution of Oberdan on 20 December. In 1890 (years after Oberdan's martyrdom) the documentation of the investigation of the 2 August attack and that of the first interrogation of Oberdan were stolen from the poorly surveiled archive of the court of Trieste. These documents were then sent to Udine into a suitcase with double bottom. They remained hidden until after the First World War, when Oberdan's biographer Francesco Salata started to write his biography Oberdan. No evidence condemning Oberdan emerged from the uncovered documents, however, it is not excluded that some part of the documentation was "lost". Still, Salata reports that a guard initially stated that he could claim "almost with certainty that the man who hurried away from that building on 2 August was Oberdan". This guard however later retracted on his statement saying it was made "by way of probability not of certainty". Another guard, who was present, excluded that the individual could be Oberdan. Oberdan was made pass before six witnesses from the 2 August incident, who all excluded that the individual seen on the scene could be Oberdan.

== Legacy ==
The "hymn to Oberdan" was one of the most beloved battle hymns chanted by Italians during WW1. According to Salata "in the name of Oberdan, Irredentism was acknowledged as the 'undertaker of the Triple Alliance'", with the Irredentist mortgage on Italian interests in Habsburg lands that Austria thought to have "annulled with the Triple Alliance" being resurrected the same year (of the signing of the Triple Alliance) by the martyrdom of Oberdan.. The song's melody was used in the WW2 song Stornelli Legionari, which is a pro-fascist, anti-monarchy and anti-armistice song of the Italian Social Republic.

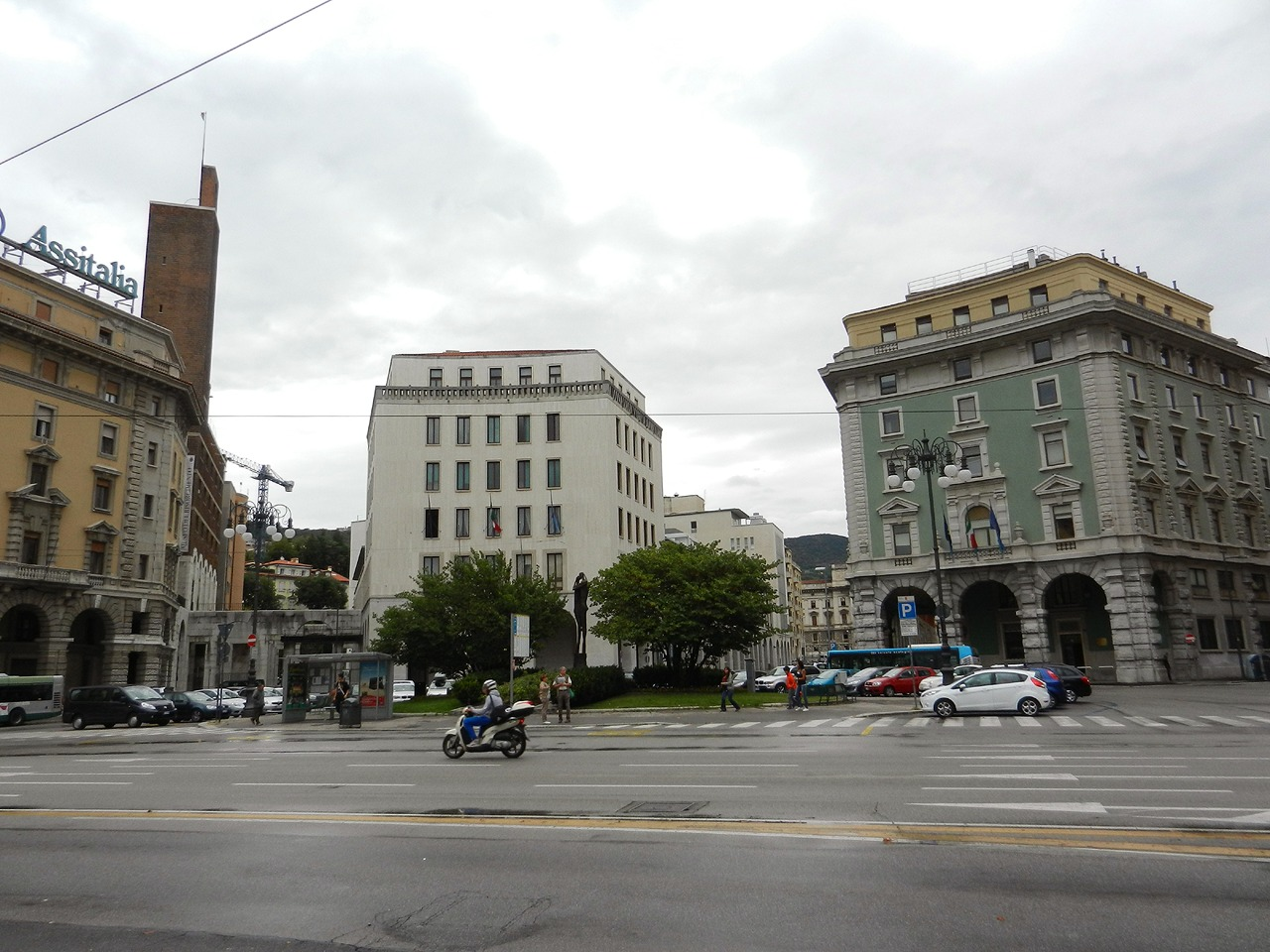
Piazza Oberdan in Trieste

Various prominent monuments in Italy celebrate Oberdan. In Trieste, one of the central squares carries his name (Piazza Oberdan). In Florence, his name is inscribed in the Obelisk of the Fallen in the Wars of Independence in the square in front of Santa Maria Novella.

The Slovene writer Boris Pahor wrote a novel with that title, in which he incorporated the events from Oberdan's life. The Italian writer Enzo Bettiza also depicted Oberdan in his novel "The Ghost of Trieste", under the fictitious name of Stefano Nardenk (Narden).

A film adaptation of Oberdan's life was produced in 1915 by Tiber films of Rome. It starred Alberto Collo as Oberdan and was directed by Emilio Ghione, who also played the role of the governor of Trieste. It was one of a number of patriotic, irredentist films produced in Italy during World War One. Emilio Ghione met the irredentist Gabriele D'Annunzio at an invitational showing of the film in Rome and Ghione's inter-titles were praised by D'Annunzio.

In 1924 Francesco Salata published his extensive and well-documented work on Oberdan Guglielmo Oberdan secondo gli atti segreti del processo: carteggi diplomatici e altri documenti inediti, which, however, is to some extent influenced by the mindset of the Fascist regime.

John Gatt-Rutner, biographer of the Trieste writer Italo Svevo, suggests that Svevo – 21 years old at the time of Oberdan's execution – was deeply affected by it. In the aftermath, Svevo started writing regularly for the Trieste Irredentist paper L'Indipendente. He never mentioned Oberdan explicitly – the paper was heavily censored and the Austrian authorities considered any manifestation of sympathy for Oberdan as treason. However, on 21 January 1884, Svevo published a translation of Ivan Turgenev's story "The Worker and the Man with the White Hands", whose protagonist is sent to the gallows for a rebellious act on behalf of the oppressed; Svevo added the remark that "What is really moving is not the death of the man with the white hands, but his self-sacrifice on behalf of people who are unable to appreciate it." Gatt-Rutner states that "Triestines could not miss the allusion to Oberdan, which clearly demonstrates the light in which [Svevo] viewed the matter".

== Sources ==
- Salata, Francesco (1932). Oberdan. Mondadori.
