= Institute for International Political Studies =

Think tank based in Milan, Italy

ISPI
- Istituto per gli Studi di Politica Internazionale
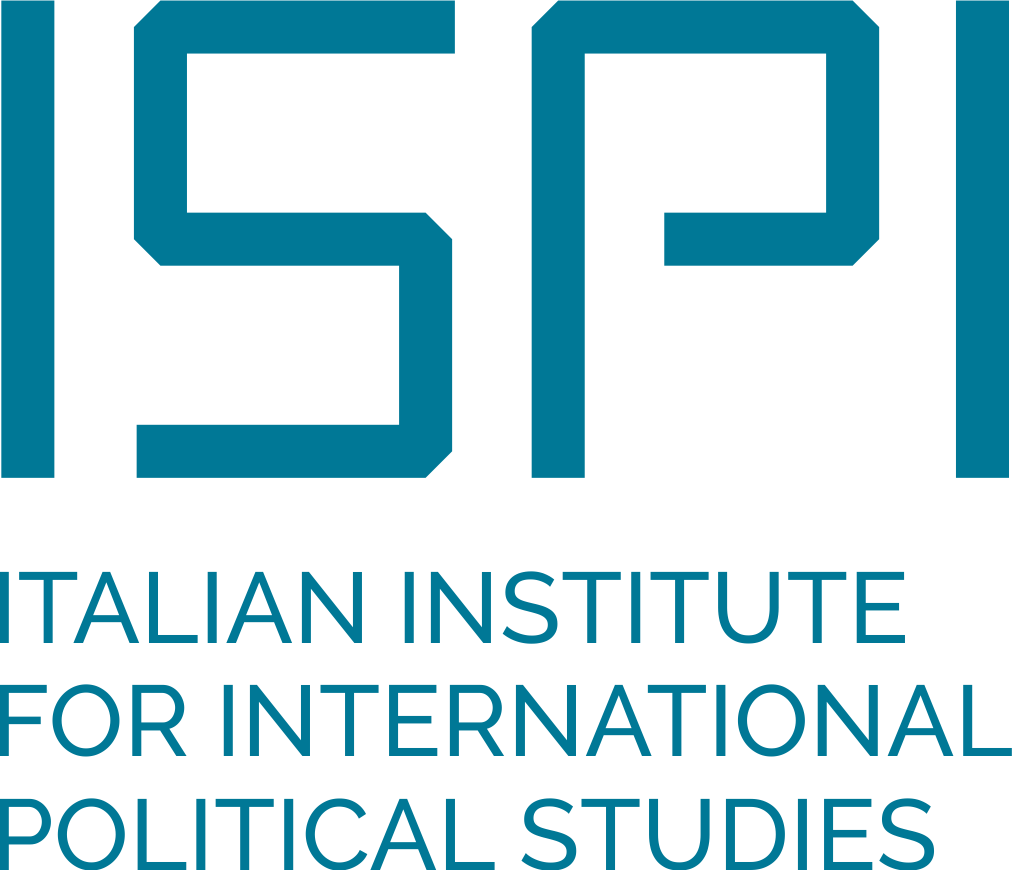
- Established: 1934
- President: Ambassador Mariangela Zappia
- Administrative staff: 70
- Students: 1,500
- Postgraduates: 70 (in two master's courses)
- Location: Milan, Italy
- Website: ispionline.it (in English)

The Institute for International Political Studies (Istituto per gli Studi di Politica Internazionale, ISPI), founded in 1934, is the oldest think tank in Italy. It offers diploma and postgraduate education specializing in international relations. ISPI approaches international affairs in a sound pragmatic manner, monitoring geopolitical areas as well as major global trends. Comprehensive interdisciplinary analysis is ensured by close collaboration with specialists, academic and non-academic, in political, economic, legal, historical and strategic studies and an ever-growing network of think tanks, research centers and universities in Europe and abroad. Its headquarters are in Palazzo Clerici, a splendid example of 18th-century Milanese patrician building which boasts among its treasures the famous room with a Tiepolo fresco.

The Institute's activities branch out in four major directions: research, publications, career training and organizations of events. ISPI is an impartial scientific benchmark for all those interested in international issues: from members of the political and cultural worlds to operators in the business community, public administrations, international bodies and non governmental organisations.

The 2015 Global Go to Think Tank Index Report, edited by the Think Tanks & Civil Societies Program (TTCSP) of the University of Pennsylvania, reaffirmed the Institute for International Political Studies (ISPI) as one of the Top Think Tanks worldwide. In the broadest and most prestigious category "Top Think Tanks Worldwide – US and non-US", ISPI climbed 42 places, thus resulting the 1st Italian Think Tank. ISPI also ranks 1st, among Italian think tanks, in other 15 categories, including "Top Defense and National Security", "Top International Economics" and "Best Policy Study/Report".

In addition, ISPI ranks 3rd worldwide in the category "Think Tanks to Watch"; ranks 4th worldwide among "Think Tanks with Annual Operating Budgets of Less than $5 Million USD" and in the "Best Managed Think Tank" category; ranks 7th worldwide in the "Best Think Tank Conference" for Rome Med - Mediterranean Dialogues and "Best Think Tank Network" categories; and ranks among the top 10 think tanks worldwide in 7 categories. From 2013, ISPI represents Italy at the T20 Summits, the official gathering of the G20 countries' most prominent think tanks.

== History ==
ISPI's activities were officially launched on 27 March 1934 by a group of young scholars from the Universities of Milan and Pavia who, taking into consideration the strong international presence that characterized our country during those years, and inspired by the examples of London's Royal Institute of Foreign Affairs and New York's Foreign Policy Association, proposed to endow fascist Italy with a centre of studies focused on foreign politics. The Institute began its editorial activities from the very first year but to sustain such a rapid development it was immediately necessary to look for a conspicuous source of funds. This came about through the meeting in February 1935 with Alberto Pirelli, the second son of the founder of the Pirelli company itself. It was due to the efforts of Alberto Pirelli that the concession was obtained from Mussolini to have the headquarters in Palazzo Clerici. After an inevitable interruption due to the military occupation and uncertainties following the liberation, ISPI was able to resume its activities in 1949. Starting from the 1950s, it organized each year a postgraduate course for young people aiming to embark on a diplomatic career or work in the sphere of international economics and politics.

== Clerici Palace ==
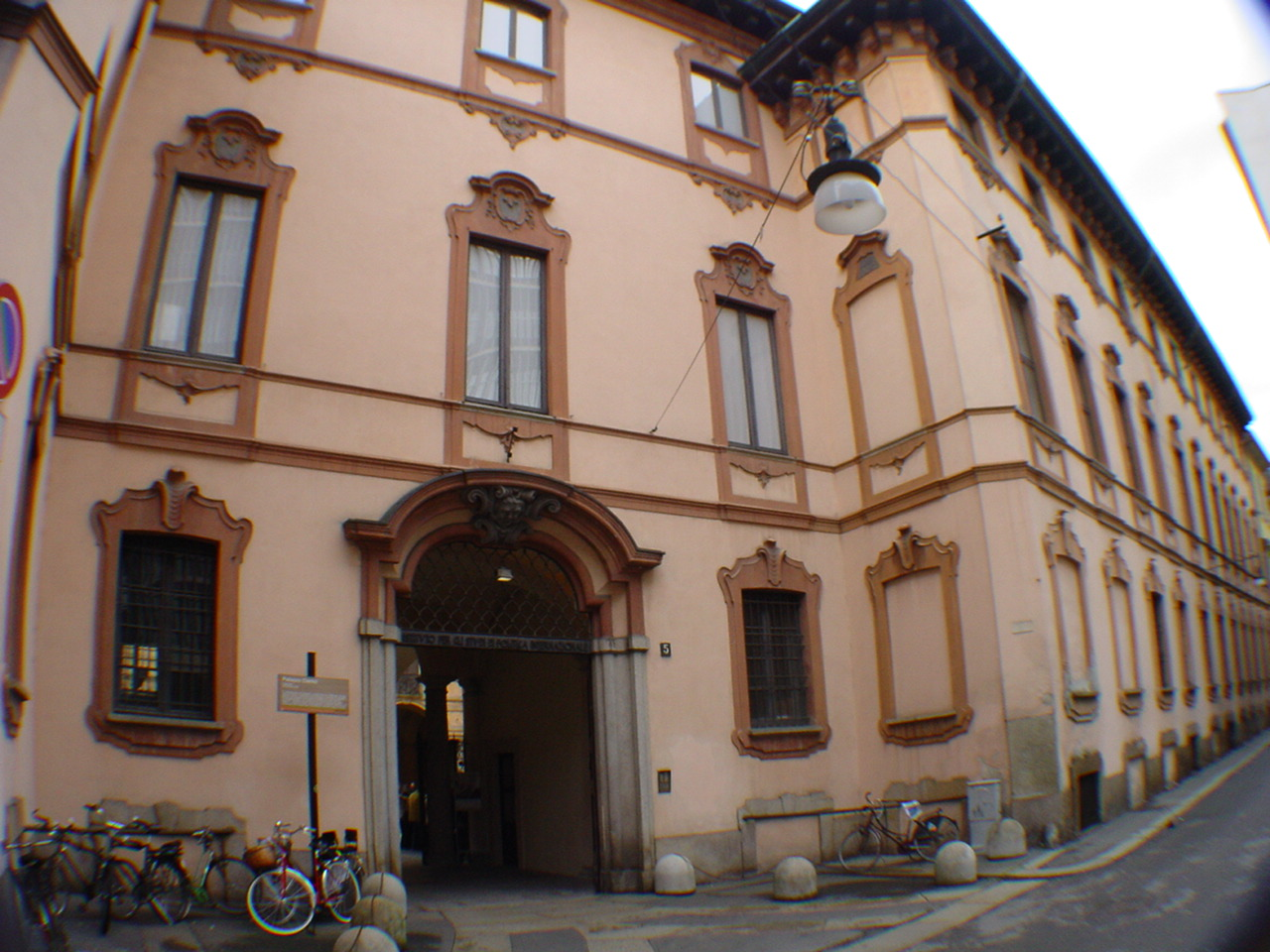
The Clerici Palace

Located in the heart of the city, in a district known in the 17th century as the "Contrada del prestino (oven) dei Bossi", Clerici Palace firstly belonged to Battista Visconti and was bought by the Clerici's, a family of silk merchants and bankers from the Como Lake, only towards the middle of 1600 (about 1653).

The Austrians, indeed, entrusted the Ducat's internal governance to Clerici's Family, who therefore needed a mansion house in Milan and the palace subsequently became one of the most sumptuous, luxurious residences in the city. In 1740 Giorgio Antonio Clerici asked Giambattista Tiepolo to crown his success and achievements by frescoing the main room of his palace. Upon his death, Palazzo Clerici passed into the hands of a secondary branch of the family; it is in this period, to be precisely between 1773 and 1778, that Archduke Ferdinand of Austria lived here, while he waited for Palazzo Reale to be finished. The names of some of the most sumptuous and richly decorated rooms, like the Boudoir and Maria Theresa's bedroom, can be dated to these years.

After Napoleon's fall it was ceded to the Austrian government and became the seat of the Court of Appeal in 1862. Finally, in 1942 it was handed over to ISPI, the Institute of International Political Studies, and the Institute is still today located here.

== Research ==
The traditional aim of ISPI research is to survey the political, strategic and economic trends in the international system. The core research section contains the final publication of projects conducted by ISPI at times jointly with other institutes. The results of ISPI research projects are circulated in the quarterly Ispi-Relazioni Internazionali, which also publishes previews and synopses as well as in a series on international issues entitled Policy Brief.

Research activity at the Institute is organized by Centres (Asia; Cybersecurity; Europe and Global Governance; Business Scenarios; Middle East and North Africa; Radicalization and International Terrorism; Russia, Caucasus and Central Asia) and Programmes (Africa; Energy Security; Latin America; Migration; Transatlantic Relations). Specific Country Desks are devoted to India and Iran.

== Training ==
In 1950 ISPI started to organise in-depth seminars on international themes. Following an agreement with the Foreign Ministry in 1969, these were then transformed into a year-long course of preparation for the competitive examination leading to a diplomatic career. This experience later led in 1999 to the creation of a master's degree in international affairs designed for those aiming either at entering the diplomatic corps or working in an international field (e.g. international or non governmental organisations).

== Winter/Summer School ==
ISPI's Winter and Summer School offer students, new graduates and young professionals the opportunity to gain an introduction into major international themes through a catalogue of short intensive courses on such subjects as: Development and Cooperation, Humanitarian Emergencies, European affairs, Electoral Assistance, Human Rights Democratization, Geopolitics. More than 130 courses have been offered since 2000, with an overall attendance of more than 4,500 students and young professionals coming from all over Italy and abroad.

Finally, to answer the increasing need for professional up-dating for diplomats already in service, ISPI collaborates with the Diplomatic Institute for the Foreign Ministry in organising teaching modules for the Course of Professional Training for delegation advisors.

== Diploma ==
ISPI currently has active diploma programs.

== Master's degrees ==
ISPI has currently two active master's degrees:

1. Master in Diplomacy
2. Master in International Cooperation (Development & Emergencies).
