= Oberdan =

Book by Italian author and historian Francesco Salata

- Cover of the 1932 edition
- Author: Francesco Salata
- Language: Italian
- Genre: Essay
- Publisher: Mondadori
- Publication date: 1932
- Publication place: Italy
- Pages: 306 (originally 606)

Oberdan is a book by Italian author and historian Francesco Salata, published in 1932 by Mondadori. The book is a reduced edition of Salata's 1924 Guglielmo Oberdan secondo gli atti segreti del processo: carteggi diplomatici e altri documenti inediti. The book was acclaimed upon its release.

== Overview ==
The work is a biographical essay on Guglielmo Oberdan, and it contains previously unpublished documents about the Italian patriot, with documents of the trial recovered by Salata. It is a "leaner" edition of Salata's Guglielmo Oberdan secondo gli atti segreti del processo: carteggi diplomatici e altri documenti inediti, published on 1 January 1924 by Zanichelli. The 1924 edition contains all the documents on which the study was based, as well as Salata's notes, while the 1932 edition is more "popular", and contains just the literary text of the work. Further, the 1932 edition was sold at a reduced price four times inferior to the original edition's, to make the book more accessible to the wide public.

In the book, Salata argues "with arguments that are not very persuasive" that Oberdan (whose mother was Slovenian and father Italian) was a full-blooded Italian because even his mother's family had been Italian for many generations, and that it is unknown whether his ancestors were Slovenian or German. The book is still extensive and well documented, a "ponderous" work considered fundamental among those written on Oberdan. The 606-page book published with Zanichelli in 1924 was acclaimed upon its release, and, as mentioned, in 1932 it was republished in a "leaner" edition by Mondadori. Billed as an essay, the work is much biographical in nature.
