= Zanichelli =

Italian publishing company founded in 1859

- Founded: 1859 in Modena
- Founder: Nicola Zanichelli
- Country of origin: Italy
- Headquarters location: Bologna
- Publication types: Academic books; dictionaries; textbooks
- Revenue: €139,600,000 in 2016
- Official website: www.zanichelli.it

Zanichelli editore S.p.A. is an Italian publishing company founded in Modena, Italy, in 1859.

It publishes mainly textbooks for school, university and professional books (legal texts and medicine), dictionaries, and reference books.

== History ==
The company was founded in Modena in 1859 by Nicola Zanichelli. It has been based in Bologna since 1866. It was the first to translate into Italian Charles Darwin's On the Origin of Species (1864) and Relativity: The Special and the General Theory by Albert Einstein (1921).
