= Luka Kirac =

Croatian nationalist (1860–1931)

- Born: 27 September 1860; Medulin, Austria-Hungary
- Died: 3 January 1931 (aged 70); Rakotule, Kingdom of Italy
- Occupations: Priest, activist, politician, author

Luka Kirac (27 September 1860 – 3 January 1931) was a Croatian Catholic priest, revivalist of Croatian nationalism and right-wing politician.

Kirac was a defender of the rights of Croats and Slovenes in Istria, and played an important part in their struggle for their rights. He emphasized the connection of Istrian Croats with the national motherland, and, as early as during his schooling, was "fascinated by the ideas of national revival and Starčević's orthodoxy." Kirac is said to have equally respected Starčević and Dobrila.

== Biography ==
He was born in Medulin, into a peasant family. Kirac finished elementary school in his native Medulin. He went to high school in Senj and Rijeka, financially supported by Juraj Dobrila, who had first noticed his brightness.

After being ordained a priest, he worked in Poreč. After that, the church authorities moved him to places in southern Istria: to Krnica and Rakalj. He was pastor in Barban for eight years, from 1887 to 1895. There he became interested in the history of the Croats of his region. After Barban he was a pastor in Ližnjan and after that in Medulin. In the elections of 1908, he was elected a member of the Provincial Parliament. This happened when he was still a pastor in his native Medulin. In addition to performing as a priest, during his time in Medulin Kirac also worked on developing national consciousness among the Istrian Croats.

As a politician, he sought a way of reconciliation and cooperation between liberal parties, which distinguished him from some Croatian (and Slovenian) activists for the rights of Croatians and Slovenians in Istria (Božo Milanović, Petar Sironić). As a politician, he maintained the priestly line of reconciliation and care for the poor. He expressed concern for the poor and sick who were dying all over Istria, who were not saved either in the villages or in hospitals, where they were treated inhumanely. Wherever he went, he was remembered as a generous man, who cared for the poor, helped with advice, money, and a kind word. As such, he resented both the Austrian administration and the economically much stronger Istrian Italian citizens. He was president of the Medulin loan office.

At the beginning of the First World War, the Austrian authorities checked his activities. He was first interned, and then put under heightened surveillance. His second internment followed Italy's entry into the war. Thereafter, he didn't even return to Medulin, and shared instead the same fate of the Istrian women, children and elderly, who were moved into the inner part of the Monarchy. The Istrians moved to different places within Austria, and the road took Kirac through Austria, Hungary, the Czech Republic and Moravia.

When the war ended, things got worse for Kirac and the Istrians, whose "feeling of freedom was very quickly replaced by the knowledge of deception:." The differences among different Istrian Croat parties that Kirac had tried to solve extinguished, as fascist terror broke out, which made all political activities impossible, shut down all political media, all national newspapers in Croatian and Slovene.

Immediately after the arrival of the Italian Army, the Italian authorities confined him as a suspicious person in Lipari and then in Sardinia (1919–21). He was then ordered to stay in Rakotule, which he was not allowed to leave, unless the police allowed him to do so. That was the last station of his activity as pastor. In Croatia, it is often recalled the event of 1921, when the locals organized themselves on the agreed bell sign from the bell tower of the church of St. Roko to oppose the fascist attempt to detain Kirac and burn his books. He was exposed to all kinds of fascist abuse. The fascists tried to kill him, his books were burned, and he was saved only by the common people who defended him. Fascist threats did not stop him from working. Around 1925, he discovered wall paintings in the church of St. Nicholas in Rakotule.

Kirac belonged to the group of Istrian revivalists of Croatian national identity, who preserved and protected the Croatian national spirit during the turbulent times of Italianization of Istria. The group included: Matko Brajša, Dinko Trinajstić, Juraj Dobrila, Viktor Car Emin, Ivo Glavina, Antun Kalac, Eugen Kumičić, Ivan Cukon, Šime Kurelić, Matko Laginja, Matko Mandić, Fran Matejčić, Ivan Rendić, Josip Ribarić, Vjekoslav Spinčić, Vinko Šepić, Tone Peruško, Zvane Črnja.

At a young age, he became aware of how facts about Istria were biasedly presented by the local elite, so he embarked on the study of historical material, especially archival material stored in parishes. He studied old documents and read the notes of his predecessor, the Croatian revivalist, municipal leader Josip Batel. Although he was not an educated historian, he proved to be an excellent scholar of history. Topics he wrote about were the immigration of Slavs into the Istrian peninsula, the penetration of the Croatian people into towns and castles, the survival of the culture of the Croatian people, the geographical spread in the villages and more. These were topics that had hitherto been neglected and misrepresented. Unlike the previous practice of historians, Kirac was ahead of his time. Instead of describing the feudal lords, he described the people, broad

He saw that the results of his research would shatter Italian theses and that irredentists would not shy away from destroying historical evidence that did not go in their favor. He already had an unpleasant experience with a fire that destroyed old Croatian documents in the municipality and at the same time destroyed evidence of embezzlement by the Italian municipal administration. Because of that, he secretly smuggled the documents from the parish of his native Medulin to Zagreb, where they were stored in the JAZU Archives. Part of these documents was written in Glagolitic.

Due to all this, his most significant work, Sketches from Istrian History, which is a depiction of the medieval history of Croats on the Istrian peninsula, was not published during his lifetime, but remained in manuscript until after the liberation of Istria in 1946. In his paper, Kirac wrote about the immigration of Croats, the development of feudal society and the culture of the Croatian people.

Kirac was a danger to the Italian authorities even after he died. For his funeral, people flocked to Medulin from everywhere for the last farewell to the beloved local. The fascist authorities perceived his funeral as a provocation. His funeral in his native Medulin, "was a political and social event that proved that the national struggle in Istria was a struggle for human and ethical rights of Croats and that they cannot be silenced and extinguished by any terror."

Today, there is a memorial plaque in Medulin in his memory.

== Sources ==
- I. Mihovilović, Internacija i progon popa Luke Kirca, Kalendar Jurina i Franina, Pula 1973.;
- J. Demarin, Luka Kirac - svjetao lik u povijesti Istre, Istra, 7-8/1974.;
- J. Bratulić, Istarske književne teme, Pula 1987.;
- M. Dabo, Hrvatski narodni preporod, Monografija općine Medulin (ur. Andrej Bader), Medulin 2013., M. Bertoša, Etos i etnos zavičaja, Pula-Rijeka 1985.; * M. Bertoša, Kirac, Luka, Istarska enciklopedija, Zagreb 2005.;
- M. Rojnić, O don Luki i njegovu radu, Crtice iz istarske povijesti (autor Luka Kirac), Pazin 1990. (Zagreb 1946.);
- J. Jelinčić, Dokumenti o don Luki Kircu u Historijskom arhivu Pazin, Pazinski memorijal, 16/1988., br. 1;
- H. Buršić, 223 hrabra potpisa, Monografija općine Medulin (ur. Andrej Bader), Medulin 2013., 220–224;
- I. Žagar, Razvoj turizma u Općini Medulin od konca 19. stoljeća do danas, Monografija Općine Medulin (ur. Andrej Bader), Medulin 2013.;
- Iz Puljštine, Istarska riječ (Trst), 1. 11. 1923.
