= Šime Kurelić =

Croatian politician

Šime Kurelić (1865 – 1921) was a Croatian politician from Pićan and a revivalist of Croatian nationalism among Istrian Croats.

== Life ==
He belonged to a group of prominent Istrians of his day who defended, preserved and protected the Croatian national spirit during the turbulent times of Italianization of Istria. The group included: Juraj Dobrila, Matko Brajša, Viktor Car Emin, Ivan Cukon, Ivo Glavina, Antun Kalac, Luka Kirac, Eugen Kumičić, Matko Laginja, Matko Mandić, Fran Matejčić, Ivan Rendić, Josip Ribarić, Vjekoslav Spinčić, Vinko Šepić, Dinko Trinajstić, Tone Peruško, Zvane Črnja. They were al members of Matica hrvatska.

In 1897 he was the head of the newly established Croatian Reading Room in Pazin. He was the secretary of the Student Support Society from Pazin, chaired by Dinko Trinajstić. In 1901, Kurelić participated in a project to raise money for the construction of a Croatian student dormitory in Pazin, for students of the Pazin Croatian Gymnasium, together with Dinko Trinajstić, trying to obtain financial assistance in Zagreb from the First Croatian Savings Bank. On Strossmayer's instructions, a special committee was established in 1903 with the task of raising funds for the construction of the house, and Kurelić acted as the treasurer in that committee. Other councilors were Vjekoslav Spinčić, Dinko Trinajstić, Antun Kalac, Matko Laginja, Andrija Stanger, Dinko Vitezić, Fran Volarić and Vinko Zamlić. Work began in 1913, according to a project by Benedictine architect Anzelm Werner.

Kurelić rose to the position of mayor of Pazin after Dinko Trinajstić, who had done well before him, raising the municipality to its feet, so that the elite could no longer manipulate the poor Pazin farmers, mostly Croats, during the dry years. Since Trinajstić led the municipality so well that he attracted to his side those who had been indecisive until then, he created such a majority that Kurelić, the mayor who came after him, had such a large base that he was the mayor for two decades until Italy occupied the area in 1918 and imprisoned him.

At the end of the First World War, i.e. after the proclamation of the State of Slovenes, Croats and Serbs to which Istria belonged on 29 October 1918, Kurelić found himself in the National Council of Slovenes, Croats and Serbs, a body whose presidency in Zagreb was the highest authority in the country. Apart from Kurelić, several other Croatian politicians from Istria were in that body: Josip Grašić, Vjekoslav Spinčić, Matko Laginja and Đuro Červar. They were delegated to the Society by the Political Society for Croats and Slovenes in Istria, of which Kurelić was a councilor. Other councilors were Vjekoslav Spinčić, Jakov Buretić from Boljun, Šime Defar from Tinjan, Ferdo Hrdy from Sveti Lovreč Labinski, Kazimir Jelušić from Kastav, Ivo Lovrić from Mali Lošinj, Franjo Pučić from Žminj, Mate Sanković from Dana, Gaspar Živković from Bačva, Viktor Marotti from Marčani, Anton Antončić from Krk, Đuro Červar from Pula, Fran Flego from Buzet, Fran Grunt from Novak, Konrad Janežič from Volosko, Liberat Sloković from Sveti Petar u Šumi, Dinko Trinajstic from Pazin and Ivan Cukon (Zuccon) from Pula. He was a member of the Croatian parliament in the Istrian Parliament in 1909.

In those days, people's government bodies, odbori Narodnoga vijeća (committees of the People's Council), were established. These committees in Istria took over power in municipalities that had a Croat and Slovene majority. In Kurelić's town of Pazin, such a committee was established on 29 October 1918, and was chaired by Šime Kurelić himself.
