= Frankovići =

Hamlet in Croatia

- Hamlet
- Location within Croatia
- Coordinates: 45.169647°N 13.798889°E
- Country: Croatia
- County: Istria County
- Municipality: Tinjan
- Time zone: UTC+1 (CET)
  - Summer (DST): UTC+2 (CEST)
- Postal code: 52444 Tinjan
- Area code: 052

Frankovići is a hamlet within the Radetići settlement of the Tinjan municipality in Istria County, Croatia.

Frankovići is situated nearby to the hamlets Ribari and Terlevići.

It is located between Sveti Lovreč to the west and Kringa to the east.
