= Antun Kalac =

Antun Kalac, late 19th century

Antun Kalac (27 December 1849 – 13 May 1919) was a Croatian poet, writer, playwright, literary translator, and revivalist of Croatian nationalism among the Istrian people. He was also a Catholic priest.

== Early life ==
Kalac was born in the village of Žbrlini in the region of Pazin, where he attended elementary school, followed by lower grammar school with the Franciscans. He attended high school in Trieste before studying at a seminary in Gorizia and Trieste.

In Trieste, he came into contact with a group of Croatian intellectuals associated with the magazine Naša Sloga.

== Career ==
Kalac became a priest in Pazin in 1875 and was a chaplain there until 1882. He supported the Croatian people through his work and came into conflict with Italian political supporters. Since the diocese of Trieste, which at that time included Pazin and other parts of central Istria, was headed by the Istrian revivalist Bishop Juraj Dobrila, Kalac was able to continue his work in the region. In 1882, he was transferred to Buzet as pastor and dean. In 1906, he returned to Pazin and took an appointment as prefect and dean. His Croatian revivalist work was well-received. He promoted Croatian education and defended the national rights of Croats in Istria. As a result of his work, he was constantly attacked by the ruling elite.

Kalac was well known for his position as a defender and protector of the Croatian national spirit during the Italianization of Istria. Because he was a high-ranking priest within the Catholic Church, he did not hold the most prominent positions in civic associations, but his contribution to these circles was still significant.

Kalac also contributed to the development of Croatian poetic expression in Istria during the 19th and 20th centuries. He published about a hundred songs in Naša sloga, often under the pseudonym Nadan Zorin. He also published prose and wrote plays. His songs reflected his commitment to Croatia; one song in particular, "Predobri Bože", was once considered the anthem of Istrian Croats. He translated literary works from various languages into Croatian, including Schiller's "Song of the Bell" and Virgil's Eclogues.

He was also the editor of a memorial book published on the 100th anniversary (1912) of the birth of the Croatian revivalist Bishop Juraj Dobrila.

Kalac died on 13 May 1919 in Pazin.

== Sources ==
- Pregled bibliografske jedinice broj: 60965 Mirjana Strčić: Antun Kalac – hrvatski narodni preporoditelj i pjesnik
- Grad Pula Nova Istra, časopis za književnost, kulturološke i društvene teme. Prilozi o zavičaju. Crkva sv. Nikole u Pazinu (I) – Pazinska prepozitura i prepoziti. Piše Josip Šiklić, Pazin.
- Vjekoslav Spinčić, Crtice iz hrvatske književne kulture Istre, Zagreb 1926.
- Vjekoslav Kalac, Antun Kalac – istarski pjesnik rodoljub, Istarska Danica 1973.
- Božo Milanović, Hrvatski narodni preporod u Istri, II, Pazin 1973.
- Mirijana Strčić, Istarska beseda i pobuna, II, Pula 1985.
- Josip Bratulić, Antun Kalac, pjesnik Istre, u: A. Kalac – Pjesme, Pazin 1992.
- M. Strčić, Pjesničko djelo Antuna Kalca, u: Temelji književne epohe, Svećenici u hrvatskom narodnom preporodu Istre i kvarnerskih otoka, Pazin 1994.
- Boris Biletić, Antun Kalac i njegov hrvatski prepjev Rapicijeve poeme »Histria«, Umjetnost riječi, 2002., 1–2
