= Jure Grando =

Croatian villager, first person historically described as a vampire

Jure Grando Alilović or Giure Grando (1578–1656) was a villager from the region of Istria (in modern-day Croatia) who may have been the first real person described as a vampire in historical records. He was referred to as a štrigon, a local word for something resembling a vampire and a warlock. He was a stonemason, and had two children, Ana and Nikola, with his wife Ivana.

== History ==
Jure Grando lived in Kringa, a small town in the interior of the Istrian peninsula near Tinjan. He died in 1656 due to illness but according to legend, returned from the grave at night as a vampire (štrigon) and terrorized his village until his decapitation in 1672. Ana and Nikola Alilović, daughter and son of Jure, fled from Istria to Volterra, Italy, at young ages.

The word štrigon in Venetian, which is commonly spoken in Istria, means sorcerer, cf. Italian stregone.

== Legend ==
The legend tells that, for 16 years after his death, Jure would arise from his grave by night and terrorize the village. The village priest, named Giorgio, who had buried Jure sixteen years previously discovered that at night, somebody would knock on the doors around the village and on whichever door he knocked, someone from that house would die within the next few days.

Jure also appeared to his terrified widow Ivana in her bedroom, who described the corpse as looking as though he was smiling and gasping for breath and would then sexually assault her. When Father Giorgio eventually came face to face with the vampire, he held out a cross in front of him and yelled "Behold Jesus Christ, you vampire! Stop tormenting us!"

The bravest of the villagers, led by the prefect Miho Radetić, chased and tried to kill the vampire by piercing his heart with a stick of hawthorn but failed because the stick just bounced off of his chest. One night later, nine people went to the graveyard, carrying lamps, a cross, and a hawthorn stick. They dug up Jure's coffin and found a perfectly preserved corpse with a smile on its face. Father Giorgio said: "Look, štrigon, there is Jesus Christ who saved us from hell and died for us. And you, štrigon, you cannot have peace!" They then tried to pierce his heart again, but the stick could not penetrate its flesh.

After some prayers of exorcism, Stipan Milašić (one of the villagers) sawed the head off the corpse. As soon as the saw tore his skin, the vampire screamed, and blood started to flow from the cut. According to folklore, peace did finally return to the region after Jure's decapitation.

== Writings ==
The Carniolan scientist Johann Weikhard von Valvasor wrote about Jure Grando Alilović's life and afterlife in his extensive work The Glory of the Duchy of Carniola when he visited Kringa during his travels. This was the first written document on vampires. Grando was also mentioned in writings by Erasmus Francisci and Johann Joseph von Goerres (La mystique divine, naturelle, et diabolique, Paris, 1855), whose story was much more elaborate, full of fantastic details to make the story more interesting and sensational. In modern times, Croatian writer Boris Perić has researched the legend and written a book (The Vampire) on the story.

== Modern times ==
Today, Kringa has embraced the story of Jure Grando Alilović and have opened up a vampire themed bar aimed at attracting tourists to the town. The Juraj Dobrila gymnasium in Pazin created a short film called "Vampire of My Homeland" (Vampir moga zavičaja) based on the writings of Valvasor.

The folklore related to the štrigon has recently been documented and examined by numerous scientists at the University of Zagreb.
