= Augustineum =

Augustineum may refer to:

- Augustineum Secondary School, Windhoek, Namibia (previously also in Otjimbingwe and Okahandja)
- Augustineum, Vienna, Austria
