= Matko Mandić =

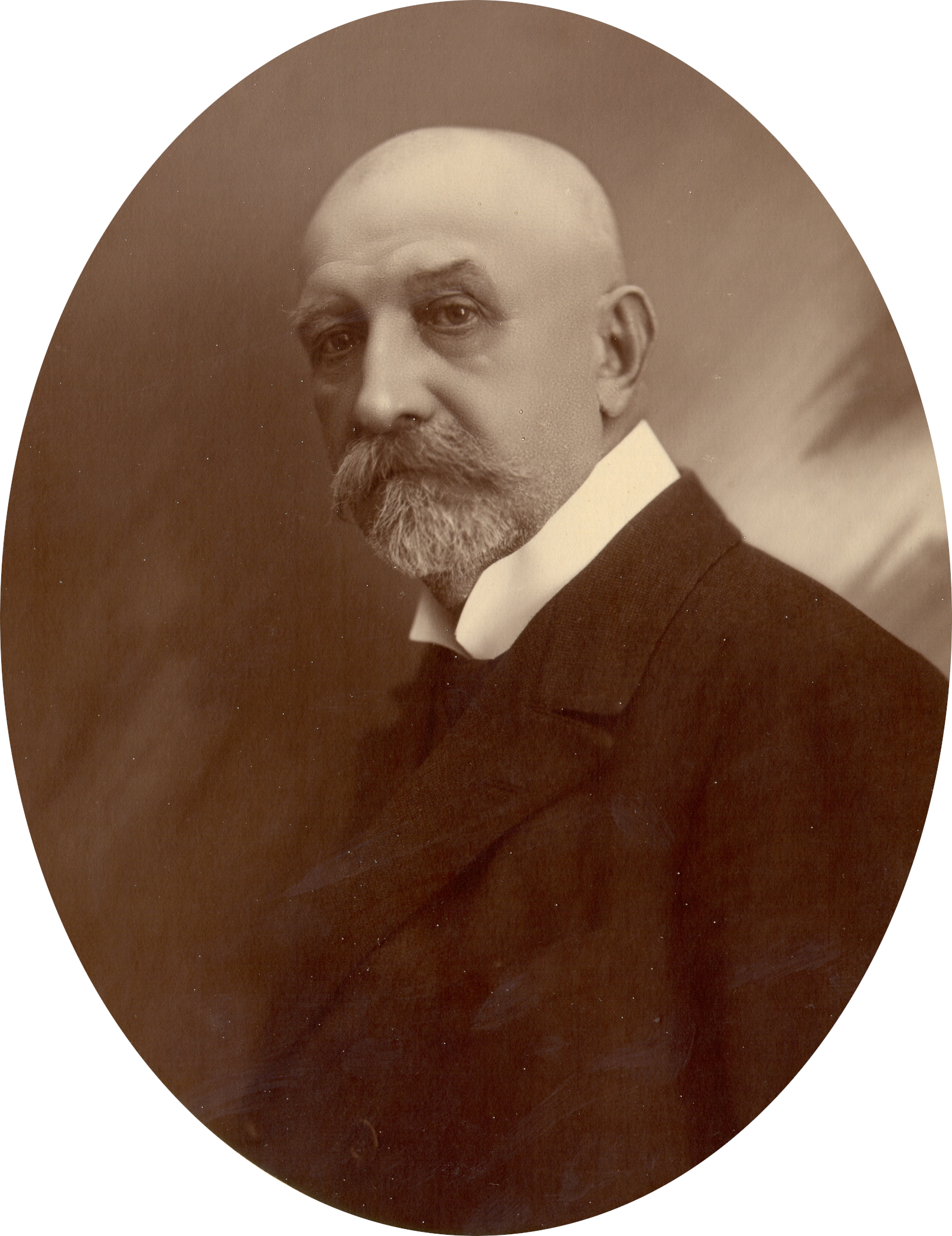
- Matko Radić

Personal details
- Born: 22 September 1849 Mihotići, Austria-Hungary
- Died: 13 May 1915 (aged 65) Trieste, Austria-Hungary
- Party: Croatian Party of Rights
- Relatives: Ante Mandić (nephew); Josip Mandić (nephew)
- Occupation: Politician

Matko Mandić (22 September 1849 – 13 May 1915), was a Catholic priest and Croatian nationalist politician.

Born in Mihotići near Kastav, he studied theology in Gorizia and Trieste, and natural sciences in Prague. He was a member of the so-called second generation of Croatian revivalists of Istria. From 1883 to 1900 he was the editor-in-chief of the Croatian newspaper Naša sloga in Trieste, where in 1907 he founded the first Croatian daily (Balkan). He was one of the main founders of the Party of Rights in Istria, with Matko Laginja and Vjekoslav Spinčić. From 1889 until his death (in Trieste) he was elected a member of the Istrian Parliament; In 1907 and 1911 he was elected a member of the Imperial Council in Vienna.

Mandić was the uncle of composer Josip Mandić and politician Ante Mandić.
