= Josip Mandić =

Croatian composer and lawyer (1883–1959)

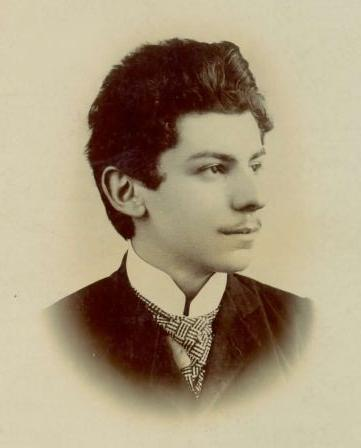
- Born: 4 April 1883; Trieste, Austrian Littoral, Austria-Hungary
- Died: 4 October 1959 (aged 76); Prague, Czechoslovakia
- Other name: Josef Mandić
- Education: University of Vienna; Vienna Conservatory
- Occupations: Lawyer, composer
- Relatives: Ante Mandić (brother); Matko Mandić (uncle)

Josip Mandić or Josef Mandić (4 April 1883 – Prague, 4 October 1959) was a lawyer and a composer of Croat descent.

== Biography ==
Mandić was born on 4 April 1883 in Trieste, Austria-Hungary (today in Italy). He graduated law from the University of Vienna in 1906. He also attended the Vienna Conservatory, taught by Hermann Graedener and Robert Fuchs. Mandić returned to native Trieste, opened a law office there, and became involved in politics as a political ally of Dinko Trinajstić. During the World War I, he became a member of the Yugoslav Committee, an ad-hoc group of politicians and activists advocating unification of the South Slavs and dissolution of Austria-Hungary. After the war, Mandić stayed in Switzerland until 1923 when he moved to Prague, Czechoslovakia where he practised law and wrote music again. He died on 4 October 1959 in Prague, at the age of 76.

Mandić composed approximately 20 pieces of music including:

- Croatian Mass (1897)
- Slaven and song (cantata, 1902)
- Petar Svačić (opera on libretto by Karlo Lukež, 1903)
- Orchestral suite (1905)
- String Quartet (1927)
- Night Journey (symphonic poem, 1928)
- Four symphonies (1929, 1930, 1953, and 1954)
- Wind Quintet (1930)
- Three Ballads (1932)
- Mirjana (opera, 1937)
- Captain Niko (opera, 1944)
- Variations on a Mozart Theme (1956)

Mandić was a nephew of politician and publicist Matko Mandić, and the younger brother of lawyer and politician Ante Mandić.
