= Medulin Loan Bank =

Croatian cooperative savings and loan institution

- Industry: Banking
- Headquarters: Croatia

The Medulin Loan Bank, was a Croatian cooperative savings and loan institution from Medulin, in Istria.

== History ==
The cooperative, which sought to improve the economic situation in Istria, also operated as part of the Croatian national revival in Istria. Also, other companies with the same purpose were established in Istria. They were organized on cooperative principles under the 1884 Act.

The Medulin loan company was founded in 1898, in order to help the peasants to obtain more favorable loans for the repayment of debts, and to obtain machines and other tools necessary for cultivating the land. Antun Žmak worked as a secretary and treasurer. The president was Luka Kirac. The loan office operated in the area of the villages of Ližnjan and Šišan.

After the First World War, with the passage of Istria from Austria to Italy, the Italian authorities obstructed its work, and in 1928 it was liquidated.

== See also ==
- List of banks in Croatia
