= Naša sloga =

Naša sloga was the first newspaper in Istria in the Croatian language.

== History ==
The newspaper began to be published in Trieste on June 1, 1870, as a four-page small-format biweekly until 1884, from 1884 to 1900 as a weekly. In the meantime, in 1899, they moved from Trieste. The paper was initiated by Bishop Juraj Dobrila, and was conceived by Matko Baštijan, Antun Karabaić, Mate Ujčić and Tomislav Padavić. The subtitle read Poučni, gospodarski i politički list ("Educational, Economic and Political Journal"), and underneath it was the motto Slogom rastu male stvari, a nesloga sve pokvari ("Harmony grows small things, but discord spoils everything"). It was an intimation to collaboration between Slovenians and Croatians in Istria.

Since October 25, 2007, it is possible to search the newspaper "Naša sloga" (Trieste, Pula, 1870-1915), the first Croatian newspaper in Istria, for free on the website of the University Library in Pula.

After Karabaić, the editors-in-chief were Andrija Novak, Lovro Testen, Karlo Kiršjak and Matko Mandić.

== Other releases with the same name ==
From 1928 to 1932 in Sušak, and briefly in 1935 in Karlovac, other newspapers of the same name were published. Their editor and publisher was Milan Banić.

From February 17, 1938 until 1944, a weekly of the same name was published in Buenos Aires and edited by Joso Defrančeski. This Naša sloga was subtitled glasilo jugoslovenskih iseljenika u državama Južne Amerike ("the newsletter of Yugoslav emigrants in the countries of South America", and was financially supported by the Embassy of the Kingdom of Yugoslavia in Buenos Aires.
