= Starcevich =

Starcevich is a Croatian surname. It is patronymic from the words starac, meaning ″old man″ or ″elder.″ Notable people with this surname include:

- Brandon Starcevich (born 1999), Australian rules footballer
- Craig Starcevich (born 1967), Australian rules footballer
- Max Starcevich (1911–1990), American football guard
- Tom Starcevich (1918–1989), Victoria Cross recipient

== See also ==
- Starčević
