= Brečevići =

Brečevići Brecovici
- Village
- Location within Croatia
- Coordinates: 45.2211638°N 13.7888161°E
- Country: Croatia
- County: Istria County
- Municipality: Tinjan

Area
  - Total: 1.5 sq mi (3.9 km^{2})

Population (2021)
  - Total: 182
  - Density: 120/sq mi (47/km^{2})
- Time zone: UTC+1 (CET)
  - Summer (DST): UTC+2 (CEST)
- Postal code: 52444 Tinjan
- Area code: 052

Brečevići (Italian: Brecovici) is a village in Tinjan municipality in Istria County, Croatia.

== Demographics ==
According to the 2021 census, its population was 182.
