= Jakovici =

Jakovici Iacovici
- Village
- Location within Croatia
- Coordinates: 45.2033996°N 13.7842516°E
- Country: Croatia
- County: Istria County
- Municipality: Tinjan

Area
  - Total: 3.1 sq mi (8.0 km^{2})

Population (2021)
  - Total: 290
  - Density: 94/sq mi (36/km^{2})
- Time zone: UTC+1 (CET)
  - Summer (DST): UTC+2 (CEST)
- Postal code: 52444 Tinjan
- Area code: 052

Jakovici (Italian: Iacovici) is a village in Tinjan municipality in Istria County, Croatia.

== Demographics ==
According to the 2021 census, its population was 290.
