= Muntrilj =

Muntrilj Montreo
- Village
- Location within Croatia
- Coordinates: 45.2469629°N 13.8036912°E
- Country: Croatia
- County: Istria County
- Municipality: Tinjan

Area
  - Total: 2.2 sq mi (5.8 km^{2})

Population (2021)
  - Total: 73
  - Density: 33/sq mi (13/km^{2})
- Time zone: UTC+1 (CET)
  - Summer (DST): UTC+2 (CEST)
- Postal code: 52444 Tinjan
- Area code: 052

Muntrilj (Italian: Montreo) is a village in Tinjan municipality in Istria County, Croatia.

== Demographics ==
According to the 2021 census, its population was 73.
