= Brčići, Tinjan =

Brčići
- Village
- Location within Croatia
- Coordinates: 45.2492271°N 13.7738453°E
- Country: Croatia
- County: Istria County
- Municipality: Tinjan

Area
  - Total: 1.5 sq mi (4.0 km^{2})

Population (2021)
  - Total: 78
  - Density: 51/sq mi (20/km^{2})
- Time zone: UTC+1 (CET)
  - Summer (DST): UTC+2 (CEST)
- Postal code: 52444 Tinjan
- Area code: 052

Brčići is a village in Tinjan municipality in Istria County, Croatia.

== Demographics ==
According to the 2021 census, its population was 78.
