= Mihotići =

Village in Croatia

- Location within Croatia
- Coordinates: 45.3614°N 14.3053°E
- Country: Croatia
- County: Primorje-Gorski Kotar
- Municipality: Matulji

Area
  - Total: 0.9 km^{2} (0.35 sq mi)

Population (2021)
  - Total: 862
  - Density: 960/km^{2} (2,500/sq mi)
- Time zone: UTC+1 (CET)
  - Summer (DST): UTC+2 (CEST)

Mihotići is a village in Croatia within the municipality of Matulji, which is located in the Primorje-Gorski Kotar County.

== Sources ==
- Savezni zavod za statistiku i evidenciju FNRJ i SFRJ, popis stanovništva 1948, 1953, 1961, 1971, 1981. i 1991. godine.
- Knjiga: "Narodnosni i vjerski sastav stanovništva Hrvatske, 1880-1991: po naseljima, author: Jakov Gelo, izdavač: Državni zavod za statistiku Republike Hrvatske, 1998., ISBN 953-6667-07-X, ISBN 978-953-6667-07-9
