= Radetići =

Radetići Radetici
- Village
- Location within Croatia
- Coordinates: 45.1765375°N 13.7811478°E
- Country: Croatia
- County: Istria County
- Municipality: Tinjan

Area
  - Total: 2.7 sq mi (7.1 km^{2})

Population (2021)
  - Total: 226
  - Density: 82/sq mi (32/km^{2})
- Time zone: UTC+1 (CET)
  - Summer (DST): UTC+2 (CEST)
- Postal code: 52444 Tinjan
- Area code: 052

Radetići (Italian: Radetici) is a village in Tinjan municipality in Istria County, Croatia.

== Demographics ==
According to the 2021 census, its population was 226.
