= Juraj Dobrila =

Croatian Roman Catholic bishop and benefactor (1812–1882)

The Most Reverend, Ritter Juraj Dobrila
- Bishop of Trieste and Capodistria
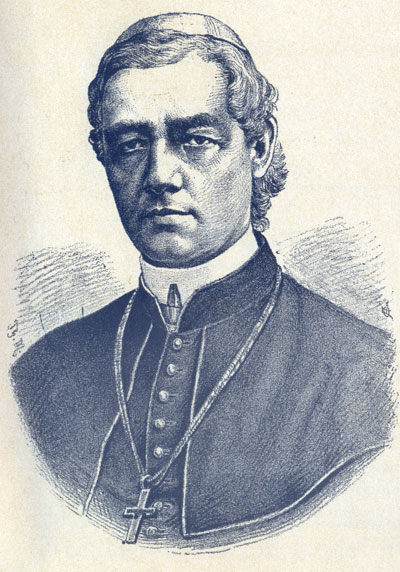
- Native name: Juraj Dobrila
- Church: Roman Catholic Church
- Archdiocese: Gorizia
- Diocese: Trieste and Capodistria
- See: Trieste and Capodistria
- Installed: 29 May 1875
- Term ended: 13 January 1882
- Predecessor: Jernej Legat
- Successor: Janez Nepomuk Glavina
- Previous post: Bishop of Poreč and Pula (1857–75)

Orders
- Ordination: 9 September 1837
- Consecration: 2 May 1858 by Andrej Gollmayer

Personal details
- Born: 16 April 1812 Veli Ježenj, Tinjan, Illyrian Provinces, French Empire
- Died: 13 January 1882 (aged 69) Trieste, Austria-Hungary
- Buried: Cathedral Basilica of the Assumption of Mary, Poreč
- Education: Augustineum, Vienna

Ordination history
History
Diaconal ordination
- Ordained by: Matevž Ravnikar
- Date: 9 September 1837
- Place: Trieste, Austrian Empire
Priestly ordination
- Ordained by: Matevž Ravnikar
- Date: 11 September 1837
- Place: Trieste, Austrian Empire
Episcopal consecration
- Principal consecrator: Andrej Gollmayer
- Co-consecrators: Jernej Legat Ivan Josip Vitezić
- Date: 2 May 1858
- Place: Gorizia, Austrian Empire

Styles of Juraj Dobrila
- Reference style: The Most Reverend
- Spoken style: Your Excellency
- Religious style: Bishop

Juraj Dobrila (Note: His name in Croatian is pronounced [jûraj dǒbrila].) (Note: In contemporary sources, depending on the language, his personal name can also be found as Giorgio in Italian, Georg in German, Jurij or Jurič in Slovene, and Georgius in Latin. The alternative form of his name in sources in Croatian, alongside Juraj, is also Jure. The alternative form of his surname in sources in Italian, alongside Dobrila, is also Dobrilla.) (16 April 1812 – 13 January 1882) was a Croatian Catholic bishop and benefactor from Istria who advocated for greater national rights for South Slavic peoples, Croats and Slovenes, in Istria under Austrian rule.

== Biography ==
Dobrila was born in the village of Veli Ježenj (now part of Pazin), Tinjan (Antignana) region of middle Istria, which was then and for a brief period part of Napoleon's Illyrian provinces and shortly thereafter the Habsburg monarchy (today part of Croatia). His above-average intelligence let him engage a German elementary school in Tinjan and Pazin, then a gymnasium in Gorizia, and Karlovac where he also attended a seminary. He became a priest in 1837 and took duty from 1837 until late 1838 in Mune and Hrusici. From 1839 he studied theology at Augustineum in Vienna and finished in 1842. After his studies, he became a chaplain in Trieste, a German enlighter and a principal of a girl-school. From 1857 to 1875 he was the bishop of the Roman Catholic Diocese of Parenzo e Pola - Poreč i Pula region and from 1875 until his death he was the bishop of the Roman Catholic Diocese of Trieste e Capodistria - Trst in Koper region.

Dobrila studied with and was a friend of Josip Juraj Strossmayer, another Croatian bishop and benefactor of the 19th century. He was a vocal supporter of the Croat and Slovene population in Istria, which was the majority there, but culturally and politically dominated by Italians from the coastal towns.

During the Revolutions of 1848, Dobrila became a member of the Slavjansko društvo ("Slavic society") in Trieste. He supported the introduction of the Slavic languages into schools and public life, funded children who wanted to attend schools in the Croatian part of the monarchy (in Rijeka and Kastav) and encouraged the peasants in Istria, mostly composed of Slavic people, to read books in their native language and avoid being abused by their mostly Italian lords.

Dobrila printed the prayer book Oče, budi volja tvoja in Croatian in 1854, and supported the publishing of the first Croatian newspaper in Istria Naša sloga in 1870. He also published a collection of folk tales and proverbs Različno cvijeće. His second prayer book Mladi Bogoljub was published in 1889. In recognition of his work, Emperor Franz Joseph granted him the Order of the Iron Crown (second class) of Austria in 1866.Pazin city archives & Austrian newspapers of the time confirm his earning the award.

He was a member of the Diet of Istria in Poreč since its founding in 1861 and the representative of the council in the Parliament in Vienna until 1867. He was also a participant of the First Vatican Council (1870) where he supported Bishop Josip Juraj Strossmayer's opposition to the doctrine of papal infallibility.

Dobrila donated his whole estate to charity. Dobrila's portrait was depicted on the obverse of the Croatian 10 kuna banknote issued in 1993, 1995, 2001 and 2004. Two high schools are named after Dobrila, one in Pazin and one in Pula. The University of Pula is named in his honour Juraj Dobrila University of Pula.
