= Matko Laginja =

Croatian lawyer and politician (1852–1930)

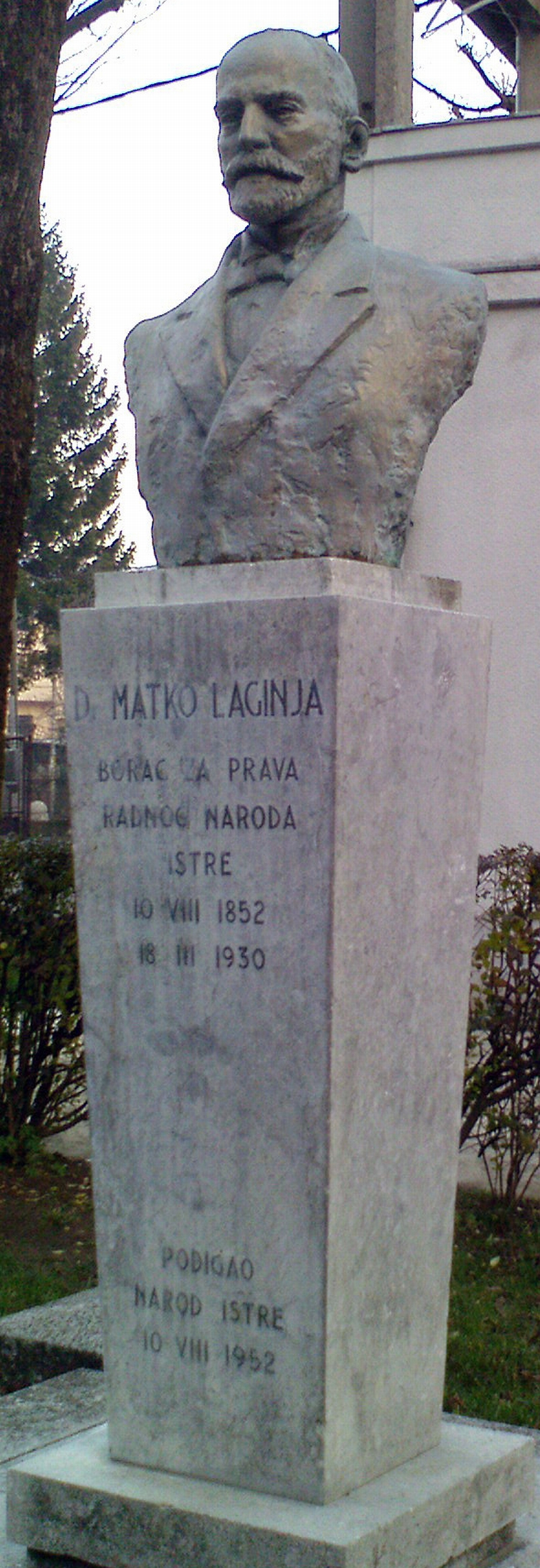
Bust of Matko Laginja

Matko Laginja (10 August 1852 – 18 March 1930) was a Croatian lawyer and politician.

== Biography ==
Born in Klana, he earned a doctorate in law in Graz. In his youth he adopted the political program of Ante Starčević and together with Vjekoslav Spinčić and Matko Mandić brought Croatian national thinking and sharp attacks against the local Italian party and Italian nationalism into the political life of Istria. As a leading local politician, he fought for three decades for a renaissance of the region's Croats. He continued his work in Zagreb, particularly as the ban of Croatia. From 1900 to 1915 he was an attorney in Pula; in 1915 he moved his practice to Zagreb.

He was one of the leaders of the Croatian national movement in Istria as well as a member of the Istrian provincial parliament from 1883 to 1914. For one period he was ambassador to the Imperial Council in Vienna, then president of Starčević's Party of Rights. During the upheaval of fall 1918 he was trustee of the National Council in Istria. With the annexation of Istria to the Kingdom of Italy after World War I, he settled in Zagreb.

From February to December 1920 Laginja was ban of Croatia within the Kingdom of the Serbs, Croats and Slovenes. He was dismissed by the cabinet of Milenko Radomar Vesnić on December 11, 1920 after allowing a rally by the Croatian Peasant Party politician Stjepan Radić in Zagreb on December 8.

He was elected to the Constitutional Assembly as a Croatian Union candidate. He resigned on June 1, 1921 along with ten others issuing a statement against centralization and for a federalized country. After this he withdrew from public life. He died in Zagreb.

Preceded by Tomislav Tomljenović	Ban of Croatia; 1920	Succeeded by Teodor Bošnjak
