= Božo Milanović =

Croatian priest, theologian and politician (1890–1980)

Msgr. Božo Milanović
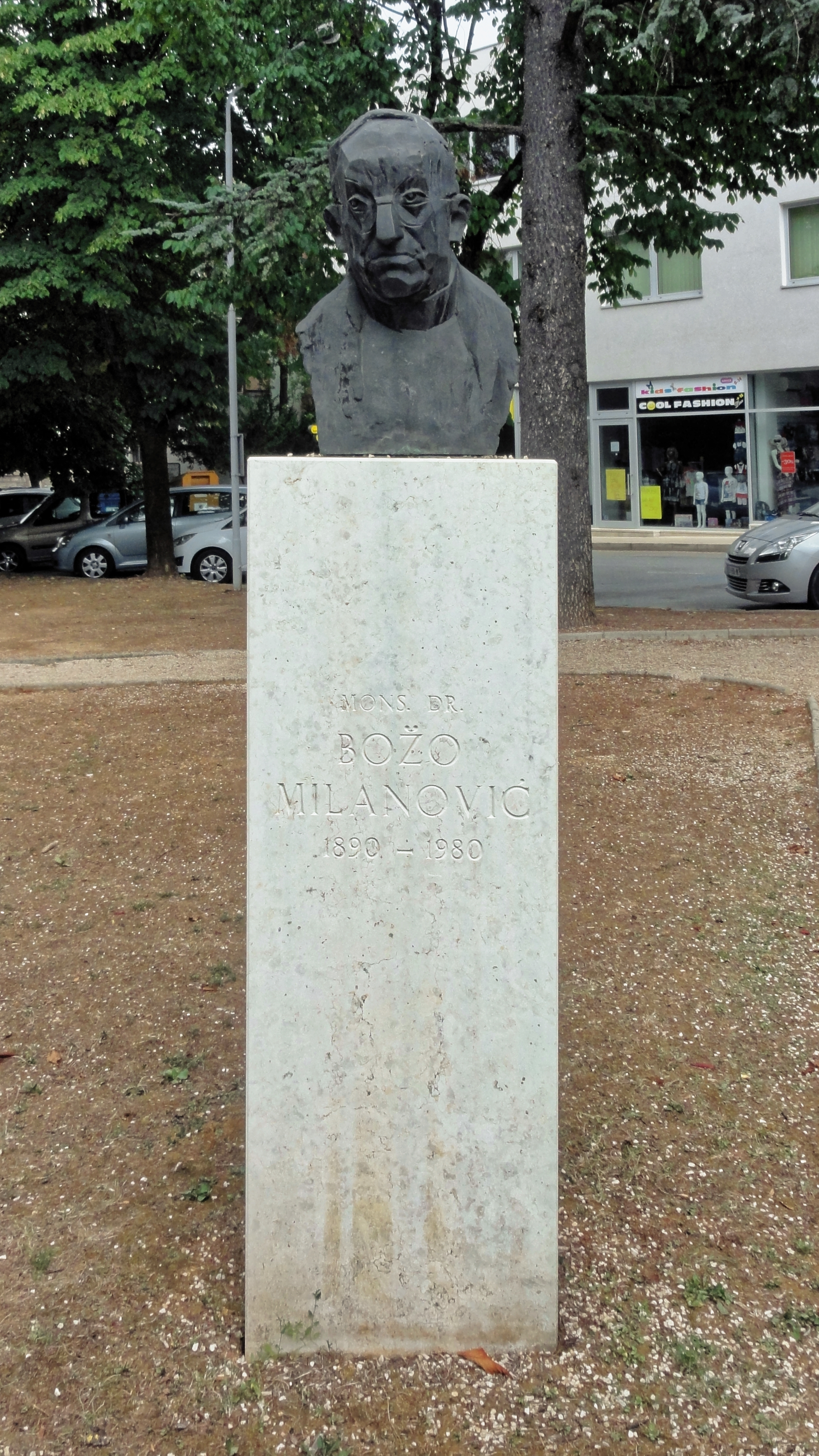
- Monument to Milanović in Pazin
- Born: 10 October 1890; Kringa, Margraviate of Istria, Austria-Hungary (modern Croatia)
- Died: 18 December 1980 (aged 90); Pazin, SR Croatia, SFR Yugoslavia
- Occupations: Priest, theologian, historian, politician

Msgr. Božo Milanović (October 10, 1890 – December 28, 1980) was a Croatian priest, theologian and politician from Istria. Along with Antonio Santin, Milanović was one of the greatest anti-fascists of Istria.

== Biography ==
Božo Milanović was born in Kringa in 1890 to Jakov and Ana, in a Croatian peasant family. He attended primary school in his hometown. After five grades of primary school, he enrolled in the first grade of the Croatian classical Imperial-Royal Great State Gymnasium in Pazin. He was ordained a priest on July 7, 1914, in Trieste. He studied theology in Gorizia. He received his doctorate in Vienna in 1919.

He had a reputation as a populist. In 1923 he became the president of the Istrian Literary Society of St. Cyril and Methodius in Pazin (then called the Society of St. Mohor) and managed that society for many years; works written by Milanović himself were published by the society. At the end of the 1920s, he lived and worked in Trieste, where he published the last permitted literature and had a prominent role in the Istrian resistance in the joint Slovene-Croatian organization Edinost.

In Trieste in 1946, he started the newspaper Gore srca!.

Milanović was the director of the seminary gymnasium of Pazin from 1947 to 1968; and the director of the Theological College in Pazin from 1955 to 1965.

In 1962, he received an honorary doctorate in theology from the University of Zagreb.

After Istria passed to Yugoslavia, many (Croatian) Istrian populists (such as Mate Peteh), as well as priests, were targeted by the Yugoslavian authorities. Priest Miroslav Bulešić was brutally killed, and to this day the body of the priest Francesco Bonifacio has not been found. Božo Milanović himself was called an enemy of the state.

Milanović died in Pazin.

== Bibliography ==
- Istria in the dawn of the national revival: 1797-1860, book, Pazin, 1960.
- Cosmology, book, Pazin, 1967.
- Croatian National Revival in Istria, vol. 1: 1797 - 1882, Pazin, 1967; book 2: 1883 - 1947, Pazin, 1973 (2nd ed. Book 1: (1797 - 1882), Pazin, 1991)
- Metaphysical psychology, book, Pazin, 1968.
- Ethics, book (3rd ed. Pazin, 1968)
- Ontology, book, Pazin, 1969.
- History of Philosophy, book, Pazin, 1970.
- Teodiceja, book, Pazin, 1970.
- Revivalist of Istria, Bishop Dr. Juraj Dobrila, Pazin, 1970
- Experimental Psychology, book (3rd ed. Pazin, 1964, 4th ed. Pazin, 1971)
- Our Father, prayer book, Pazin, 1974.
- My memories: (1900-1976), book, Pazin, 1976.
- Istria in the 20th century: notes and reflections on the time lived, vol. 1: Under Austria and Italy, Pazin, 1992; book 2: War and Liberation, Pazin, 1996.
- Croatian border in northwestern Istria, article, Nova Istra 18 (2013), 1/2 (47); p. 284–286.

== Sources ==
- Stipan Trogrlić, From the "People's Enemy" to a Respectable Interlocutor, Glas Koncila, January 2, 2011, p. 21., sublist diplomatic struggle Msgr. Božo Milanović for Croatian Istria (1)
- Maja Polić, Scientific Conference Mons. Dr. Božo Milanović - traces of a vision, Pazin, 2010. // Rijeka, sv. 16, no. March 1, 2011, p. 87-89, (Hamster)
- Stipan Trogrlić, The Istrian Croatian Clergy and the Diplomatic-Political Struggle for the Unification of Istria with Croatia (1945–1954) // Društvena istraživanja, sv. 21, no. 2 (116). April 2012, p. 485-504, (Hamster)
- Jasna Ćurković Nimac, Stipe Tadić and Stipan Trogrlić, Božo Milanović and the ethical implications of his political activity // Nova prisnostnost: časopis za intelektualna i duhovna pitanja, sv. XI, no. 3. November 2013, p. 349–364, (Hrčak)
