= Starčević =

Starčević (Serbian: Старчевић) is a South Slavic surname. The surname may refer to:

- Ante Starčević (1823–1896), Croatian politician and writer
- David Starčević (1840–1908), Croatian politician and a lawyer
- Dragan Starčević (born 1977), Serbian footballer
- Mile Starčević (1862–1917), Croatian politician
- Mile Starčević (1904–1953), Croatian politician
- Slobodan Starčević (born 1971), Bosnian Serb football manager
- Šime Starčević (1784–1859), Croatian priest and linguist

== See also ==
- Starcevich
