= Dinko Trinajstić =

Croatian politician and lawyer (1858 – 1939)

- Born: 9 October 1858; Vrbnik, Austrian Littoral, Austrian Empire (now Croatia)
- Died: 27 February 1939 (aged 80); Crikvenica, Yugoslavia (now Croatia)
- Education: University of Vienna; University of Zagreb; University of Graz
- Occupations: Politician, lawyer
- Political party: Party of Rights

Dinko Trinajstić (Vrbnik, 9 October 1858 – Crikvenica, 27 February 1939) was a lawyer and Croatian and Yugoslavian politician. He was a member of the Party of Rights and supporter of Yugoslavist ideas advocated by bishop Josip Juraj Strossmayer. Trinajstić studied law in Vienna, Zagreb, and Graz before attaining the doctoral degree in law. He practised in the law firm of his uncle, Dinko Vitezić in Krk. In 1894, he moved to Pazin in Istria where he practised law and was elected mayor in 1895–1898 and a member of the Diet of Istria in 1895–1910. In 1895, Trinajstić established a branch of the Istarska posujilnica u Puli building society in Pazin and ran it. In 1902, Trinajstić took part (as vice-president) in establishment and running of the Political Society for Croats and Slovenes in Istria aimed at enhancing cooperation with Slovene Trieste-based Edinost society and subsequent establishment of the Croat-Slovene People's Party. In 1915, after beginning of the World War I, Trinajstić left the country and joined the Yugoslav Committee led by Ante Trumbić. Trinajstić briefly led the committee in 1919. After establishment of the Kingdom of Serbs, Croats and Slovenes, he was appointed a member of the country's provisional legislative body, the Temporary National Representation as a representative of Istria. Trinajstić left politics after he was disappointed by provisions of the 1920 Treaty of Rapallo which attempted to resolve the Adriatic Question by awarding Istria to the Kingdom of Italy. Trinajstić was appointed a Yugoslav Senator (a member of the upper chamber of the Assembly of Yugoslavia) in old age.
