= Kringa =

Village in Croatia

Kringa Corridico
- Village
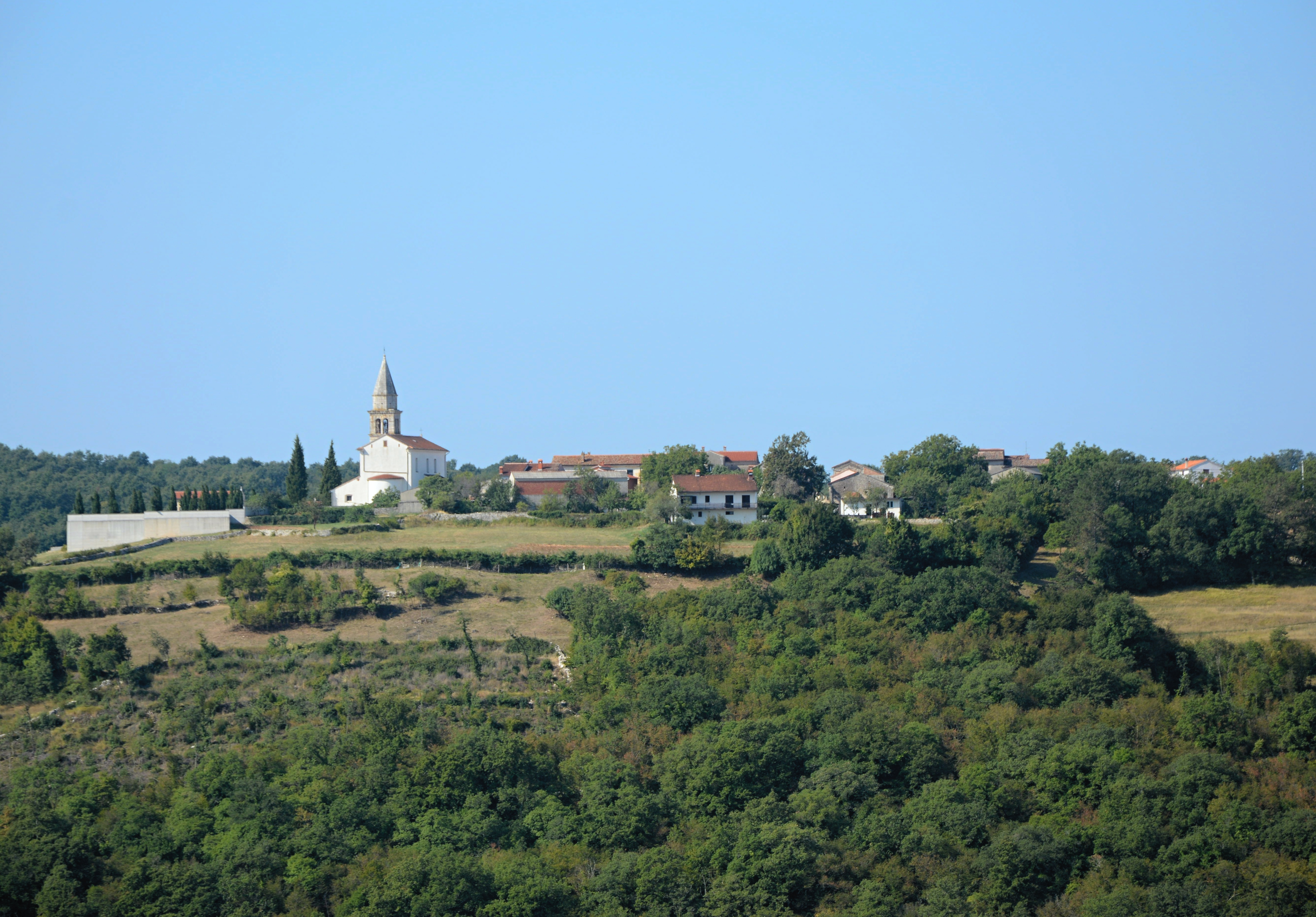

- Location within Croatia
- Coordinates: 45.183145°N 13.835144°E
- Country: Croatia
- County: Istria County
- Municipality: Tinjan

Area
  - Total: 3.5 sq mi (9.1 km^{2})

Population (2021)
  - Total: 324
  - Density: 92/sq mi (36/km^{2})
- Time zone: UTC+1 (CET)
  - Summer (DST): UTC+2 (CEST)
- Postal code: 52444 Tinjan
- Area code: 052

Kringa (Italian: Corridico) is a village near Tinjan, Istria, Croatia.

Kringa is home to the vampire legend of Jure Grando.

== Demographics ==
According to the 2021 census, its population was 324. In the 2011 census, the population of Kringa was 315.
