= Viktor Car Emin =

Viktor Car Emin (Kraj at Mošćenička Draga, 1 November 1870 – Opatija, 17 April 1963) was a prominent Croatian writer. He graduated from Teachers School in Kopar. He was expelled from the Italian controlled Istria first to settle in Sušak, and after the end of World War II in Yugoslavia in 1945 he moved to Opatija where he spent the rest of his life. His numerous novels and stories deal with economic-social and political problems of the past and the present of Istria. His most significant works include: Insignificant People (1900), Become Parched Source (1904), In Doubt (1918), The Hero of the Sea (1939) and Dannunziade (1946). He dealt with the same topics in his theatre writing work, such as: Winter Sun (1902), and In Guard (1923). In 1952 Car Emin published a volume of memories entitled Left Days.

== Sources ==
- Car Emin, Viktor (in Croatian)
