= Higher Scientific Institute for Diocesan Priests at St. Augustine's =

Abolished school for priests in Vienna, Austria

The Higher Scientific Institute for Diocesan Priests at St. Augustine's (German: Das höheres Weltpriesterbildungsinstitut zum hl. Augustin) in Vienna, also well known as Augustineum or as Frintaneum, was a school for diocesan priests that existed between 1816 and 1918.

Seat of the institution was in the former monastery of Augustinians at Vienna's Hofburg and after 1914 on Habsburggasse street. The main reason for the establishment of the Institute was the desire of Vienna court to educate its own priests, independent of Rome.

Pupils of the Institute have studied theology for three years to achieve a doctorate. Pupils wore own special uniform. The Institute was opened for pupils from all over the Austro-Hungarian Monarchy. Until 1916, when it was abolished, it was attended by more than 1,000 pupils.
