= Vjekoslav Spinčić =

Croatian politician

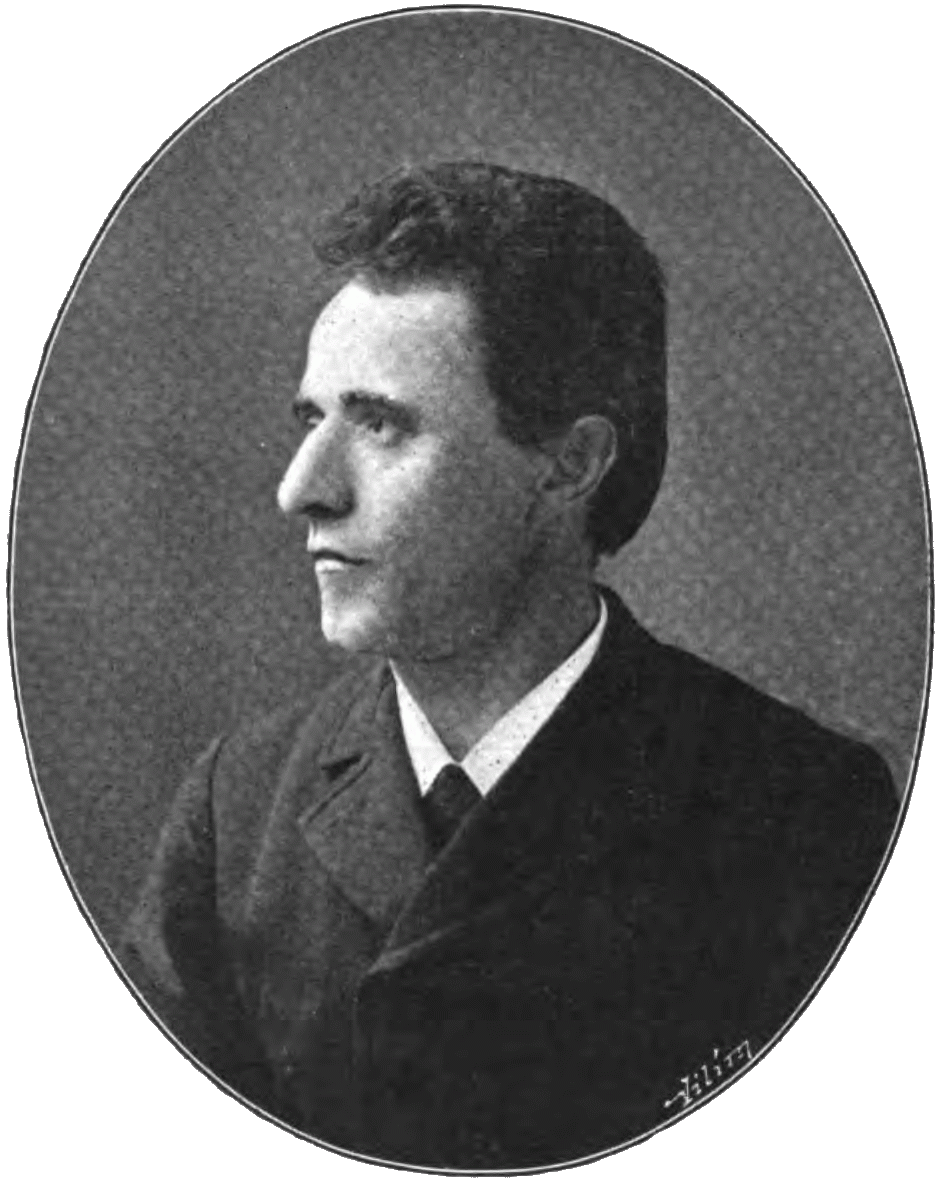
- Vjekoslav Spinčić (Jan Vilím, 1898)
- Born: 23 October 1848; Spinčići near Kastav
- Died: 27 May 1933 (aged 84); Sušak, Kingdom of Serbs, Croats and Slovenes
- Occupation: politician
- Known for: one of the most influential Croatian politicians in Istria
- Notable work: see Works
- Political party: Party of Rights

Vjekoslav Spinčić (23 October 1848 – 27 May 1933) was a Croatian politician from Istria.

Born in Spinčići near Kastav, he studied theology in Gorizia and Trieste, and was ordained a priest in 1872. Afterwards, he continued studies in history and geography in Prague and Vienna. He worked as a teacher in Koper, and later in Gorizia. In 1892, after saying Istria belongs to Croatia while in Zagreb, he was fired from his job in Gorizia.

Along with Matko Mandić and Matko Laginja, he was one of the most influential Croatian politicians in Istria at the time, a member of the Party of Rights. He served in the Imperial Council multiple times. At the Unveiling of the Gundulić monument in Dubrovnik, Spinčić arrived as the highest ranking Croatian politician from Istria and laid a wreath as its representative.

In 1908, he refused to recognize the agreement between the Croatian-Slovenian Peoples' Parties with the Italian Liberal Party about the overhaul of politics in Istria. Spinčić was a long-time president of the Society of Sts. Cyril and Methodius in Istria. He left politics after the annexation of Istria to Italy in 1920. After this, he moved to the Croatian town of Sušak in the then Kingdom of Serbs, Croats and Slovenes, where he died in 1933.

== Works ==
- Slavensko bogoslužje u Istri (1913)
- Narodni preporod u Istri (1924)
- Crtice iz hrvatske književne kulture Istre (1926)

== Sources ==
- Spinčić, Vjekoslav at istrapedia.hr (in Croatian)
- Spinčić, Vjekoslav at enciklopedija.hr (in Croatian)
