= Kastav =

- Town
- Grad Kastav; Town of Kastav
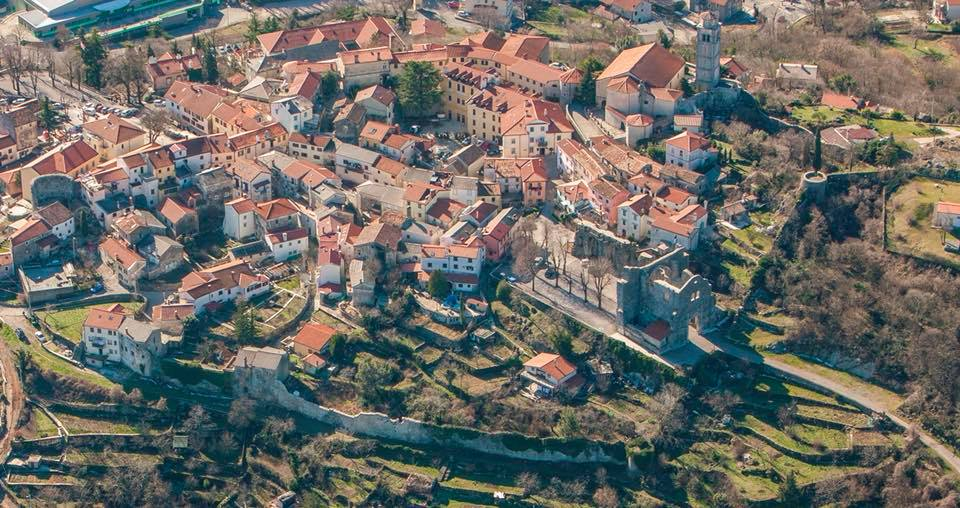
- Aerial view

- Flag
- Interactive map of Kastav
- Location of Kastav within Croatia
- Coordinates: 45.375°N 14.349°E
- Country: Croatia
- Region: Central Croatia (Croatian Littoral)
- County: Primorje-Gorski Kotar County

Government
  - Mayor: Matej Mostarac (SDP)
  - City Council: 17 members: SDP-PGS-IDS-HNS-ARS-HSU-HSS (8); _; AM (4); _; HDZ-HDS-HSP-HSLS (4); _; R (1)

Area
  - Town: 11.4 km^{2} (4.4 sq mi)
  - Urban: 11.4 km^{2} (4.4 sq mi)

Population (2021)
  - Town: 10,202
  - Density: 895/km^{2} (2,320/sq mi)
  - Urban: 10,202
  - Urban density: 895/km^{2} (2,320/sq mi)
- Time zone: UTC+1 (CET)
  - Summer (DST): UTC+2 (CEST)
- Postal code: 51215
- Area code: 051
- Website: kastav.hr

Kastav (Italian: Castua) is a town in Primorje-Gorski Kotar County, in western Croatia, built on a 365 m hill overlooking the Kvarner Gulf on the northern coast of the Adriatic. It is near Rijeka, the largest port in Croatia, and the Opatija Riviera, one of the popular tourist destinations in the country.

== Demographics ==
In the census of 2021, the total population of Kastav was 10,202.

In the census of 2001, the total municipality population was 8,891, in the following settlements:

- Brnčići, population 677
- Ćikovići, population 3,089
- Kastav, population 2,037
- Rubeši, population 1,722
- Spinčići, population 876
- Trinajstići, population 490

In the 2011 census, all of the settlements were merged into a single settlement, Kastav, with a total population of 10,265.

Town of Kastav: Population trends 1857–2021
v

population	2518	2519	2626	2991	3238	3460	2498	2830	2005	2117	2189	2290	4485	5995	8891	10440	10202
	1857	1869	1880	1890	1900	1910	1921	1931	1948	1953	1961	1971	1981	1991	2001	2011	2021

Sources: Croatian Bureau of Statistics publications

== History ==
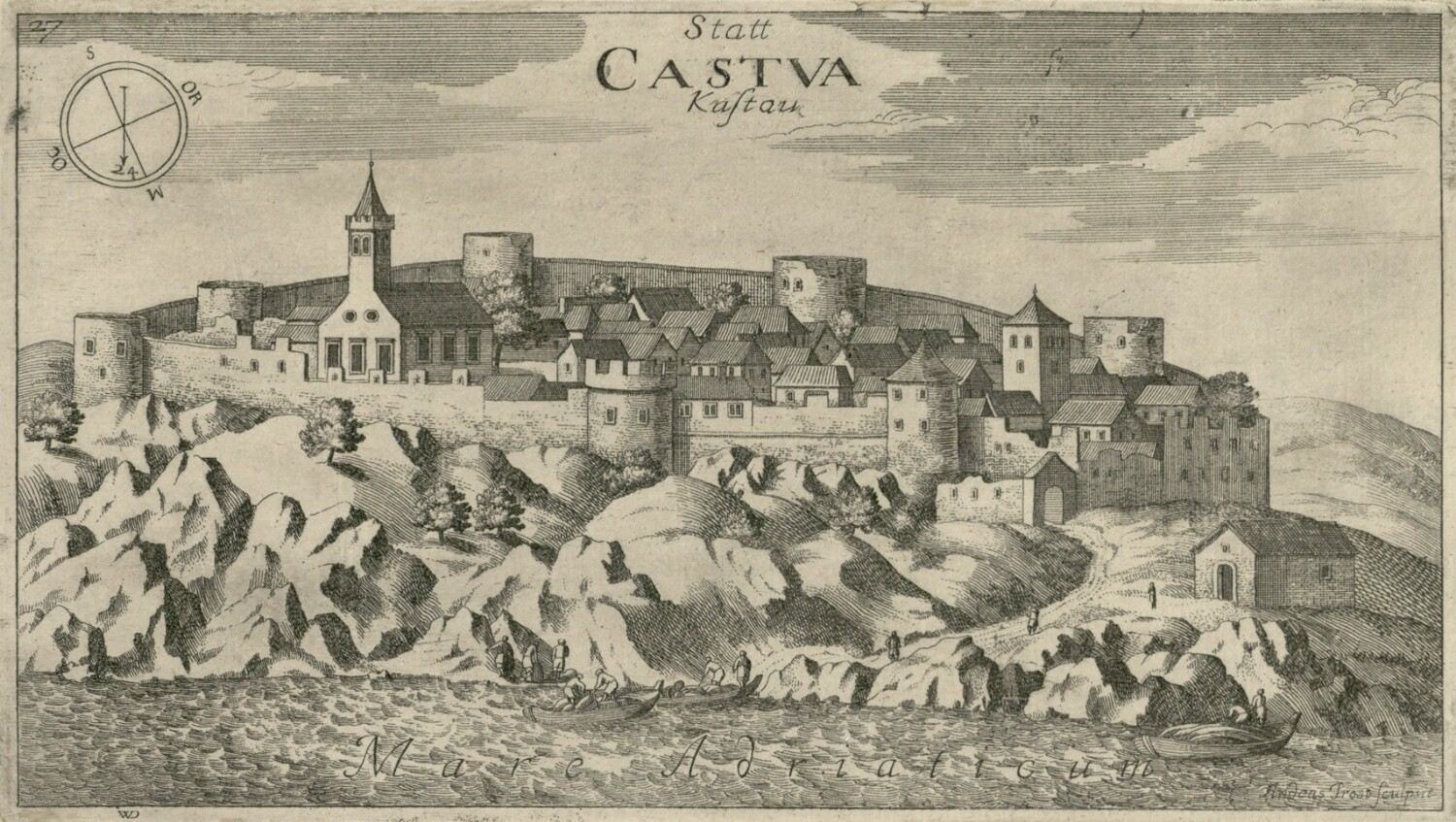
Kastav in 1679

The history of Kastav dates back to prehistoric times, which is borne out by numerous archaeological finds. A valuable archaeological site is the Illyrian necropolis found in the Mišinci karst valley at the foot of the town. It is where the Iapodes, one of the Illyrian tribes, buried their deceased. Pieces of jewellery, buttons and needle pins were also found.

It is not known for sure how Kastav gained its name. Some claim the name to be derived from the Celtic word kast (rock, and others claim it to be derived from the Latin word castellum (fort, castle).

Valuable monuments that have been preserved witness the medieval liveliness of the Kastav area. Among them are the town's Kaštel, the Municipal Loggia, the Volta (arched doorway), The Parish Church of Saint Jelena Križarica, Lokvina square, the remains of the Crekvina and the Church of the Holy Trinity and a number of ornaments embedded in the nucleus of the town.

Writings in various books witness the town's rich history. Kastav is mentioned in all of the important sources that deal with the history of Croatia, as well as in those that deal with the history of region part of Europe.

A 22 December 1939 decision as part of agrarian reforms by Ban Šubašić to confiscate the forest property in Kastav and surroundings of the Thurn and Taxis family, Kálmán Ghyczy and Nikola Petrović resulted in a legal dispute known as the Thurn and Taxis Affair, in part by the relative status of the family and the area's proximity to the Italian border.

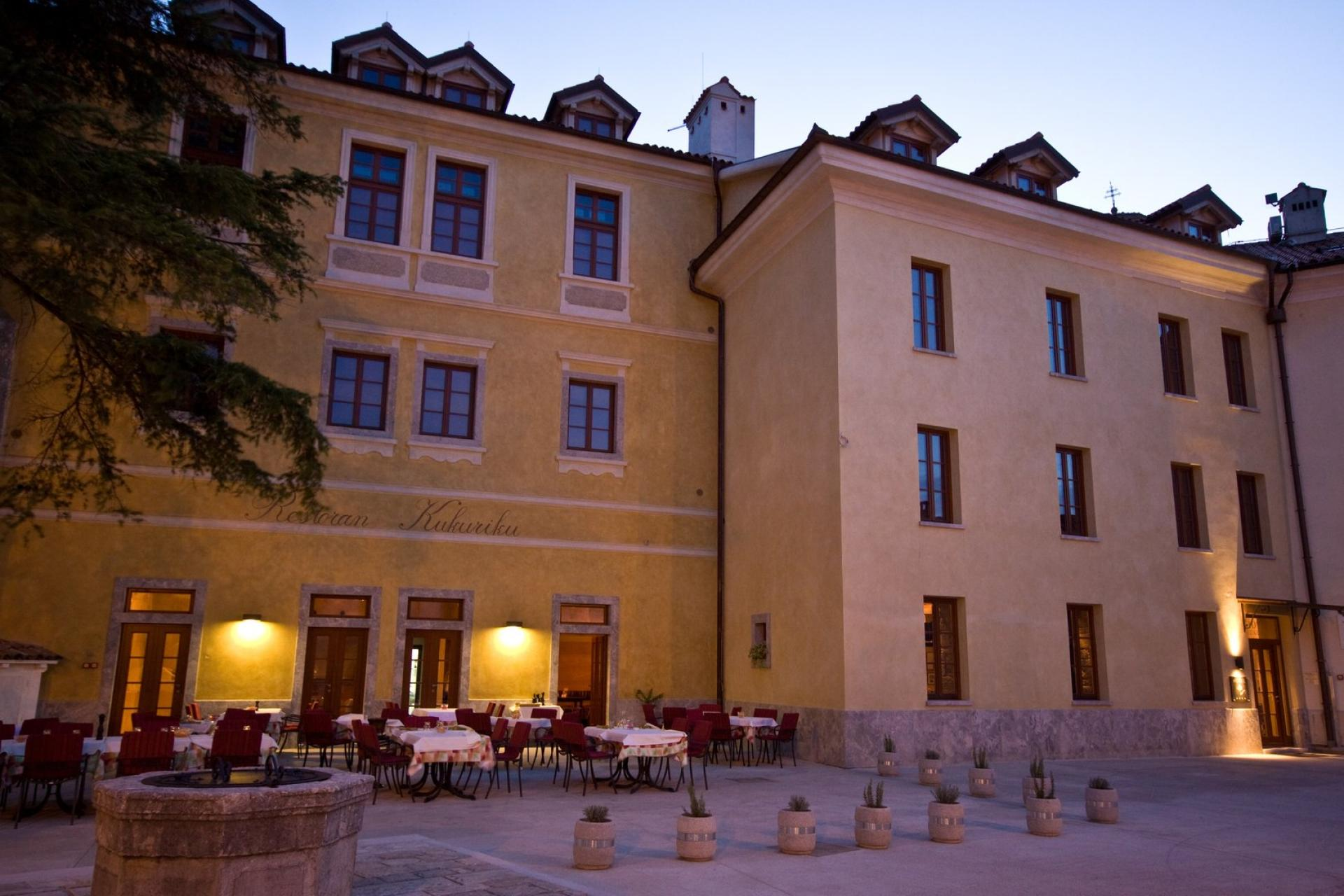
Kukuriku hotel

== Economy ==
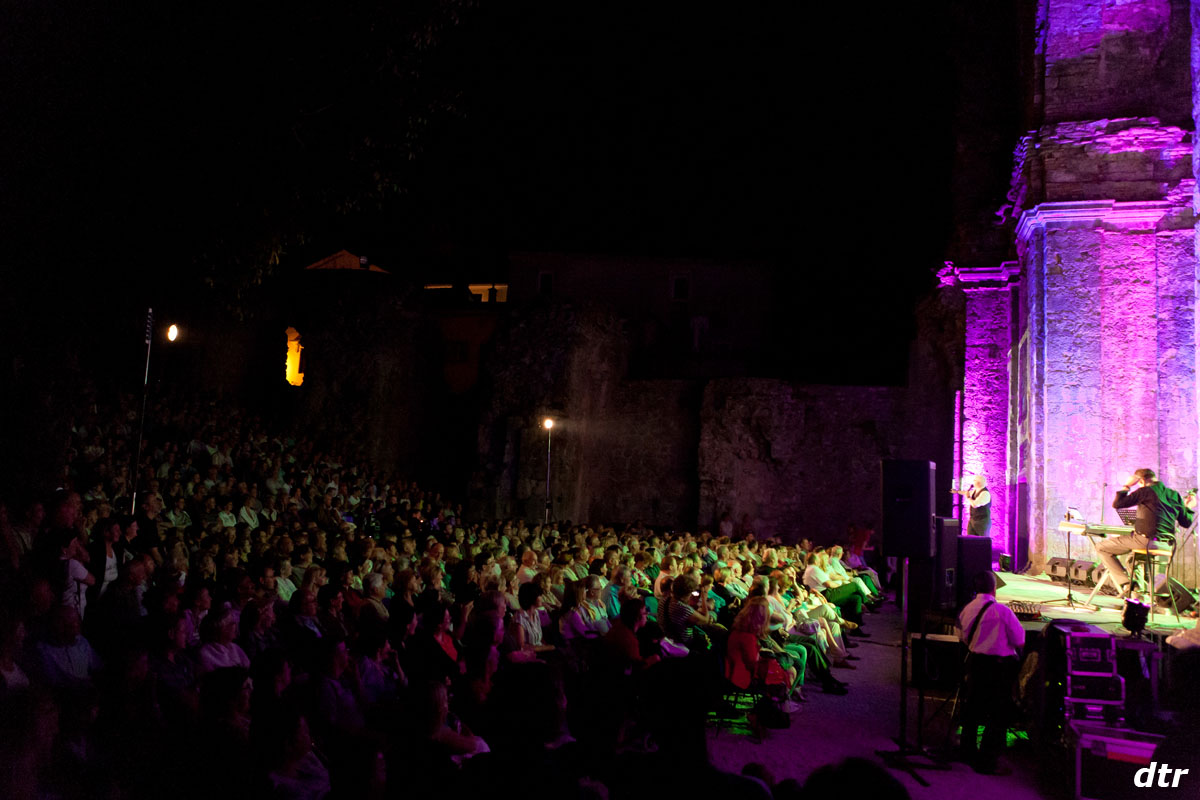
Kastav Cultural Summer

The Kastav region has always been known for its high-quality craftsmanship. The town's economy is still marked by small and medium scaled enterprises and just a few larger firms. Those kinds of businesses have good prospects in present-day economic conditions, and such an economic structure has helped the region preserve its natural and cultural heritage, which persist on the development of ecologically-acceptable activities in accordance with sustainable development trends. The town of Kastav has signed The Aalbor Charter for the sustainable development of European cities in the 21st century and so joined around 400 cities from 35 European countries.

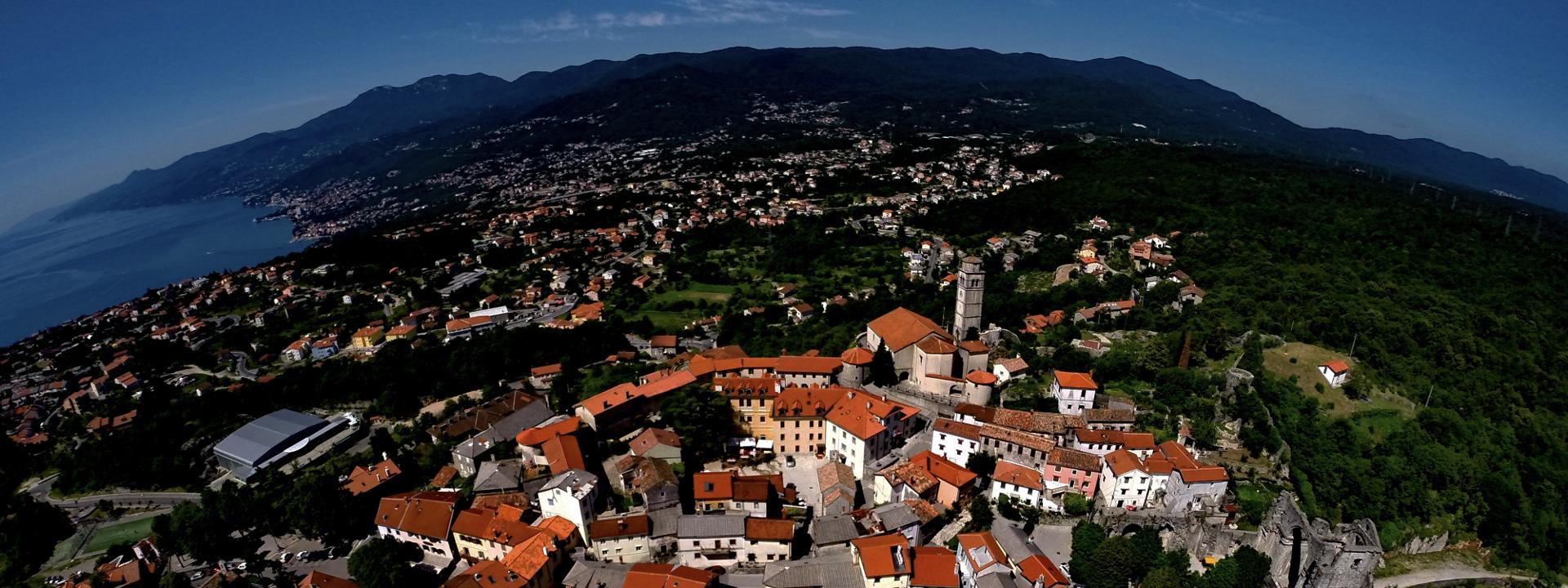
Kastav view

== Ateliers ==
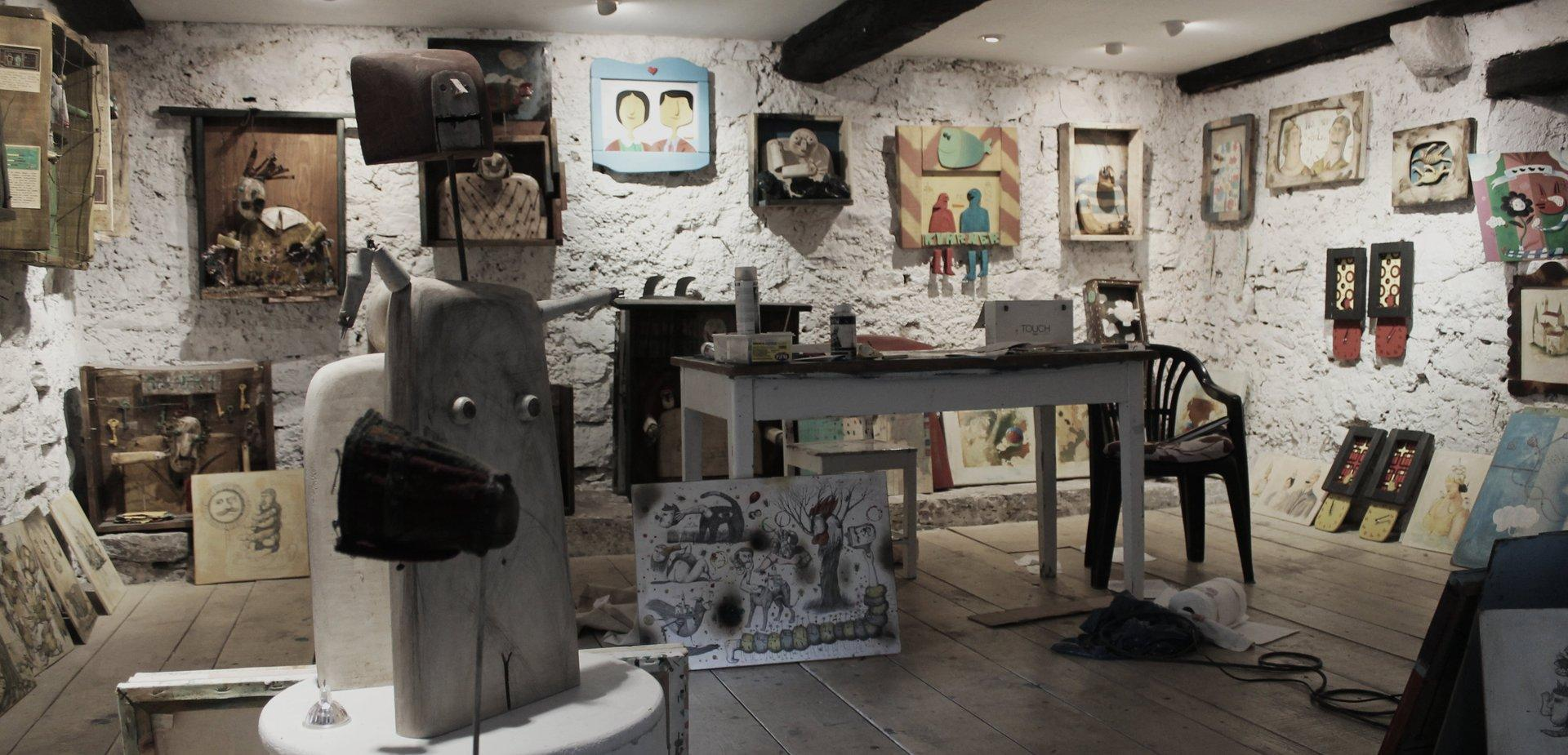
Atelier Saša Jantolek

Atelier POTOČNJAK is where the artist Ante Potočnjak exhibits his distinctive works. In 2006, Croatia's president Mr. Stjepan Mesić awarded him the Order of Croatian Danica inscribed with the figure of Marko Marulić for his extraordinary contribution to Croatian culture. Atelier LOKVINA opened on 6 June 2009 as the working space of the painter Saša Jantolek and the ceramic sculptor Mladen Ivančić, whose works are exhibited here throughout the year

Atelier PAVIĆ is the working and exhibiting space of the artist Željan Pavić from Kastav (born in 1952), who graduated in Visual Arts from the Pedagogic Academy in his hometown of Rijeka.

The Cvetković family fashion boutique was founded in the 1970s as the first art space in Kastav.

Yasna Skorup Krneta: Ambient art installation – objects made of metal and discarded items – displayed in the old town of Kastav, in front of Crekvina.

== Recreation ==
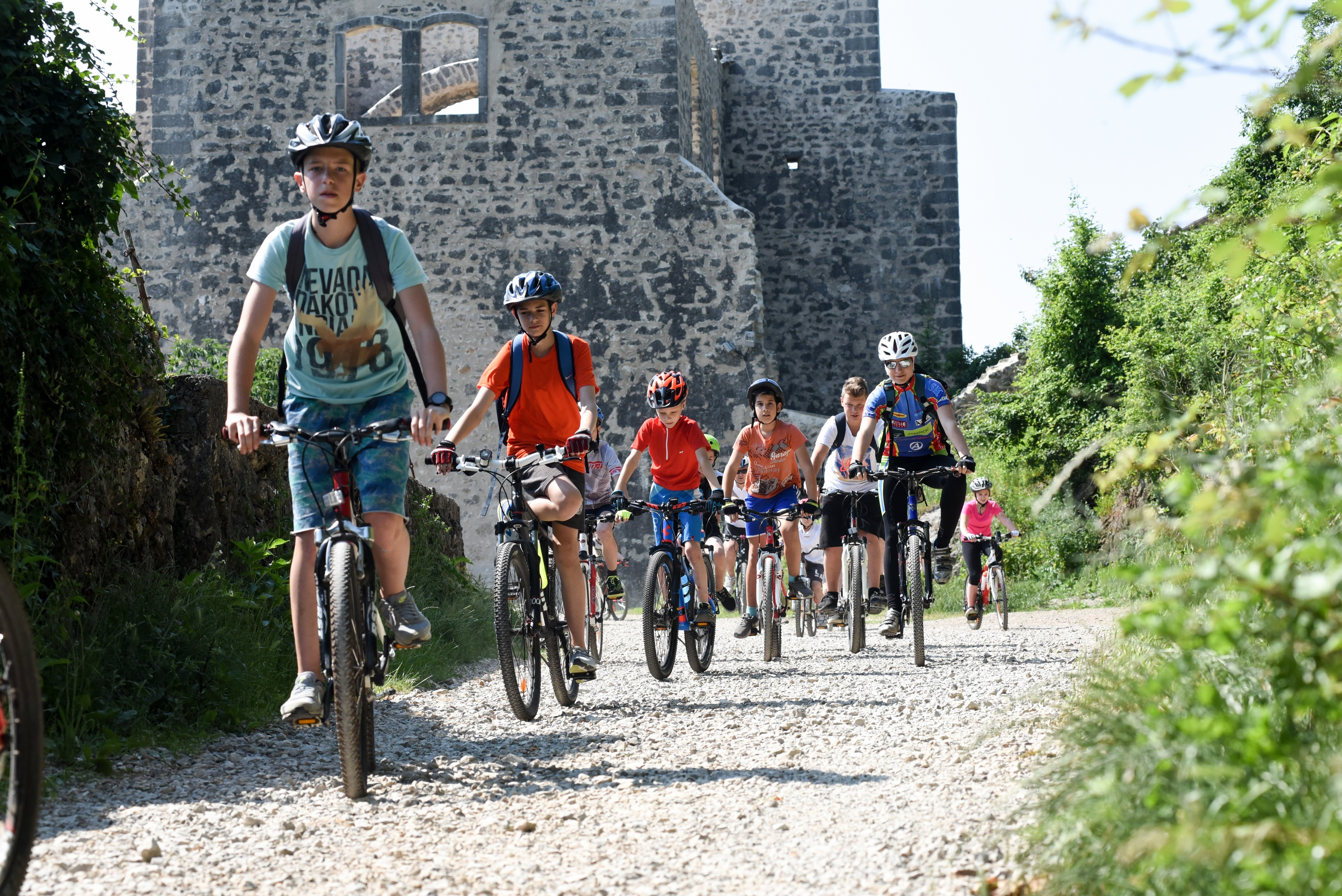
Bike race, Kastav

Since the town of Kastav has both rich cultural and architectural heritage and exceptionally attractive landscapes and untouched nature, the tourist board and the town’s government have supported the Let's walk in Loza and Lužina project proposed by The Association of Retired and Elderly Citizens. As a result, with funds provided by The Academy for Educational Development three tracks through Kastav woods of Loza and Lužina were created and opened in 2005 on World Walking Day. Kastav was once both the starting point as well as the destination (depending on the direction from which you start your journey) of the E6 European Walk Way which stretched all the way to Sweden. After Croatia and Slovenia became independent states, the borderline between the two states cut off the authentic walkway which these days ends at the Slovenian port of Kopar. Since it is important to be sound in body and mind the Kastav area does not lag behind when it comes to sports facilities. In addition to the sports hall and ground, Kastav also offers bocce and tennis courts. There are several locations suitable for various types of recreation (yoga, fitness, pilates/medical gymnastics, spinning, zumba, S-faktor, tae-bo, functional mix, body workout, kettlebell workout, basketball, volleyball, handball, karate, five-s-side football etc.)

The local HPS chapter was called HPD "Učka", but it was liquidated on 3 June 1935.
