= Tinjan =

Tinjan Antignana
- Municipality
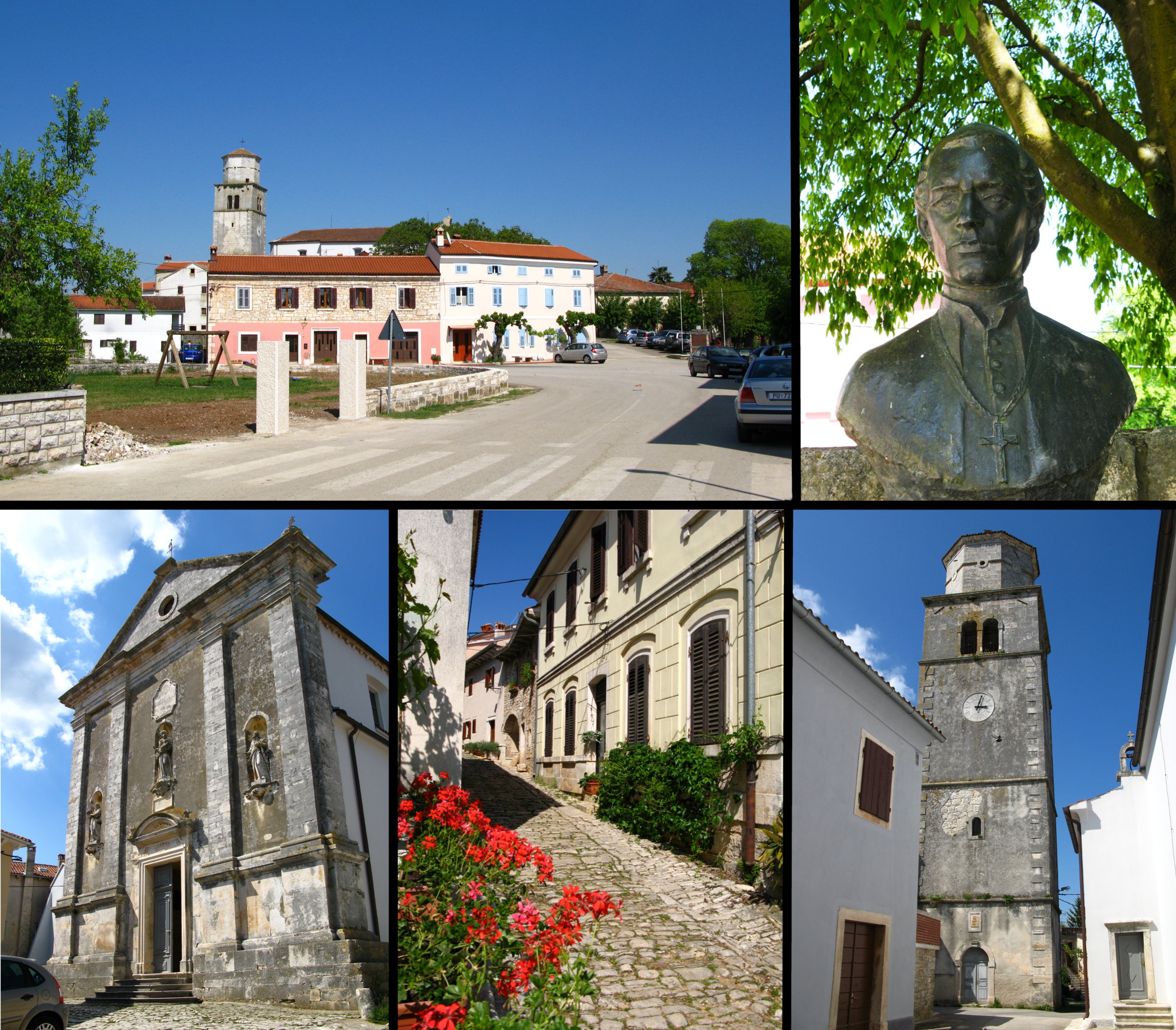

- Flag

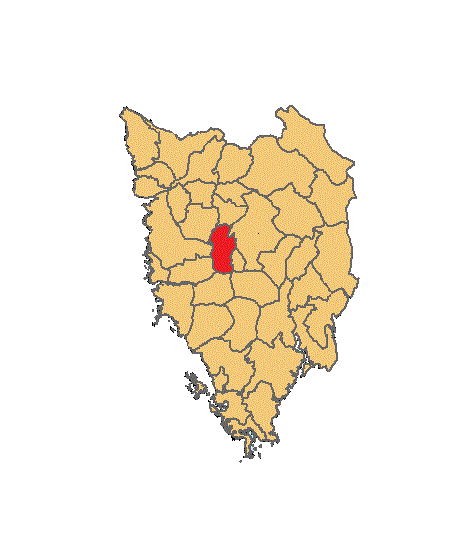
- Location of Tinjan in Istria
- Interactive map of Tinjan
- Location within Croatia
- Coordinates: 45°13′02″N 13°50′20″E
- Country: Croatia
- County: Istria County

Area
  - Municipality: 20.4 sq mi (52.8 km^{2})
  - Urban: 4.2 sq mi (10.8 km^{2})

Population (2021)
  - Municipality: 1,729
  - Density: 84.8/sq mi (32.7/km^{2})
  - Urban: 433
  - Urban density: 104/sq mi (40.1/km^{2})
- Time zone: UTC+1 (CET)
  - Summer (DST): UTC+2 (CEST)
- Postal code: 52000 Pazin
- Area code: 52
- Website: tinjan.hr

Tinjan (Italian: Antignana) is a village and municipality in Istria, west Croatia.

Tinjan is located 50 km north of Pula and 10 km southwest of Pazin, in the Draga valley. The Coat of Arms of Tinjan is azure on a base vert a tower argent behind walls of the same. This is based on the historical pattern.

== Demographics ==
According to the 2021 census, its population was 1,729 with 433 living in the village of Tinjan itself.

The municipality consists of the following settlements:

- Brčići, population 78
- Brečevići, population 182
- Jakovici, population 290
- Kringa, population 324
- Muntrilj, population 73
- Radetići, population 226
- Tinjan, population 433
- Žužići, population 123
Tinjan: Population trends 1857–2021
v

population	2664	2755	2746	2998	3132	3555	3771	3636	3389	3259	2591	2243	1999	1820	1770	1684	1729
	1857	1869	1880	1890	1900	1910	1921	1931	1948	1953	1961	1971	1981	1991	2001	2011	2021

Sources: Croatian Bureau of Statistics publications
