= Diet of Istria =

The Diet of Istria (Croatian: Istarski sabor; Italian: Dieta provinciale dell'Istria/Dieta istriana; German: Istrian[isch]er Landtag) was the regional parliament of the Margravate of Istria within the Austrian Littoral of the Austro-Hungarian Empire. It was founded in 1861 and based in Poreč.

== Provincial captains ==
The speakers of the Istrian Diet were titled provincial captains (Italian: capitano provinciale/pl. capitani provinciali, German: Landeshauptmann/pl. Landeshauptleute, Slovenian: deželni glavar)

- 4 March 1849 – 6 April 1861: Baron Friedrich von Grimschitz (1793–1863)
- 6 April 1861 – 25 September 1861: Gian Paolo, marchese Polesini (1818–1882)
- 25 September 1861 – 16 April 1868: Francesco, marchese Polesini
- 16 April 1869 – 23 January 1889: Francesco Vidulich (1819–1889)
- 23 January 1889 – 24 October 1903: Matteo Campitelli (1828–1906)
- 24 October 1903 – 3 April 1916: Lodovico Rizzi (1859–1945)
- 3 April 1916 – 9 November 1918: Luigi Lasciac

== See also ==
- Diet of Dalmatia
