= National question =

Concepts related to nationalism

National question is a term used for a variety of issues related to nationalism. It is seen especially often in socialist thought and doctrine.

== In socialism ==
- Social Democracy and the National Question by Vladimir Medem in 1904
- Social Democracy and the Nationalities Question by Otto Bauer in 1907
- The National Question and Autonomy by Rosa Luxemburg in 1909
- Theses on the National Question, writings by Vladimir Lenin in 1913, first published in 1925
- Marxism and the National Question, a 1913 pamphlet by Joseph Stalin on the definition and roles of nations within Marxism
- The Problem of Nationalities, Chapter 39 of Leon Trotsky's History of the Russia Revolution Volume 3: The Triumph of the Soviets
- Zur nationalen Frage in Österreich, a 1937 articles by Alfred Klahr on Austria
- On the Question of Nationalities in Ethiopia by Wallelign Mekonnen in 1969

== Other national questions ==
- Adriatic question
- Albanian question
- Armenian question
- Aromanian question
- Bessarabian question
- Croatian question
- Cyprus question
- Eastern question
  - Greek Project
  - Thracian question
- German question
- Irish question
- Jewish question
- Kaliningrad question
- Karelian question
- Kurdish question
  - Mosul question
- Macedonian question
- Montenegrin question
- Palestinian question
- Polish question
- Quebec national question
- Roman question
- Schleswig-Holstein question
- Serbian question
- Taiwan question
- Ukrainian question, see Little Russia and Russification of Ukraine
- Wendish question
- West Lothian question
- "Question of Western Sahara", the title of two United Nations resolutions:
  - United Nations General Assembly Resolution 34/37
  - United Nations General Assembly Resolution 40/50

== See also ==
- National liberation (Marxism)
- Occasional Discourse on the Negro Question
- Self-determination
- The Race Question
- Wars of national liberation
