= Treaty of Rapallo (1920) =

Border agreement

Treaty between the Kingdom of Italy and the Kingdom of the Serbs, Croats and Slovenes signed at Rapallo, 12 November 1920
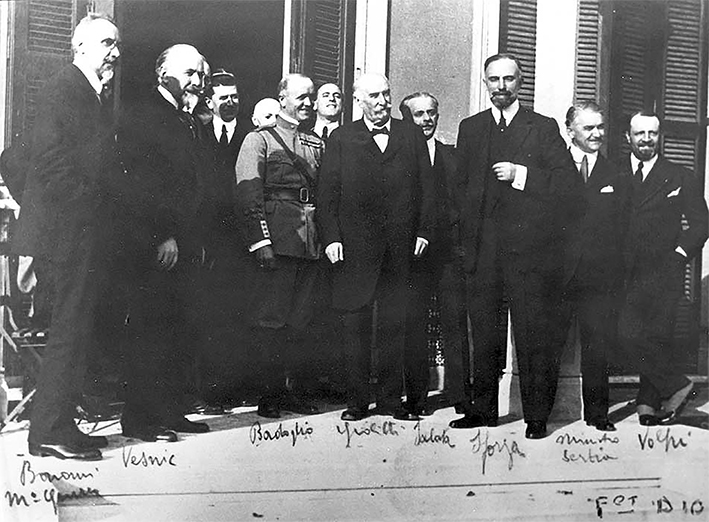
- Conference delegates after signing of the Treaty of Rapallo. From left to right: Ivanoe Bonomi, Milenko Vesnić, Pietro Badoglio, Giovanni Giolitti, Francesco Salata, Carlo Sforza, Vojislav Antonijević, and Giuseppe Volpi
- Type: Border agreement
- Context: First World War
- Signed: 12 November 1920
- Location: Rapallo, Italy
- Replaced by: Treaty of Rome (1924)
- Signatories: Giovanni Giolitti; Carlo Sforza; Ivanoe Bonomi; Milenko Vesnić; Ante Trumbić; Kosta Stojanović
- Parties: Italy; Kingdom of Serbs, Croats and Slovenes
- Language: Italian, Serbo-Croatian

The Treaty of Rapallo was an agreement between the Kingdom of Italy and the Kingdom of Serbs, Croats and Slovenes in the aftermath of the First World War. It was intended to settle the Adriatic question, which referred to Italian claims over territories promised to the country in return for its entry into the war against Austria-Hungary, claims that were made on the basis of the 1915 Treaty of London. The wartime pact promised Italy large areas of the eastern Adriatic. The treaty, signed on 12 November 1920 in Rapallo, Italy, generally redeemed the promises of territorial gains in the former Austrian Littoral by awarding Italy territories generally corresponding to the peninsula of Istria and the former Princely County of Gorizia and Gradisca, with the addition of the Snežnik Plateau, in addition to what was promised by the London treaty. The articles regarding Dalmatia were largely ignored. Instead, in Dalmatia, Italy received the city of Zadar and several islands. Other provisions of the treaty contained safeguards for the rights of Italian nationals remaining in the Kingdom of Serbs, Croats and Slovenes, and provisions for commissions to demarcate the new border, and facilitate economic and educational cooperation. The treaty also established the Free State of Fiume, the city-state consisting of the former Austro-Hungarian Corpus separatum that consisted of Rijeka and a strip of coast giving the new state a land border with Italy at Istria.

The treaty was met with a degree of popular disapproval in both countries. In the Kingdom of Serbs, Croats and Slovenes it was unpopular with Slovenes and Croats, as it represented a loss of national territory where about a half million Slovenes and Croats lived. Zadar lost significance when it became an Italian semi-enclave, which allowed Split to overtake it in significance in Dalmatia. The Port of Rijeka suffered from the loss of trade with the hinterland, causing an economic decline. In Italy, the claim to Dalmatia relinquished in the Treaty of Rapallo contributed to fueling the myth of the mutilated victory. The myth was created during the Paris Peace Conference, where the Italian delegation was unable to enforce the Treaty of London, and perpetuated the view that Italy had won the war but its victory was compromised by an unjust peace.

The Treaty of Rapallo was also condemned by the Italian general Gabriele d'Annunzio, who previously had seized Rijeka with his troops, establishing there a state known as the Italian Regency of Carnaro. He resisted efforts to remove him from the city until the Italian Navy drove him out in the clash known as Bloody Christmas, so that the Free State of Fiume could be established. The city-state was abolished when Italy annexed the city four years later under the Treaty of Rome.

== Background ==
=== Treaty of London ===
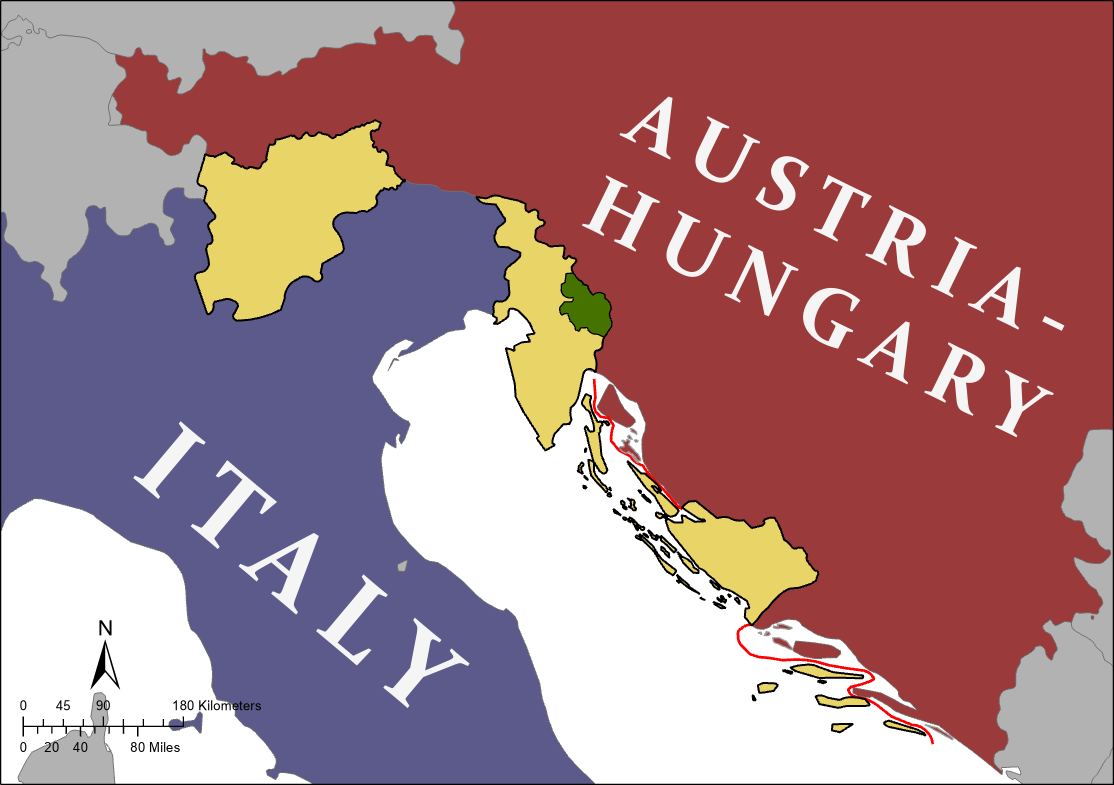
Territories promised to Italy, by the Entente, in the South Tyrol, the Austrian Littoral, and Dalmatia (tan), and the Snežnik Plateau area (green). However, after WWI, Dalmatia was assigned not to Italy but to Yugoslavia

In 1915, the Kingdom of Italy entered World War I on the side of the Entente, following the signing of the Treaty of London, which promised Italy territorial gains at the expense of Austria-Hungary. The treaty was opposed by representatives of the South Slavs living in Austria-Hungary, who were organised as the Yugoslav Committee.

Following the 3 November 1918 Armistice of Villa Giusti, the Austro-Hungarian surrender, Italian troops moved to occupy parts of the eastern Adriatic shore promised to Italy under the Treaty of London, ahead of the Paris Peace Conference. The State of Slovenes, Croats and Serbs, carved from areas of Austria-Hungary populated by the South Slavs, authorised the Yugoslav Committee to represent it abroad, and the short-lived state, shortly before it sought union with the Kingdom of Serbia to establish the Kingdom of Serbs, Croats and Slovenes, laid a competing claim to the eastern Adriatic to counter the Italian demands. This claim was supported by deployment of the Royal Serbian Army to the area. The United States Navy also deployed an occupying force to the coast.

=== Occupation of the eastern Adriatic ===
The Entente powers arranged zones-of-occupation of the eastern Adriatic shores as follows: the United Kingdom was to control the Kvarner Gulf, while the northern parts of Dalmatia were the Italian zone. The southern Dalmatian coast was to be occupied by the United States, while the shores of the Kingdom of Montenegro and the Principality of Albania, further to the south, were the responsibility of the French. The occupation forces were to be coordinated by the Naval Committee for the Adriatic, which consisted of admirals delegated by the four powers. The committee initially met in the city of Rijeka (Italian: Fiume), but it subsequently moved to Venice and Rome. The occupation plan was never fully enforced, as only Italy deployed a large force to the area. The local Croatian population often expressed dissatisfaction with the Italian military presence, and several minor clashes occurred in 1919. There were frequent cases of deportations of the non-Italian population by the Italian forces.

By the end of 1918, the Italian troops occupied Istria and Rijeka, as well as a part of the Dalmatian coast extending between, and including, the cities of Zadar and Šibenik, with the hinterland extending to Knin and Drniš. Additionally, they captured the islands of Hvar, Vis, Korčula, Mljet, Lastovo, and Pag. The US presence was largely confined to Split, while the Serbian army controlled the rest of the coast. In 1919, a group of Italian veterans led by Gabriele d'Annunzio seized Rijeka, establishing a short-lived state there known as the Italian Regency of Carnaro.

=== Paris Peace Conference ===
The problem of establishing the border between Italy and the Kingdom of Serbs, Croats and Slovenes—known as the Adriatic question—and the future status of Rijeka became major points of dispute at the Paris Peace Conference. Since 1917, Italy used the issue of the annexation of Montenegro by Serbia, or the unification of the countries, known as the Montenegrin question, to pressure Serbia into making concessions regarding Italian demands. Similarly, in 1920 and 1921, negotiations were conducted and agreements made—between the Croatian Committee of émigrés opposing establishment of the Kingdom of Serbs, Croats and Slovenes and D'Annunzio's representatives—offering territory to Italy in exchange for support for the Croatian Committee's work.

While the Italian representatives at the peace conference were demanding enforcement of the Treaty of London and the additional award of Rijeka, Woodrow Wilson opposed their demands and put forward his Fourteen Points, which favoured a solution that relied on local self-determination, arguing that the Treaty of London was invalid. The Italians claimed Fiume on the same principle, but disregarding its mainly Slavic suburb of Sušak. Wilson proposed a division of the Istrian peninsula along the Wilson Line that largely corresponded to the ethnic makeup of the population, and a free-city status for Rijeka based on the city's legal position of a Corpus separatum within Austria-Hungary. The British and French did not support enforcement of the treaty, as they thought Italy deserved relatively little due to its neutrality early in the war. Specifically, they were dismissive of Italian claims in Dalmatia. The British prime minister David Lloyd George only supported a free-city status for Zadar and Šibenik, while the French prime minister Georges Clemenceau only supported such a status for Zadar.

By late 1919, representatives of the Kingdom of Serbs, Croats and Slovenes, led by former Prime Minister Nikola Pašić and foreign minister Ante Trumbić, could not agree with Italian diplomats on the border question. In response, they were instructed to settle the issue through direct negotiations after the Paris Peace Conference. A particular obstacle to any agreement was D'Annunzio's occupation of Rijeka, which caused the Italian government to reject a draft agreement submitted by the UK, the US, and France. Pašić's and Trumbić's refusal to agree to the plan provoked the French and British to threaten that the Treaty of London would be enforced unless they supported the allied proposal. In turn, Wilson blocked the Franco-British move by threatening to stop ratification of the Treaty of Versailles by the US.

== Rapallo Conference ==
=== Negotiations ===
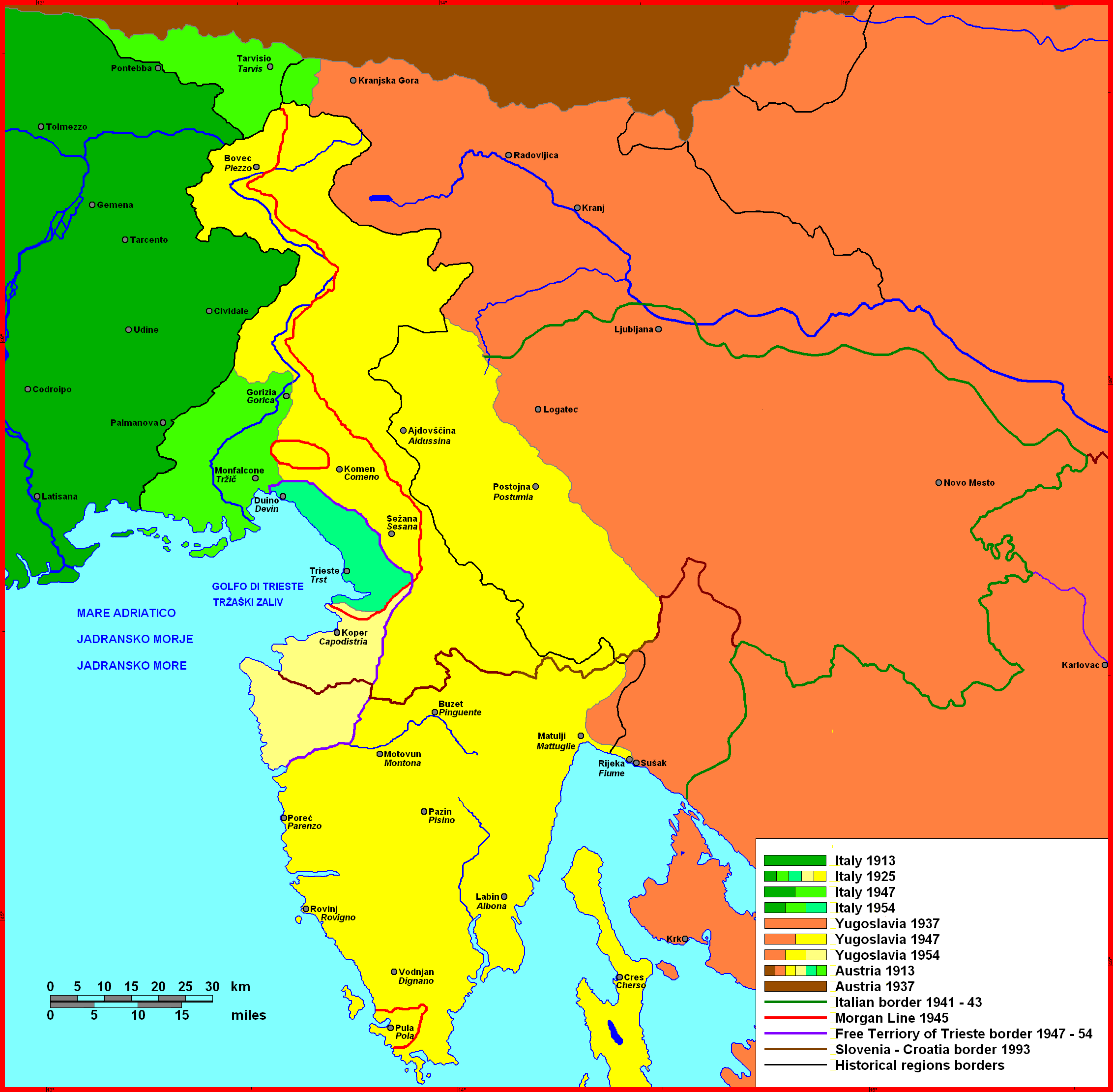
Changes to the Italian eastern border from 1920 to 1975. The Austrian Littoral, later renamed Venezia Giulia, that was assigned to Italy in 1920, with the Treaty of Rapallo (with adjustments of its border in 1924 after the Treaty of Rome), and that was then ceded to Yugoslavia in 1947 with the Treaty of Paris Areas annexed to Italy in 1920, and remaining Italian after 1947 Areas annexed to Italy in 1920, passed to the Free Territory of Trieste in 1947 with the Paris treaties, and definitively assigned to Italy in 1975 with the Treaty of Osimo Areas annexed to Italy in 1920, passed to the Free Territory of Trieste in 1947 with the Treaties of Paris, and definitively assigned to Yugoslavia in 1975 with the Treaty of Osimo

From spring 1920, the United Kingdom and France applied pressure on the prime minister of the Kingdom of Serbs, Croats and Slovenes, Milenko Radomar Vesnić, and foreign minister Trumbić to resolve the Adriatic question, claiming that it represented a threat to peace in Europe. At the same time, the Italian foreign minister, Carlo Sforza, indicated he was ready to trade Italian claims in Dalmatia for British and French backing of Italian territorial demands further north in Istria. In September 1920, Sforza told the President of France, Alexandre Millerand, that he only wanted to enforce the Treaty of London regarding Istria and that he wanted none of Dalmatia except the city of Zadar. Following the 1920 presidential election, US support for Wilson's ideas appeared to have ended, compelling Vesnić and Trumbić into bilateral negotiations with Sforza. Moreover, Prince Regent Alexander I, of the Kingdom of Serbs, Croats and Slovenes, wanted an agreement with Italy at any cost, wanting to achieve political stability in the country. According to Sforza, Vesnić later told him he was advised not to resist Italian demands for fear that Italy might impose a solution unilaterally. The Yugoslavs were suspicious of Salata, a Dalmatian irredentist, whom they claimed was acting "out of personal interest", so the Yugoslav delegates advised their minister to deal with Sforza directly, avoiding Salata.

A delegation from the Kingdom of Serbs, Croats and Slovenes was dispatched to Santa Margherita Ligure, in Italy, for bilateral negotiations. It was led by Vesnić, but the designated chief negotiatior was Trumbić. According to Svetozar Pribićević, this arrangement was made in Belgrade, in order to avoid the appearance that the Serbs were ceding to Italy territories inhabited by Croats and Slovenes. Therefore, Trumbić, as a Croat, would negotiate the treaty involving inevitable territorial concessions to Italy. Sforza's most recent proposal was supported by the British and French, while the US remained silent on the matter, leaving Belgrade isolated. In addition to Prime Minister Vesnić and Foreign Minister Trumbić, the ambassador of the Kingdom of Serbs, Croats and Slovenes to Rome Vojislav Antonijević was also among the principal members of that delegation. The principal members of the Italian negotiating team included Sforza, as well as Minister of War Ivanoe Bonomi and Giuseppe Volpi. Other members of the delegation included Marcello Roddolo, Francesco Salata, Alessandro Mattioli Pasqualini, and General Pietro Badoglio. During the negotiations, Sforza demanded Istria and the Snežnik (Italian: Monte Nevoso), claiming their symbolic significance to Italy and stating that they would not be relinquished by the Italian army in any case. In return, he offered Italian friendship. Negotiations took place between 9–11 November 1920, resulting in the treaty being signed on 12 November, in the Villa Spinola. Perhaps the most controversial issue was the delimitation of Zadar's border. Salata pointed out to Trumbić Italy's wish to annex, alongside Zadar, the island of Lastovo (Lagosta), and to not limit the annexation of Zadar to its urban area—a point on which Trumbić was adamant—because, without its surrounding territory, Zadar "would not be able to live." (Note: Salata was clear "If Zara were to be cut off from a more or less restricted territory, it would not be able to live. A city cannot live without water or a cemetery. [missing]. On the other hand, we cannot agree to Zara's transfer. Zara must remain Italian, because in Zara it is not possible to lower our flag once it has been raised.") The Italians proposed to cede Vis (Lissa) in exchange. The matter was settled on November 11 after a new conversation between Salata and Trumbić. The treaty is named after the comune of Rapallo where the villa is located. Italian Prime Minister Giovanni Giolitti came from Rome for the signing.

=== Terms ===
Article 1 of the treaty dealt with national borders in the northern Adriatic basin, giving Italy Istria and the territory to the north of the peninsula, demarcated by a line indicated by reference to prominent peaks in the area, running from the area of Tarvisio via Triglav to the east of Idrija and Postojna, to Snežnik, and then to the Kvarner Gulf just to the west of Rijeka. Thus, the major cities of Trieste, Pula, and Gorizia were acquired by Italy. Article 2 gave to Italy the city of Zadar (as the Province of Zara), in northern Dalmatia, and defined the semi-enclave's land boundaries by reference to surrounding peaks, villages, and tax-commune territories. Article 3 gave to Italy the islands of Cres, Lošinj, Lastovo, and Palagruža (referred to as Cherso, Lussin, Lagosta, and Pelagosta) with surrounding islets.

Article 4 of the treaty established the independent Free State of Fiume, defining its boundaries as those of the former Austro-Hungarian Corpus separatum, with the addition of a strip of land connecting it to the Italian territory in Istria between the Kvarner Gulf and the town of Kastav. This arrangement left the suburb of Sušak to the Kingdom of Serbs, Croats and Slovenes since it was situated across the Rječina River, just outside the Corpus separatum. Article 5 determined that the marking of the border on the ground would be carried out by a bilateral commission and that any disputes would be referred to the President of the Swiss Confederation. Article 6 required the parties to the treaty to convene, within two months, a conference of experts to draw up proposals for economic and financial cooperation between the parties to the treaty.

Article 7 of the treaty determined that Italian entities established in the Kingdom of Serbs, Croats and Slovenes, as well as Italians residing in that country, would retain all existing economic authorisations issued to them by the Kingdom or any of its predecessor-state governments. The same article allowed ethnic Italians to opt for Italian citizenship within a year. Those choosing Italian citizenship were guaranteed the right to remain residents of the Kingdom of Serbs, Croats and Slovenes, property rights, and freedom of religion. Finally, the same article provided that the Kingdom of Serbs, Croats and Slovenes would recognise any academic degrees obtained by Italian citizens as if they were obtained from institutions in that country. Article 8 called for enhanced educational cooperation between the parties to the treaty. Article 9 stated that the treaty was drawn up in Italian and Serbo-Croatian, but provided that the Italian version would be definitive in cases of dispute. The treaty was signed by Giolitti, Sforza, and Bonomi on behalf of Italy, and by Vesnić, Trumbić, and finance minister Kosta Stojanović on behalf of the Kingdom of Serbs, Croats and Slovenes.

== Aftermath ==
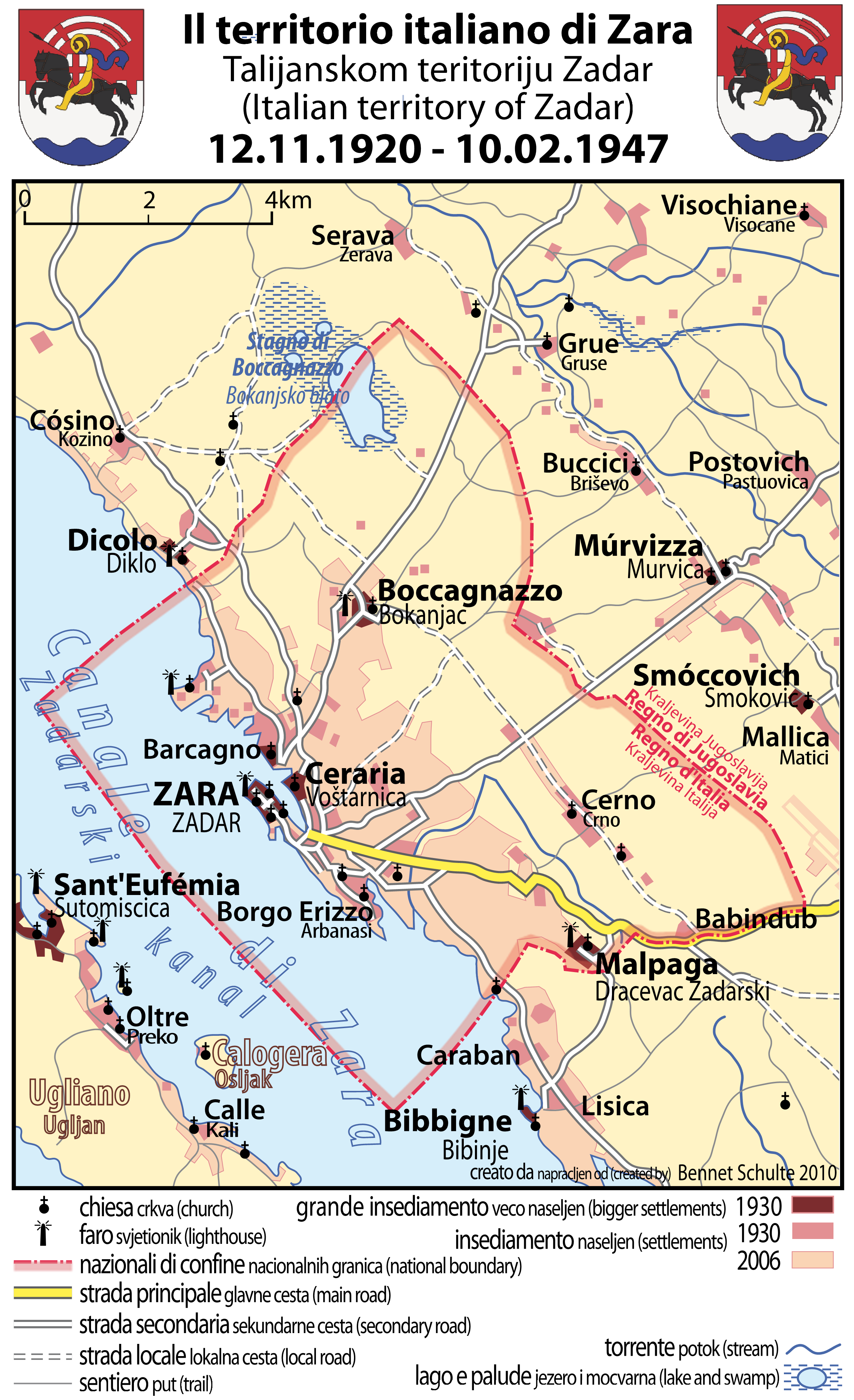
Map of the Italian territory of Zara, 1920-1947

A significant portion of the Treaty of Rapallo consisted of provisions regulating the status of Italians in the Kingdom of Serbs, Croats and Slovenes, but their number was low, estimated to be several hundred. On the other hand, the addition of the new Italian territory meant the addition of about a half a million South Slavs (mostly Slovenes and Croats) to the country's population. Even though the extent of the Italian territorial expansion was reduced in comparison to that promised by the Treaty of London, the Italian military was satisfied with the defensible land border and the naval facilities in Pula. It thought of Dalmatia as problematic to defend and primarily wanted to deny it to the Russian Empire, but the Russian threat was no longer a realistic prospect since the 1917 October Revolution. Politically, an agreement similar to the Treaty of Rapallo was likely possible at the Paris Peace Conference. However, the inability of the Italian delegation at that conference to enforce the Treaty of London, and annex Rijeka, fuelled the nationalistic myth of the mutilated victory. Following the Treaty of Rapallo, the myth persisted and the perception of political failure weakened liberal politicians.

On 6 December 1920, less than a month after resigning from the post of foreign minister, Trumbić gave a speech in Split where he remarked that grief over the loss of national territory was expected, adding that it was an inevitable outcome of the peace conference and the subsequent bilateral negotiations, though most of the Italian territorial gains were reversed in the aftermath of World War II. Nonetheless, Croats and Slovenes complained that their interests were sacrificed by Serbs. The Treaty of Rapallo (along with the death of Nicholas I of Montenegro a few months later) marked the end of Italian support for Montenegrin resistance against the Kingdom of Serbs, Croats and Slovenes. According to historian Srđa Pavlović, the signing of the treaty and the conclusion of the 1920 Kingdom of Serbs, Croats and Slovenes Constitutional Assembly election prompted the Entente powers to break off relations with the Montenegrin government-in-exile. Likewise, all Italian support for the Croatian Committee ended after the treaty was concluded. D'Annunzio condemned the treaty in a declaration of 17 November. The Italian Regency of Carnaro proclaimed a state of war four days later. The Italian Navy drove D'Annunzio from Rijeka in an intervention known as Bloody Christmas. The town became the city-state envisaged by the Treaty of Rapallo. Nonetheless, the Free State of Fiume was short-lived, and Italy annexed it under the 1924 Treaty of Rome. The loss of the hinterland served by the Port of Rijeka led to the decline of importance of both the port and the city, despite the introduction of free economic zone privileges. The same privileges were granted to Zadar, but its status of a semi-enclave limited its development too. Its population grew between 1921 and 1936 from 15,800 to 20,000, but a quarter of the residents were military personnel. At the same time, other cities in Dalmatia enjoyed much faster growth. This was especially true of Split, which became the regional capital instead of Zadar.

== Sources ==
- "The Treaty of Rapallo: Complete Official Text of the Italo-Jugoslav Pact, for the First Time Presented in English". Current History. 13 (2, Part II). Berkeley: University of California Press: 223–226. 1921. ISSN 0011-3530. JSTOR 45325919.
- Banac, Ivo (1984). The National Question in Yugoslavia: Origins, History, Politics. Ithaca: Cornell University Press. ISBN 0-8014-1675-2.
- Bartulović, Željko (2000). "Sušak u odnosima Kraljevine SHS i Italije 1918-1925" [Sušak in the Relations Between the Kingdom of Serbs, Croats and Slovenes and the Kingdom of Italy (1918-1925)]. Zbornik Pravnog fakulteta u Zagrebu (in Croatian). 50 (6). Zagreb: University of Zagreb: 957–988. ISSN 0350-2058.
- Batović, Ante; Kasalo, Branko (2021). "Great Britain and the Adriatic Question after World War I". In Bralić, Ante; Kasalo, Branko (eds.). The Eastern Adriatic Between the Collapse of the Habsburg Monarchy and the Creation of New States. Zadar: University of Zadar. pp. 299–330. ISBN 978-953-331-341-2.
- Burgwyn, H. James (1997). Italian Foreign Policy in the Interwar Period 1918–1940. Westport: Praeger Publishers. ISBN 9780275948771.
- Carteny, Andrea (2015). "Italy, End of the Great War and the Union of Montenegro with Serbia: Details from Italian Documentation". In Rudić, Srđan; Biagini, Antonello (eds.). Serbian-Italian Relations: History and Modern Times: Collection of Works. Belgrade: Institute of History Belgrade & Sapienza University of Rome. pp. 183–198. ISBN 9788677431099.
- Diklić, Marjan (2011). "Zadar i Rapallski ugovor (Uz 90. obljetnicu)" [Zadar and the Treaty of Rapallo (On the Occasion of the 90th Anniversary)]. Radovi Zavoda za povijesne znanosti HAZU u Zadru (in Croatian) (53). Zagreb: Croatian Academy of Sciences and Arts: 223–242. ISSN 1330-0474.
- Graovac, Vera (2004). "Populacijski razvoj Zadra" [Zadar Population Development]. Geoadria (in Croatian). 9 (1). Zadar: Croatian Geographical Society, University of Zadar: 51–72. doi:10.15291/geoadria.129. ISSN 1331-2294.
- Hehn, Paul N. (2005). A Low, Dishonest Decade: The Great Powers, Eastern Europe and the Economic Origins of World War II. London: A & C Black. ISBN 9780826417619.
- Hill, Chesney (1934). The Doctrine of "rebus sic stantibus" in International Law. Vol. IX. Columbia: University of Missouri. OCLC 1876470.
- Kernek, Sterling J. (1982). "Woodrow Wilson and National Self-Determination along Italy's Frontier: A Study of the Manipulation of Principles in the Pursuit of Political Interests". Proceedings of the American Philosophical Society. 126 (4). Philadelphia: American Philosophical Society: 243–300. ISSN 0003-049X. JSTOR 0003049X.
- Knox, MacGregor (2007). To the Threshold of Power, 1922/33: Origins and Dynamics of the Fascist and Nationalist Socialist Dictatorships. Vol. I. Cambridge: Cambridge University Press. ISBN 978-0-521-87860-9.
- Lowe, Cedric J.; Marzari, Frank (1975). Italian Foreign Policy 1870–1940. Vol. VIII. London: Routledge. ISBN 978-0-415-27372-5.
- MacMillan, Margaret (2002). Paris 1919: Six Months That Changed the World. New York City: Random House Publishing Group. ISBN 9780375760525.
- Matijević, Zlatko (2008). "Narodno vijeće Slovenaca, Hrvata i Srba u Zagrebu: Osnutak, djelovanje i nestanak (1918/1919)" [National Council of Slovenes, Croats and Serbs in Zagreb: Founding, Actions and Disappearance (1918/1919)]. Fontes: Izvori Za Hrvatsku Povijest (in Croatian). 14 (1). Zagreb: Croatian State Archives: 35–66. ISSN 1330-6804.
- Matković, Stjepan (2008). "Prilozi za politički životopis Ive Franka i evoluciju pravaštva" [Contributions for a Political Biography of Ivo Frank and Evolution of the Party of Rights Ideology]. Časopis za suvremenu povijest (in Croatian). 40 (3). Zagreb: Croatian Institute of History: 1067–1086. ISSN 1848-9079.
- Melchionni, Maria Grazia, ed. (2021). "Documenti iconografici" [Pictorial Documents]. Rivista di Studi Politici Internazionali (in Italian). 88 (3). Rome: Edizioni Studium S.r.l.: 449–454. ISBN 9788838251498.
- Merlicco, Giordano (2021). "Between old Austria and new foes: Italy and the Yugoslav project (1917-1918)" (PDF). Istorijski Zapisi. XCIV (1–2). Podgorica: Istorijski institut Crne Gore: 115–138. ISSN 0021-2652.
- Morgan, Philip (2004). Italian Fascism, 1915–1945. New York: Palgrave Macmillan. ISBN 978-1-4039-3251-8.
- Pavlović, Srdja (2008). Balkan Anschluss: The Annexation of Montenegro and the Creation of the Common South Slavic State. West Lafayette: Purdue University Press. ISBN 978-1-557-53465-1.
- Pavlowitch, Kosta St. (2003). "The First World War and Unification of Yugoslavia". In Djokic, Dejan (ed.). Yugoslavism: Histories of a Failed Idea, 1918–1992. London: C. Hurst & Co. pp. 27–41. ISBN 1-85065-663-0.
- Perica, Vjekoslav (2010). "Međunarodna mirovna misija u Splitu nakon Prvog svjetskog rata (1918.–1921.) prema arhivu Ratne mornarice SAD-a i drugim izvorima" [International Peace Mission in Split After the World War I (1918 - 1921) from the Perspective of the United States Navy]. Časopis za suvremenu povijest (in Croatian). 42 (1). Zagreb: Croatian Institute of History: 127–156. ISSN 1848-9079.
- Perinčić, Tea (2022). "Grad Rijeka u 20. stoljeću: Narodi-nacije, sukobi, granice, migracije" [The City of Rijeka in the 20th Century: Nations, Conflicts, Borders, Migrations]. Povijest U Nastavi (in Croatian). 33 (1). Zagreb: Društvo za hrvatsku povijesnicu: 109–116. ISSN 1334-1375.
- Pizzi, Katia (2001). A City in Search of an Author. London: Sheffield Academic Press. ISBN 9780567244970.
- Ramet, Sabrina P. (2006). The Three Yugoslavias: State-building and Legitimation, 1918–2005. Bloomington: Indiana University Press. ISBN 9780253346568.
- Repe, Božo (2008). "Vloga slovenskih politikov in diplomatov pri določanju meja" [Delimitation of Frontiers – Role of Slovenian Politicians and Diplomats]. Adrias: Zbornik radova Zavoda za znanstveni i umjetnički rad Hrvatske akademije znanosti i umjetnosti u Splitu (in Slovenian) (15). Zagreb: Croatian Academy of Sciences and Arts: 109–117. ISSN 0352-9924.
- Rudolf, Davorin (2008). "Granice s Italijom u mirovnim ugovorima nakon Prvoga i Drugog svjetskog rata" [Borders With Italy in Peace Treaties Following World War I and World War II]. Adrias: Zbornik radova Zavoda za znanstveni i umjetnički rad Hrvatske akademije znanosti i umjetnosti u Splitu (in Croatian) (15). Zagreb: Croatian Academy of Sciences and Arts: 61–80. ISSN 0352-9924.
- Santoro, Stefano (2023). "The Italian Press and Public Debate on the Eastern Borders during the Paris Peace Conference". In Arhire, Sorin; Roşu, Tudor; Anghel, Călin (eds.). The Paris Peace Conference and Its Consequences in Early-1920s Europe. Newcastle upon Tyne: Cambridge Scholars Publishing. pp. 85–108. ISBN 978-1-5275-0235-2.
