= South African question =

The South African question may refer to two national questions concerning South Africa:

- The South African Wars (1879–1915)
- Apartheid in South Africa

== See also ==
- Namibian question
