= Imperial and Royal Naval Academy =

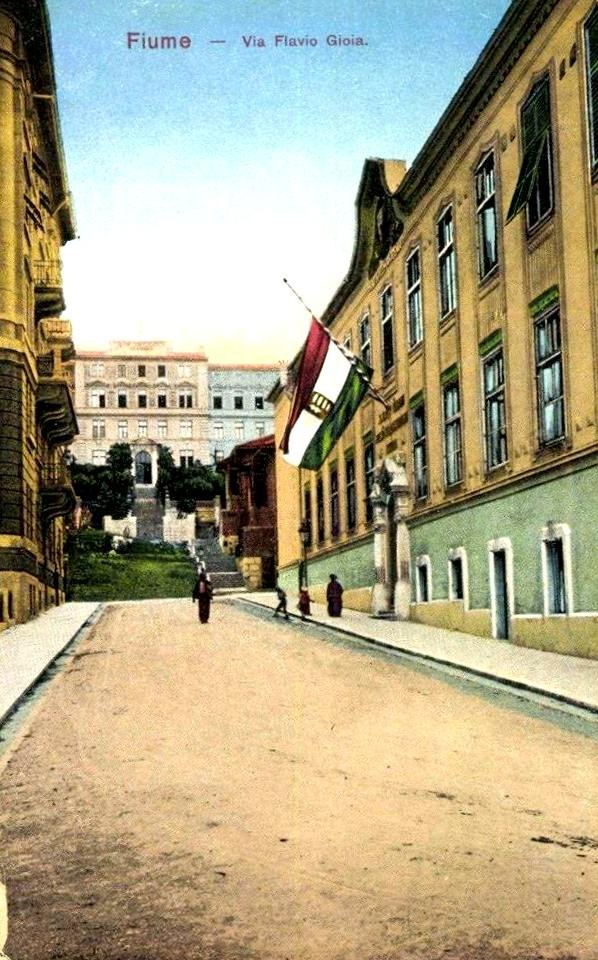
The Naval Academy at Fiume, about 1902

The Imperial and Royal Naval Academy at Trieste in the Austrian Littoral and later at Fiume, Hungary (now Rijeka in Croatia), founded in 1802 at Venice as the Imperial Naval Cadet School, was the training college for all naval officers of the Austrian Navy, which in 1869 became the Imperial and Royal Navy of Austria-Hungary. Both the navy and the academy came to an end in 1918, when the Habsburg empire splintered into nation-states.

== Background ==
A small Austrian Navy was established in 1786, with Joseph II, Holy Roman Emperor and Archduke of Austria, buying two twenty-gun cutters in Ostend and sending them to the Imperial Free City of Trieste. The French Revolution of 1789 and the French Revolutionary Wars which followed it led to an expansion of the Austrian Navy and the creation of a naval base at Trieste.

At the Treaty of Campo Formio (1797), the Habsburg monarchy and the French First Republic divided the assets of the fallen Republic of Venice, Austria gaining the city of Venice itself, Venetian Dalmatia, Istria, Terraferma, and what was left of the Venetian navy after the French had seized its best warships. What was left for Austria was ten ships of the line, seven frigates and corvettes, and dozens of gunboats and small ships, about half of the fleet.

Needing a supply of naval officers, on 17 March 1802, Archduke Charles, Duke of Teschen, as Inspector General of the Navy, ordered the formation of a Naval Cadet School in Venice (German: Marine-Kadettenschule).

== History ==
The Naval Cadet School was in Venice for more than forty years, but had some turbulent times there, caused by the Austrians losing, regaining, and then losing again the city of Venice. In 1848, the school moved to Trieste, and in 1852 it was given the name Imperial and Royal Naval Academy (German: k.u.k. Marine-Akademie).

Due to the expansion of Trieste, the decision was taken to move the academy again, to Fiume. The foundation stone of the new Naval Academy was laid there on 26 March 1856, in the presence of the Commander-in-Chief of the Imperial and Royal Navy, Archduke Ferdinand Maximilian, later Emperor of Mexico. The buildings, consisting of a south-facing main building and two side wings, were completed on 3 October 1857. They remained little changed until the end of the academy and the Habsburg empire.

Until 1871, the academy had no fixed scheme of admission. Admiral Maximilian Daublebsky von Sterneck was port commander at Pola, which with its large natural harbour was Austria-Hungary's main naval base and a major shipbuilding centre. He wrote to his wife

"We have here a training ship for cabin-boys. To begin with, the aristocracy, the officers, and the civil servants supplied us with the largest contingent of good-for-nothing boys, believing that if nothing else worked, the boys' ship would help. It didn't help. They were all chased away, and nowadays, no such sprouts are even accepted."

Daublebsky pressed for major reforms, and from 1871 before applying to become cadets boys needed to complete the lower secondary school years and then to pass an entrance examination. The curriculum of the academy was expanded to include 31 subjects, including German, Italian, French or English, oceanography, meteorology, naval architecture and engineering, naval tactics and manoeuvring, maritime law, signalling, and rigging.

The academy was designed to teach 180 pupils, who were called Seeaspiranten when first admitted, but in its later years it took in more than that number. Supply officers were trained on a hulk at Pola called Bellona. There was another training hulk at Pola for the aspirants, called Feuerspeyer, which was also used by the Artillery School at Pola. The aspirants became midshipmen (Kadetten) and completed their academic studies on another training ship at Pola, Custozza. At the end of each term, there was a cruise on a training ship, and for practical naval experience the midshipmen joined ships of the fleet. Successful pupils left the academy with the rank of Fähnrich, but still had to complete further special training, such as in mining, artillery, or torpedoes.

The only member of the ruling Habsburg family who at his own request was a student at the academy was Archduke Leopold Ferdinand of Austria, who entered it in 1883 and graduated at the top of his class in 1887. The Archduke later wrote that the Emperor Franz Joseph had given his consent reluctantly, seeing the naval officer corps as "a disgustingly democratic institution... largely composed of sons of the haute bourgeoisie", and believing that the other boys in the academy would be unfit companions for a Habsburg prince.

During the First World War, Austria-Hungary was at war with the Kingdom of Italy, and for security reasons the academy was moved away from Fiume, first to Schloss Hof in Lower Austria and then to Braunau am Inn on the border with Switzerland. It was still there when the fighting ended in 1918. In October 1918, Austria-Hungary broke up and its navy was transferred to the new State of Slovenes, Croats and Serbs. In November 1918 came the Allied occupation of the eastern Adriatic. Both Austria and Hungary emerged from the war with no coastline and no sea-ports, other than those on the Danube. Most of the Imperial and Royal Danube Flotilla was stationed in Hungary, which took over eight of the nine armoured gunboats, only one staying in Austria, and Hungary also got all eight armored patrol boats. This division was later revisited.

The academy's former building in Fiume (now Rijeka) has been occupied since the 1920s by the city's Infectious Disease Subsidiary Hospital.

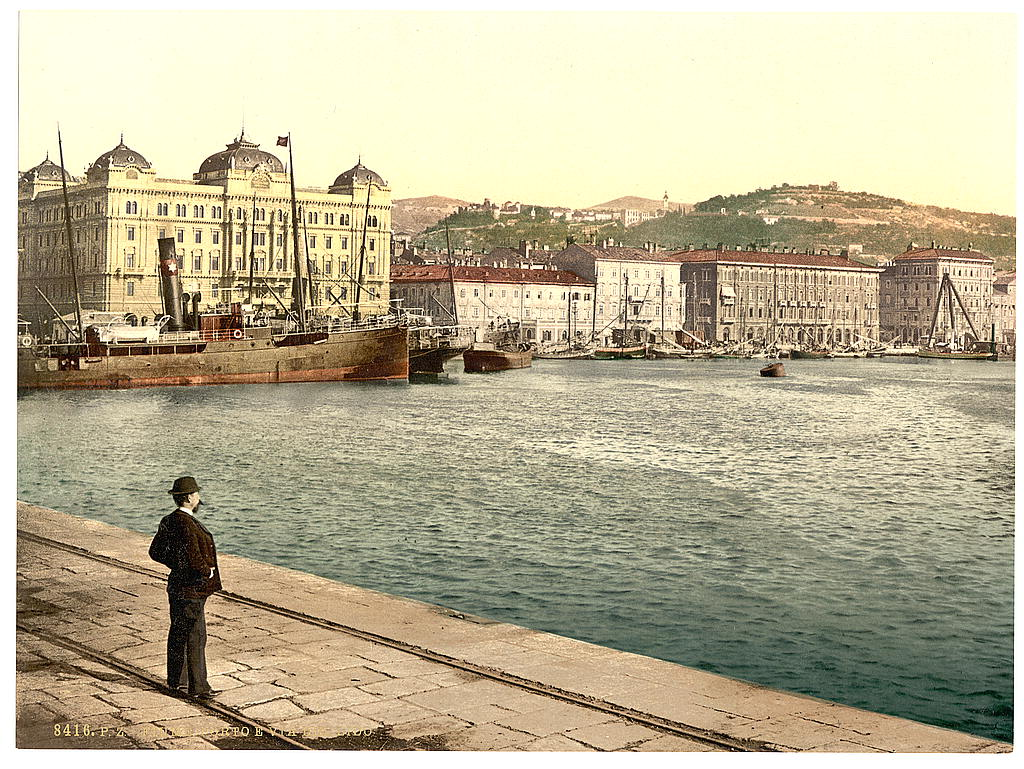
Fiume Harbour, about 1900

== See also ==
- Imperial and Royal Technical Military Academy
