= National Liberation War =

The National Liberation War may refer to:

- World War II in Yugoslavia
- World War II in Yugoslav Macedonia
- World War II in Albania
- Rhodesian Bush War
- Turkish War of Independence

== See also ==
- Wars of national liberation
- National liberation (Marxism)
- List of wars of independence
- War (disambiguation)
