= Adriatic question =

Post First World War international relations issue

In the aftermath of the First World War, the Adriatic question or Adriatic problem concerned the fate of the territories along the eastern coast of the Adriatic Sea that formerly belonged to the Austro-Hungarian Empire. The roots of the dispute lay in the secret Treaty of London, signed during the war (26 April 1915), and in growing nationalism, especially Italian irredentism and Yugoslavism, which led ultimately to the creation of Yugoslavia. The question was a major barrier to agreement at the Paris Peace Conference, but was partially resolved by the Treaty of Rapallo between Italy and Yugoslavia on 12 November 1920.

== Background ==
Austria-Hungary exited the war on 3 November 1918, when it ordered its troops to cease fighting. The Armistice of Villa Giusti, signed with Italy that day, took effect on 4 November, and on 13 November the Armistice of Belgrade was signed with Italy's allies on the Balkan front. Italy began immediately to occupy territories ceded to it by the treaty of 1915, while simultaneously the South Slavs formed local governments in opposition to both Italian expansion and Austro-Hungarian authority. A National Council of Slovenes, Croats and Serbs was set up in Zagreb on 5–6 October, and the State of Slovenes, Croats and Serbs was proclaimed there on 29 October and that same day the Sabor, the legitimate parliament of Croatia-Slavonia, declared independence from Austria-Hungary. On 1 December the Kingdom of Serbs, Croats and Slovenes (later Yugoslavia) was formed in Belgrade by union of this new state with Serbia and Montenegro.

== Arguments ==
=== Populations ===
The main argument presented by Yugoslavia was that the territories under consideration contained about seven million Slavs, almost the entire population.

Place	Yugoslav population	Percentage	Italian population	Percentage
Dalmatia	610,669	96%	18,028	2.8%
Fiume (Rijeka)	15,687; 26,602 incl. Sušak	–	24,212; 25,781 incl. Sušak	–
Gorizia and Gradisca	154,564	61%	90,009	36%
Istria	223,318; Western zone: 58,373; Eastern zone: 135,290	57%	147,417; Western zone: 129,903; Eastern zone: 6,686	38%
Trieste (Trst)	56,916	29.8%	118,959	62.3%

Of the Dalmatian islands, only Lošinj (Lussin) had an Italian majority. When the hinterland of Fiume was included along with its suburbs the Yugoslav majority increased further. The Italian claim on Gorizia and Gradisca was generally recognised, as was its claim on the Slavic settlements around Friuli.

At the Congress of Oppressed Nationalities of the Austro-Hungarian Empire in Rome (8–10 April 1918), Italy lent official support to the Declaration of Corfu (20 July 1917), a Yugoslavist document supported by Britain and France that expressed the need to unite the South Slavs politically.

=== Geography ===
The Italians argued that the natural geographic boundary of Italy included the Julian and Dinaric Alps, and that therefore the Austro-Hungarian littoral lay within geographic Italy. The strategic importance of the geography of the eastern coast of the Adriatic has been generally accepted. The Chief of the Division of Boundary Geography with the American delegation to the Paris Peace Conference, Douglas Wilson Johnson, wrote at the time, "Any naval power on the [Adriatic] eastern coast must find itself possessing immense advantages over Italy." Johnson went on to note that the offer of Pula (Pola), Vlorë (Valona) and a central Dalmatian island group to the Italians effectively settled the strategic problem and balanced the two Adriatic powers.

== Allied occupation ==
=== Joint occupation of Fiume ===
On 29 October 1918 the Austro-Hungarians evacuated Fiume, and the new Croatian mayor, Rikard Lenac, proclaimed the town's adherence to the National Council of the State of Slovenes, Croats and Serbs. On 30 October the Italian community set up a "national council" headed by Antonio Grossich and proclaimed Fiume's union with Italy. The next day the local governor handed over power to the Italians, as did the governor of Trieste. On 4 November an Italian naval detachment under Admiral Guglielmo Rainer aboard the battleship Emanuele Filiberto arrived in the harbour of Fiume. Rainer declared the local government dissolved and, on 14 November Italian Prime Minister Vittorio Orlando, acting on the advice of Chief of Staff Armando Diaz, ordered Rainer to land a troop of marines. The next day (15 November) Diaz requested that Allied troops take part in the occupation of Fiume. The commander of British forces on the Italian Front, the Earl of Cavan, was ordered to send a company "to show that the occupation is allied, and to keep order". That same day 2,000 Serbian soldiers arrived on the outskirts of Fiume.

France and the United States also sent naval contingents to Fiume, and on 17 November some American, British and French naval officers met with Mayor Lenac and Ivan Lorković, a delegate from the Slovene–Croat–Serb state, in the abandoned governor's palace. It was agreed that the Serb troops should evacuate the area that afternoon and that the Italian marines should not be landed for another three days, pending orders from the Supreme Council of the Paris Peace Conference. Although Rainer agreed, he was countermanded by his superior, on the grounds that he had acted without instruction, and an Italian troops force eighty strong entered the city that afternoon. They ordered Lenac's government out of the palace and removed all Serbian flags on public display. On 18 November the National Council of Slovenes, Croats and Serbs officially protested to the allied commanders. The arrival of an American battalion on 19 November prevented any outbreak of violence, but the Italians eventually posted 12,000 troops in the city—"an Italian military occupation in overwhelming force, for political reasons" wrote Admiral Edward Kiddle, and Commodore Howard Kelly, commanding the British Adriatic Force, could remark on 22 November that "the Italian occupation has all the appearance of an annexation to the Italian Crown."

=== Establishment of a naval commission ===
When Italy first began occupying land east of the Tagliamento, the former boundary between Italy and Austria-Hungary, it employed troops of the 332nd Infantry Regiment of the United States (which were under Italian command on the Italian Front), with the goal of appearing to be an international occupation force. Although this misuse of American troops led the United States War Department to order them withdrawn, President Woodrow Wilson countermanded the order to prevent a breakdown in negotiations over the Adriatic question in Paris. Thereafter, as a result, the international control for the Adriatic was a naval responsibility.

On 16 November 1918 representatives of the Allied navies—American, British, French and Italian—met in Venice to establish the Naval Commission (or Committee) for the Adriatic. At several sessions held in Rome from 26 November, the commission decided the fate of the Austro-Hungarian fleet and of its coastline. The fleet was divided in control between the Americans, French and Italians pending a final political decision regarding its fate, while the coast was divided into three zones of control, an Italian in the north (mainly corresponding to the Austrian Littoral), an American in the middle (mainly Dalmatia) and a French in the south (mainly Albania). This arrangement eventually received political ratification in Paris. Josephus Daniels, United States Secretary of the Navy, wrote to his Chief of Naval Operations, William S. Benson, also American naval advisor to the Paris Peace Commission, that "due to possible Adriatic developments and [American] desire to show sympathy with [the] Slavonic government being formed in the late Austro-Hungarian Empire, consider it desirable to send flag officer ... immediately into the Adriatic." Benson later wrote to Admiral William H. G. Bullard, commanding American naval forces in their zone, that "the general principles laid down by the President", i.e. the Fourteen Points, which stressed national self-determination, should be furthered, implying active American support for Yugoslav nationhood.

=== Split incident ===
The Naval Commission began its work in Fiume in early December, but in January the Italian representative, Admiral Vittorio Mola, resigned in protest. At the demands of the American, British and French admirals, Italy appointed Rear Admiral Ugo Rombo to replace him on 1 February 1919. At a meeting in Venice on 8 February Rombo told Admiral Albert Parker Niblack that the Americans did not understand the Adriatic problem, leading to a breakdown in negotiations between the Italians and the rest. In the end the Commission's report was not publicised.

When the Commission moved to Split, the admirals tasked the Yugoslavs with maintaining order, but on 24 February some Yugoslav (mostly Croat) citizens attacked some Italian officers meeting with local Italianophiles. Rombo demanded the Allies patrol the city, but Niblack and Benson vetoed it.

=== American occupation zone ===
In Dalmatia, the American occupation zone, the citizens had elected a provisional assembly and a governor, and both supported the nascent State of Slovenes, Croats and Serbs. Order was kept by the local militia, which was often unreliable, and by Serbian troops which had begun to garrison the area in small numbers. This arrangement was supported by the Americans, but "[b]y early 1919, disturbed local conditions forced the [Naval] Committee for the Adriatic to circulate four armed inter-allied patrols night and day throughout the area under the command of the American admiral." After a few months of this the Admiral Bullard supplanted the inter-allied patrol with a patrol composed entirely of Americans to assist the local police in maintaining order for a few hours each day.

Several times Italian troops crossed the frontier into the American zone of occupation, but in each case they were turned back, either by a warning or, in one case, by the arrival of American warships and landing of American forces. In several towns the Americans posted notice that they would protect the lives and property of Dalmatians against any Italian injustice. This latter sort of propaganda was the most effective means of keeping the peace, since the American admiral had to rely on Serbian troops for garrisoning the interior. His own garrison was minuscule, and reinforcements were only landed in emergencies. One Yugoslav mayor from the Italian zone sent a letter of thanks to the American admiral for protecting his people from the Italians.

The first effort to bring American naval forces in the Adriatic home took place in December 1919. In February 1920 the Italians requested four Austro-Hungarian ships allocated to Italy by the Allied Military Committee of Versailles and which were being guarded at Split by American forces. The Italian ambition to receive these vessels led to the decision to retain American ships in the Adriatic longer. The American occupation ended only after the Italian forces had evacuated their zone and the International Committee for the Destruction of Enemy Warships had allocated all the formerly Austro-Hungarian vessels under its command to the Italian Navy. The last American troops left aboard the USS Reuben James on 29 September 1921, after the Treaty of Rapallo had been signed.

== Negotiations ==
The negotiations attending the Adriatic question at the Paris Peace Conference may be divided into three periods based on the dominant Italian personality of the time: January–June 1919, the Baron Sonnino period; June–September 1919, the Tittoni period; and 12 September – 9 December 1919, the d'Annunzio period.

=== Wilson Line ===
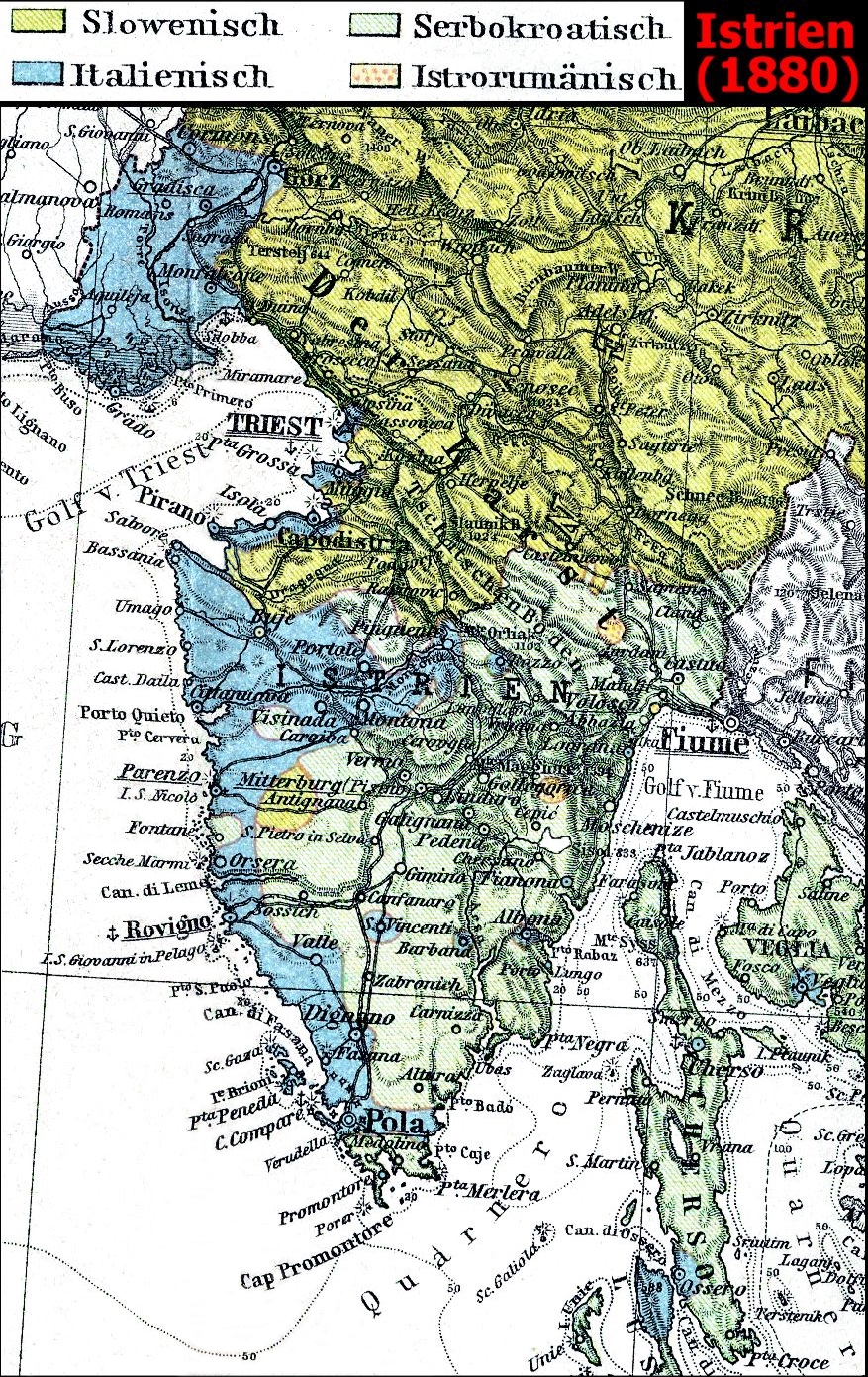
The Trieste-Pula railway was deep in
ethnically Croat territory

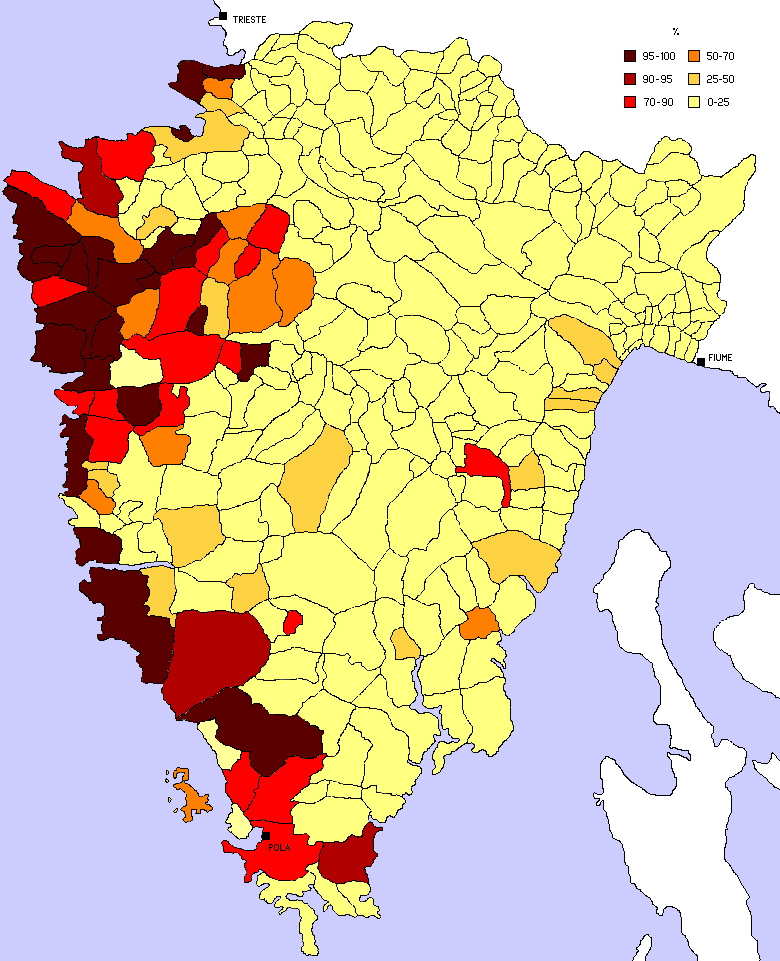
The Italian community in Istria (38%) was concentrated on its western coast. Croats formed the majority in the rest of the peninsula, with Slovenes in the north

External image
- Peace proposals: Wilson and Morgan lines

From January until June 1919 negotiations were dominated by Baron Sidney Sonnino, the Italian Foreign Minister, who divided and conquered his allies, forcing Britain and France to acquiesce in the Treaty of London and endeavouring to negotiate directly with America from a position of strength. At the same time he whipped up the Italian people with nationalistic propaganda. When the government of Orlando was replaced by that of Francesco Saverio Nitti on 23 June, Sonnino was replaced by Tommaso Tittoni. The nationalist fervour he had stoked, however, broke into open violence in Fiume, where, on 6 July 1919, an element of the Italian population massacred some of the occupying French soldiers.

On 15 April President Wilson issued a memorandum proposing a line, the so-called "Wilson Line", dividing the Istrian peninsula between Italy and Yugoslavia. Trieste and Pula, with the railway connecting them, lay on the Italian side; Fiume and Ljubljana (Laibach), with the railway connecting them, on the Yugoslav. Učka (Monte Maggiore) was to be Italian, but the Wilson Line ran further west of Fiume than that of the Treaty of London. Italy would have none of the rights in northern Dalmatia granted it by that treaty, but it would receive the islands of Vis (Lissa) and Lošinj (Lussin). The Yugoslav fleet, inherited from Austria-Hungary, was to be reduced, and the area of the frontier demilitarised generally. The Italians alleged that the Wilson line did not give sufficient protection to the Trieste–Pula railway.

Tittoni altered the course of negotiations by abandoning the Treaty of London and strengthening the Franco-Italian alliance, but he did not accept President Wilson's proposed "line". The French diplomat André Tardieu worked as an intermediary between Tittoni and the Americans, and he first suggested the creation of a buffer state out of a strip of land around Fiume, the future Free State of Fiume. The main American objection at the time was that the buffer state denied its inhabitants the right of self-determination.

=== Memoranda and compromise ===
On 12 September 1919, Gabriele d'Annunzio led a band of disaffected soldiers of the Granatieri di Sardegna in a march on Fiume—the so-called impresa di Fiume ("Fiume enterprise")—defying the international commission and the governments of Italy and Yugoslavia. Tittoni petitioned the international community, represented by French Prime Minister Georges Clemenceau after the American and British heads of government had both gone home, and the Yugoslav government for time to allow Italy to rein in d'Annunzio. In October he proposed that Fiume itself and a coastal strip leading to it should be conceded to Italy, that besides Lošinj and Vis she should possess the islands of Cres (Cherso) and Lastovo (Lagosta) and that the city of Zadar (Zara) should be a free city under Italian protection.

After the departure of the president, Frank Polk headed up the American Commission to Negotiate Peace in Paris. He was the driving force behind the memorandum of 9 December, signed by American, British and French delegates. This statement denied the Italians Fiume and most Yugoslav islands and even restricted their mandate over Albania. This memorandum was quickly abandoned by the British and French, whose prime ministers signed a compromise with their Italian counterpart on 14 January 1920 without American participation. Therein it was agreed to concede Fiume and a coastal strip to Italy and in exchange hive off the northern part of Albania and give it to Yugoslavia. To gain the latter's acceptance the signatories of the new compromise threatened to otherwise enforce the Treaty of London.

This last compromise aroused the anger of President Wilson, who, in a statement issued 10 February, denounced it as "a positive denial of the principles for which America entered the war". He threatened to withdraw the United States from the Treaty of Versailles and from the Franco-American agreement of the past June. On 26 February, Clemenceau and British Prime Minister David Lloyd George published a note offering to disavow the January compromise and suggesting that the memorandum of December be similarly sidelined. They expressed their wish to see Yugoslavia and Italy negotiate directly, and, contrary to Wilson's desire, stood by their intention to enforce the Treaty of London if all else failed. It was suggested by some at the time that Lloyd George had personally frustrated the efforts of Wilson by a private agreement with Nitti whereby the latter would support Britain against France on the Eastern (i.e., Russian and Turkish) Question.

== Aftermath ==
On 12 September 1919, D'Annunzio occupied the city of Rijeka (Fiume) and proclaimed the Italian Regency of Carnaro, but the approval of the Treaty of Rapallo on 12 November 1920 turned the territory into an independent state, the Free State of Fiume. Other parts of the Treaty of Rapallo were supposed to solve the dispute between the Kingdom of Italy and the Kingdom of Serbs, Croats and Slovenes (renamed Yugoslavia in 1929). It included Italian annexation of parts of Carniola, several Adriatic islands, and the city of Zadar (Zara).

== See also ==
- Albanian question
- Montenegrin question
- Distribution of Austro-Hungarian Navy
