= United Nations General Assembly Resolution 34/37 =

UN General Assembly Resolution 34/37
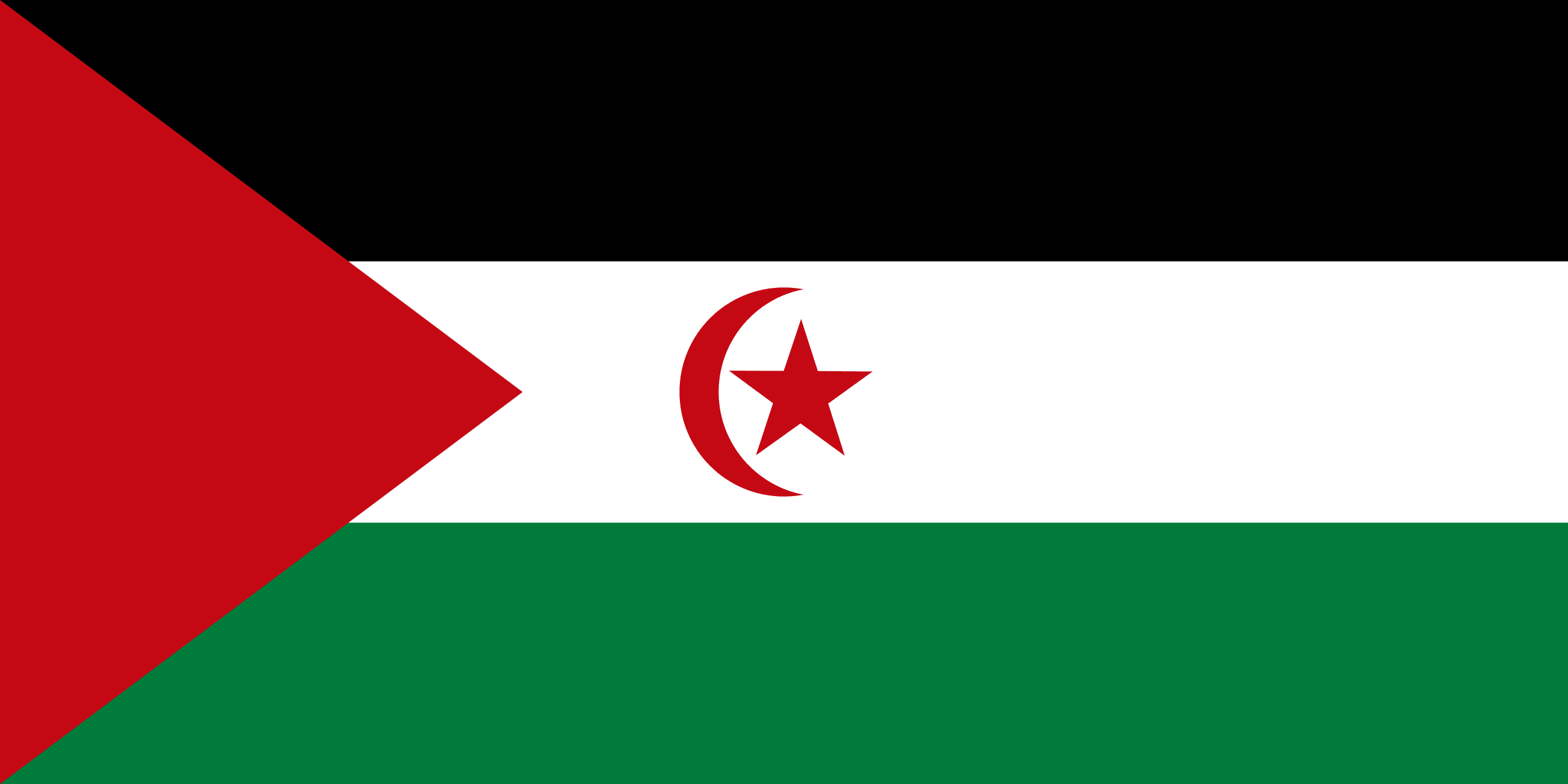
- Flag of the Sahrawi Arab Democratic Republic
- Date: 21 November 1979
- Meeting no.: A/34/PV.75
- Code: A/RES/34/37 (Document)
- Subject: Question of Western Sahara
- Voting summary: 85 voted for; 6 voted against; 41 abstained
- Result: Adopted

United Nations General Assembly Resolution 34/37, titled Question of Western Sahara, is a resolution of the United Nations General Assembly about the situation in Western Sahara, which was adopted on 21 November 1979 at the 34th session of the General Assembly. It became the eighteenth United Nations General Assembly document concerning the situation of that territory.

The resolution reaffirmed "the inalienable right of the people of Western Sahara to self-determination and independence, in accordance with the Charter of the United Nations, the Charter of the Organization of African Unity and the objectives of the UN General Assembly Resolution 1514, and the legitimacy of their struggle to secure the enjoyment of that right." It also welcomes the Algiers Agreement between Mauritania and the Polisario Front as an "important contribution to the process of achieving peace", while "deeply deplores the aggravation of the situation resulting from the continued occupation of Western Sahara by Morocco and the extension of that occupation to the territory recently evacuated by Mauritania", urging Morocco to "join in the peace process and to terminate the occupation of the territory of Western Sahara".

== Draft resolution ==
On 21 November 1979, the United Nations General Assembly adopted resolution A/RES/34/37 by a recorded vote of 85 in favour to 6 against, with 41 abstentions and 20 countries not voting. The table below shows related voting results:

For	Against	Abstain
Afghanistan	Central African Republic	Bahrain
Albania	Equatorial Guinea	Bangladesh
Algeria	Gabon	Belgium
Angola	Guatemala	Burma
Argentina	Morocco	Canada
Australia	Saudi Arabia	Chad
Austria		Chile
Bahamas		Colombia
Barbados		Denmark
Benin		Egypt
Bhutan		France
Botswana		Federal Republic of Germany
Brazil		Iceland
Bulgaria		Indonesia
Burundi		Ireland
Byelorussian SSR		Israel
Cape Verde		Italy
Congo		Ivory Coast
Costa Rica		Japan
Cuba		Jordan
Cyprus		Lebanon
Czechoslovakia		Luxembourg
Democratic Yemen		Malaysia
Ecuador		Netherlands
El Salvador		New Zealand
Ethiopia		Norway
Fiji		Paraguay
Finland		Philippines
German Democratic Republic		Portugal
Ghana		Qatar
Greece		Spain
Grenada		Thailand
Guinea-Bissau		Tunisia
Guyana		Turkey
Haiti		United Arab Emirates
Honduras		United Kingdom
Hungary		United Republic of Cameroon
India		United States
Iran		Uruguay
Jamaica		Yemen Arab Republic
Kenya		Zaire
Laos		
Lesotho		
Liberia		
Libya		
Madagascar		
Malawi		
Mali		
Malta		
Mauritania		
Mexico		
Mongolia		
Mozambique		
Nepal		
Nicaragua		
Niger		
Nigeria		
Pakistan		
Panama		
Papua New Guinea		
Peru		
Poland		
Rwanda		
Saint Lucia		
Samoa		
São Tomé and Príncipe		
Seychelles		
Singapore		
Sri Lanka		
Sudan		
Suriname		
Swaziland		
Sweden		
Syria		
Togo		
Trinidad and Tobago		
Uganda		
Ukrainian SSR		
USSR		
United Republic of Tanzania		
Upper Volta		
Venezuela		
Vietnam		
Yugoslavia		
Zambia		

== See also ==
- National Question
