= United Nations General Assembly Resolution 40/50 =

UN General Assembly Resolution 40/50
- Date: 2 December 1985
- Code: A/RES/40/50 (Document)
- Subject: Question of Western Sahara
- Voting summary: 96 voted for; 7 voted against; 39 abstained
- Result: Adopted

United Nations General Assembly Resolution 40/50, entitled Question of Western Sahara, is a resolution of the United Nations General Assembly about the situation in Western Sahara, which was adopted on 2 December 1985 at the 40th session of the General Assembly.

== Draft Resolution ==
On 2 December 1985, the United Nations General Assembly adopted resolution A/RES/40/50 by a recorded vote of 96 in favour to 7 against, with 39 abstentions and 17 countries not voting. The table below shows voting results by country:

For	Against	Abstentions
Democratic Republic of Afghanistan	Central African Republic	Belgium
People's Socialist Republic of Albania	Equatorial Guinea	Brunei Darussalam
Algeria	Gabon	Myanmar
Angola	Guatemala	Canada
Antigua & Barbuda	Morocco	Chad
Argentina	Philippines	Chile
Australia	Zaire	Denmark
Austria		El Salvador
Bahamas		France
Barbados		Federal Republic of Germany
Belize		Iceland
People's Republic of Benin		Indonesia
Bhutan		Iraq
Bolivia		Ireland
Botswana		Israel
Brazil		Italy
Bulgaria		Côte d'Ivoire
Burkina Faso		Japan
Burundi		Jordan
Belarus		Luxembourg
Cameroon		Malaysia
Cape Verde		Maldives
Colombia		Norway
Congo		Pakistan
Costa Rica		Paraguay
Cuba		Portugal
Cyprus		Samoa
Czechoslovakia		Saudi Arabia
People's Democratic Republic of Yemen		Singapore
Dominican Republic		Solomon Islands
Ecuador		Somali Democratic Republic
Egypt		Sri Lanka
Ethiopia		Thailand
Fiji		Turkey
Finland		United Kingdom
Gambia		United States
German Democratic Republic		
Ghana		
Greece		
Grenada		
Guinea-Bissau		
Guyana		
Haiti		
Honduras		
Hungary		
India		
Islamic Republic of Iran		
Jamaica		
Kenya		
Lao People's Democratic Republic		
Lesotho		
Liberia		
Madagascar		
Malawi		
Mali		
Malta		
Mauritania		
Mauritius		
Mexico		
Mongolia		
Mozambique		
New Zealand		
Nicaragua		
Niger		
Nigeria		
Panama		
Papua New Guinea		
Peru		
Polish People's Republic		
Rwanda		
Saint Lucia		
Saint Vincent and the Grenadines		
São Tomé and Príncipe		
Senegal		
Seychelles		
Sierra Leone		
Spain		
Sudan		
Suriname		
Swaziland		
Sweden		
Syrian Arab Republic		
Togo		
Trinidad and Tobago		
Tunisia		
Uganda		
Ukrainian Soviet Socialist Republic		
USSR		
United Republic of Tanzania		
Uruguay		
Vanuatu		
Venezuela		
Vietnam		
Yugoslavia		
Zambia		
Zimbabwe		

== See also ==
- National Question
