= Palestinian question =

The Palestinian question (also known as the Palestine question) primarily refers to the unresolved issues of Palestinian nationalism amid the Israeli–Palestinian conflict. The expressions may more specifically refer to:

== United Nations ==
- Ad Hoc Committee on the Palestinian Question, 1947
- United Nations Information System on the Question of Palestine, online resource for UN decisions regarding Palestine
- International Conference for the Peaceful Settlement of the Question of Palestine and the Implementation of the Two-State Solution, 2025

== Writings ==
- Blaming the Victims: Spurious Scholarship and the Palestinian Question, 1988 essay collection by Edward Said
- The Question of Palestine, a book by Edward Said, including the essay "Zionism from the Standpoint of Its Victims"
- The Persistence of the Palestinian Question, 2006 book by Joseph Massad
- Justice for Some: Law and the Question of Palestine, 2019 book by Noura Erakat
