= National liberation (Marxism) =

Theme within Marxism

National liberation has been a theme within Marxism, and especially after the influence of anti-imperialism and self-determination of all peoples became prevalent in communist movements, especially in advocating freedom from colonial rule in the Third World. National liberation has been promoted by Marxists out of an international-socialist perspective rather than a bourgeois nationalist perspective.

After the Russian Revolution, revolutionaries declared that all peoples had the right to self-determination. While communism is critical of nationalism, communists claimed that the cause of national liberation was not a matter of chauvinism, but a matter of radical democracy.

== See also ==
- Left-wing nationalism
- Minzu jiefang (民族解放)
- National delimitation in the Soviet Union
- National Question
- Marxism–Leninism
- Socialist patriotism
