= Albanian question =

Post First World War international relations issue

The Albanian question was the issue of preservation of Albanian independence and territorial integrity following the World War I in relation to the Kingdom of Italy and the Kingdom of Serbs, Croats and Slovenes.

In a presidential note published in The New York Times on 4 March 1920, Woodrow Wilson affirmed that "he cannot approve any plan which assigns to Jugo-Slavia in the Northern district of Albania territorial compensation for what she is deprived of elsewhere," thus forestalling the concession of Shkodër (Scutari) to Yugoslavia in exchange for Yugoslav recognition of Italian rights to Fiume. In an internal memorandum dated 9 December 1919, the delegates of America, Britain and France recognised the borders of the Principality of Albania as laid down in 1913. The Yugoslav delegation, in a memo dated 14 January 1920, was in favour of an independent Albania free of foreign influence, but if that should not be feasible the delegates favoured territorial concessions to Yugoslavia in the north. The Allies were already content to recognise an Italian mandate over central Albania and Yugoslav rights of transit through northern Albania, with the attendant right to build and operate railroads on its territory. The Albanian representatives at the Congress of Lushnjë (27–31 January) voted against any Italian mandate, despite the fact that as a solution it was made to counter Italy's designs on Vlorë (Valona).

== See also ==
- Adriatic question
- Montenegrin question
