= Montenegrin question =

Post-WW1 geopolitical issue

The Montenegrin question was the issue of relationship of the Kingdom of Montenegro with the Kingdom of Serbia and subsequently the issue of its status within the Kingdom of Serbs, Croats and Slovenes after the World War I.

After the collapse of Montenegro's army in 1916, the government and the court went into exile in France. The Allied governments gave King Nicholas I of Montenegro an income, but by the end of 1916 the British and the French had become convinced that he was responsible for the surrender of his army and were refusing to countenance an independent Montenegro after the war. Until the war's end the king and his government continued to receive financial support and diplomatic recognition by the Allies—"an inexplicable state of affairs". The Ally with the most interest in Montenegro was Italy, which had trade relations with her and which saw her as a part of the same sphere of influence as Albania. Italian policy favoured the restoration of Nicholas and immediately after the Austro-Hungarian armistice army and navy troops were moved up the Montenegrin coast in order to keep order pending the return of Montenegrin (royal) self-government. The French refused to allow Nicholas to return, and lent their support to the Montenegrin Yugoslavists. The Italians allowed some of Nicholas's supporters to enter Montenegro with them and gave their tacit support to the royalist Christmas Uprising of December 1918 against the Yugoslavists.

At Paris, Baron Sonnino defended Montenegrin independence, argued for her presence at the negotiating table and attacked irregularities in the election of members for the Podgorica Assembly. Queen Elena of Italy, a daughter of the king of Montenegro, even interceded with Woodrow Wilson on her father's behalf. Although the king was prepared to accept an autonomous Montenegro in a federal Yugoslavia, the Allies believed that any autonomy given to that state would only furnish grounds for continuing Italian intervention. On 7 July 1919, head of the Italian delegation Tittoni approached Major Johnson, the American geographical expert at Paris, with a proposal: in exchange for sovereignty over the Montenegrin Bay of Kotor (Boka Kotorska) and Mount Lovćen Italy would cede all her rights in northern Dalmatia and certain islands. He also conveyed his preference for continued Montenegrin independence, which Johnson (and the British delegate Sir Eyre Crowe) considered a regional danger, and asked Johnson to forward his proposals to the Yugoslav Foreign Minister, Ante Trumbić. After getting Secretary Lansing's approval the next day (8 July), Johnson informed a surprised Trumbić. That same evening the Yugoslav delegation unanimously rejected Italy's "big shot" proposal. After this rebuff, the Italians began negotiating directly with the Yugoslavs through their delegates in the Allied Shipping Commission in London, although the Montenegrin question was mostly avoided. Despite "the preservation of an independent Montenegro" being "among the major postulates of her foreign policy", in Prime Minister Nitti's words, it was felt that in the long term Yugoslav–Montenegrin unification was inevitable and being alone in pressing for her independence would be unseemly in Paris.

By the middle of 1919 the Bay of Kotor, as well as the towns of Bar (Antivari), Budva (Budua) and Ulcinj (Dulcigno) were occupied by army and navy personnel of Britain, France, Italy and Yugoslavia. Clashes were frequent between the last two. The Italians armed and transported the royalist rebels, and spread propaganda about Serb actions in Montenegro. On 20 July 1919 the Yugoslav army attacked some Montenegrin royalists seeking Italian protection in Kotor and several were killed. The Italian government clamped down on its commander in the Balkans, General Settimio Piacentini. In a secret cable of 29 July Tittoni claimed that the Yugoslavs were willing to recognise an Italian protectorate in Albania if Italy would give up any claim in Montenegro.

In debate in the House of Lords on 11 March 1920, Foreign Secretary Lord Curzon affirmed that the Allies did not recognise the legitimacy of the Podgorica Assembly or its deposition of King Nicholas and proclaimed union with Serbia. On 12 February, the Leader of the House of Commons, Bonar Law, urged that "the real point at issue is ... whether what is being done, or what will be done, is in accordance with the wishes of the majority of the Montenegrin people." In April 1919, the Count de Salis, former ambassador to Montenegro (1911–16) at Cetinje, was dispatched there to report on the state of the union with Serbia. The supporters of the Podgorica Assembly argued that Montenegro's adherence to the Allies was nominal at best and that members of the royal family had conspired with the enemy after the defeat of the winter of 1915–16. The supporters of Montenegrin independence argued that the Assembly was a fraud perpetrated by Serbian conquerors, who had endeavoured with French connivance to eliminate Montenegro since its defeat.

== See also ==
- Adriatic question
- Albanian question
