= Distribution of Austro-Hungarian Navy =

The Distribution of Austro-Hungarian Navy to the Allies of World War I took place following the Armistice of Villa Giusti at the end of the World War One. It was a process taking place in parallel with the wartime defeat and dissolution of Austria-Hungary and the subsequent Allied occupation of the eastern Adriatic.

On 8 October 1918, in response to the recent opening of the National Council in Zagreb, the Reichsrat, one of the two parliaments of Austria-Hungary, freed 348 of the 379 sailors still in custody after the mutiny of 1–3 February in Kotor (Cattaro). On 22–24 October officers conducted talks with sailors in their native languages on all ships explaining Emperor Charles I's plan to federalise Cisleithania, but it was too late to restore morale or loyalty to the crown. On 26 October the forbidden call to mutiny, Hurra-Rufe, was heard on the SMS Erzherzog Friedrich in Kotor, and two days later on the battleships in Pula. The sailors organised councils but did not openly rebel or riot. On 31 October 1918 the Austro-Hungarian Navy, with all its ships and other craft, supplies, stores and facilities (ports, arsenals, etc.) was handed over to the National Council of Slovenes, Croats and Serbs by Admiral Miklós Horthy, acting under orders received from the emperor the previous day. All non-Yugoslav sailors were furloughed and all officers were given the option to continue in service to the new nation. The emperor's order contained a proviso that in the future all the "nations" of Austria-Hungary should have a right to claim compensation for their share of the value of the fleet. The formal handover at Kotor took place on 1 November, the same day the Italians sank the battleship SMS Viribus Unitis at Pula, whether yet aware it was a Yugoslav ship or not. Admiral William Sims, commander of the United States Navy in Europe, ordered Admiral Bullard to go to Pula aboard the USS Birmingham and escort the former Austro-Hungarian ships that had been taken over by Yugoslavia to Corfu under white flags.

By the end of the day, 1 November, Chief of the Naval Staff Paolo Emilio Thaon di Revel had informed the government that "the entire Austrian fleet or at least a great part of it has pulled down the Austrian flag and raised the Yugoslav. The fleet or a good part of it is already in the hands of the Yugoslav National Committee." This did not affect negotiations at Villa Giusti, and the armistice was signed on behalf of the navy by Prince Johann of Liechtenstein of the Austrian Navy League and Captain Georg Zwierkowski of the Danube Flotilla. The treaty promised the Italians a share of the Austro-Hungarian fleet (although this had in fact ceased to exist some days before):

- two dreadnoughts: SMS Prinz Eugen and SMS Tegetthoff
- one pre-dreadnought: SMS Erzherzog Franz Ferdinand
- three cruisers: SMS Helgoland, SMS Novara and SMS Saida
- the Tátra-class destroyers

Shortly before the armistice came into effect at 3:00 p.m. on 4 November, the Italian navy occupied Vis (Lissa). This was done "to exorcise the old demons of 1866 [i.e., the Austro-Prussian War] and restore the honour of the Italian navy while the war at least technically was still underway." Before the end of the day Fiume, Trieste and Pula had been occupied, and on 5 November Šibenik (Sebenico) followed. The Yugoslavs abandoned all the vessels they could not man to the Italians, and on 7 November the SMS Radetzky sailed out of Pula for the unoccupied port of Bakar (Buccari). On 9 November the Italian flag was raised on all remaining vessels in Pula. That day, cruisers of the British, French and Italian navies sailed into the Bay of Kotor (Bocche di Cattaro) and the last unoccupied Austro-Hungarian port. The sailors there cut up their Austro-Hungarian ensigns—to prevent them from being taken by the Italians as trophies—and distributed them as souvenirs. That same day, at an inter-Allied conference on Corfu, the Italian diplomat Ugo Conz retorted to his British colleagues, "There can be no fleet where there is no state. There can be no Yugoslav fleet as long as such a state has not yet been founded or as long as peace has not been definitively concluded."
