= Eugen Kumičić =

Croatian writer and politician

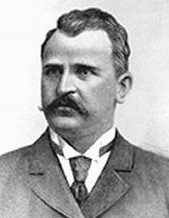
- Born: 11 January 1850; Berschezh, Austrian Empire (now Brseč, Croatia)
- Died: 13 May 1904 (aged 54); Zagreb, Kingdom of Croatia-Slavonia, Austria-Hungary (now Zagreb, Croatia)
- Occupations: Writer, politician, teacher
- Writing career
- Pen name: Jenio Sisolski
- Period: 1879–1902
- Genres: Social novel; Historical novel
- Literary movement: Realism, naturalism

Eugen Kumičić (11 January 1850 – 13 May 1904) was a Croatian writer and politician. Kumičić is one of the most prolific Croatian novelists of the realism era and is considered a pioneer of naturalism in Croatian literature.

== Biography ==
Kumičić was born in Brseč, Mošćenička Draga (now in Primorje-Gorski Kotar County), a small town in Istria, then part of the Austrian Empire.

After majoring philosophy at the University of Vienna, he returned to Croatia and worked as a teacher in high schools in Split and Zadar. From 1875 to 1878 he spent two years in Paris and six months in Venice, preparing for his French and Italian teaching examinations. While in France, he came into contact with naturalist writing, primarily through the works of Émile Zola.

Upon returning to Croatia, he spent the period from 1879 to 1883 teaching French and Italian in a Zagreb high school. During that time, he became actively involved with the Croatian literary scene, as well as political activism. An ardent supporter of Ante Starčević's political program and one of his closest associates, he quit the civil service in 1883 in order to pursue a political and literary career. With Matko Laginja and Erazmo Barčić he launched the Primorac magazine in Kraljevica. He also worked as the editor of the Party of Rights' magazines Hrvatska vila (1882–1883) and Hrvatska (1887–1888), and published essays, opinion pieces and short stories in them. In 1884 he was elected to Croatian Parliament as a member of the Party of Rights. After the party split in 1895, Kumičić sided with the Frankists. He spent most of his political career opposing the Hungarian nationalists.

== Literary work ==
He wrote many novels and short stories, mostly dealing with working-class people in his native Istria. He also tried to introduce elements of naturalism to Croatian literature in his novels dealing with urban life and Croatian history, but his efforts were often hampered by national romantic tendencies. His works were therefore primarily influenced by realist and romanticist writers of the era such as August Šenoa, Alexandre Dumas and Eugène Sue. Nevertheless, as he published an influential and controversial Zolaesque literary essay about the poetics of writing (O romanu, (Eng. On Novel)) in 1883, he was seen by his contemporaries as the pioneer of naturalist writing in Croatian literature. Kumičić's plays were not as successful as his prose, and are described as being of modest artistic value.

His literary work is usually divided into three thematic periods: the first period of his writing is marked by novels and short stories that involve romanticized descriptions of hard working Istrians' life - primarily fishermen, farmers and seamen; the bulk of his next literary phase typically deals with urban settings (the so-called city novels), where his naturalist tendencies are most prominent and which mostly involve themes of financial and moral chaos that Croatian bourgeoisie was depicted as caught up in. His last works were historical novels loosely based on important figures of Croatian history.

== Works ==
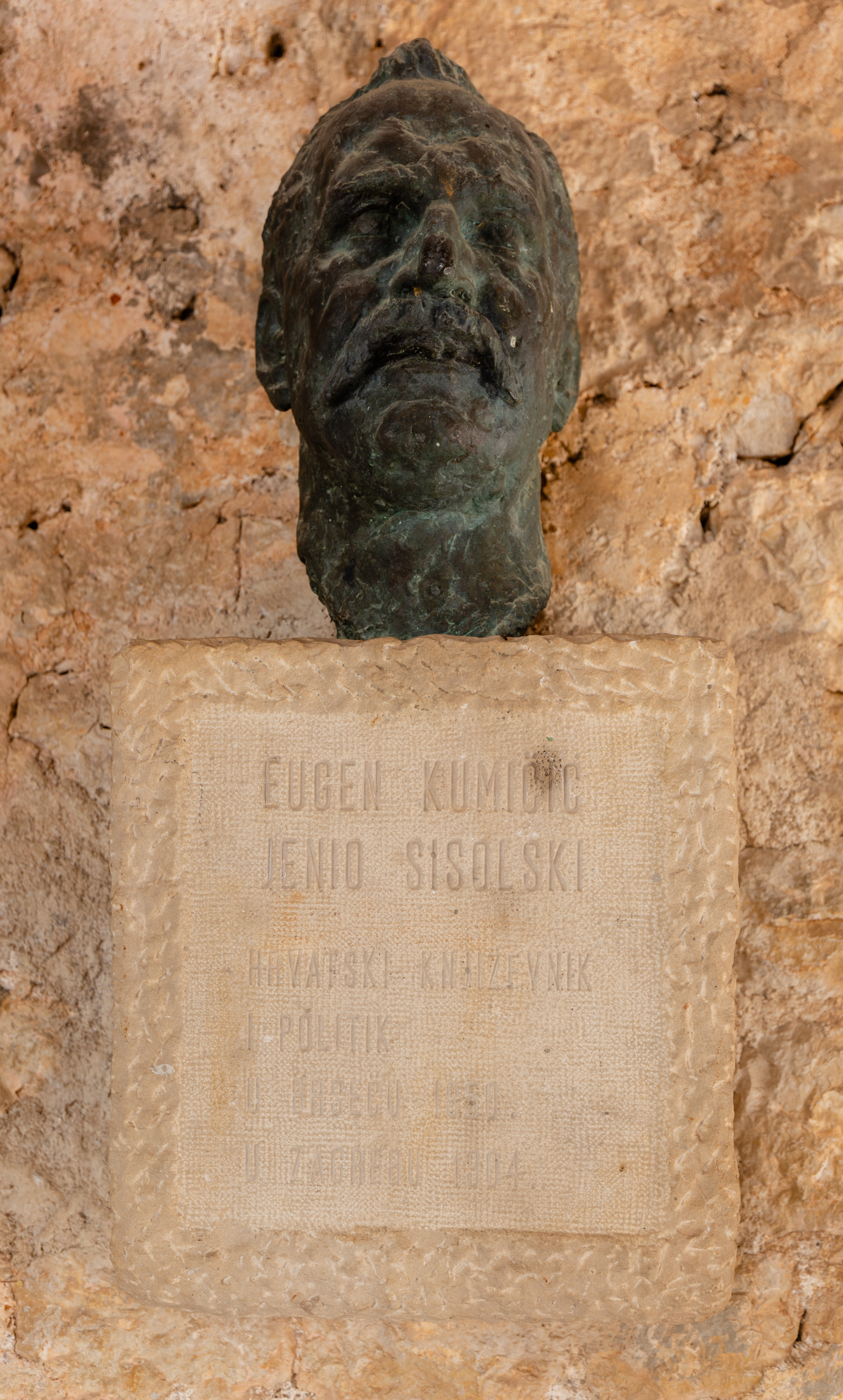
Kumičić's bust in his hometown, Brseč

Novels

- Olga i Lina (1881)
- Primorci (1882)
- Začuđeni svatovi (1883)
- Gospođa Sabina (1883)
- Sirota (1885)
- Teodora (1889)
- Urota Zrinsko-Frankopanska (1893)
- Kraljica Lepa ili propast kraljeva hrvatske krvi (1902)

Short stories

- Slučaj (1879)
- Jelkin bosiljak (1881)
- Neobični ljudi (1882)
- Ubilo ga vino (1884)
- Preko mora (1889)
- Saveznice (1889)
- Otrovana srca (1890)
- Broj 84 i 85 (1890)
- Crn Božić (1890)
- Tri mučenice (1890)
- Mladost-ludost (1891)
- Pobijeljeni grobovi (1896)

Plays

- Sestre (1890)
- Obiteljska tajna (1890)
- Poslovi (1898)
- Petar Zrinski (1900)

Essays and other non-fiction

- O romanu (1883)
- Ivan Turgenjev (1883)
- Pod puškom (1886)
- Zablude naše kritike (1890)
- Petar Zrinski, Fran Krsto Frankopan i njihovi klevetnici (1899)

== Bibliography ==
- Banov-Depope, Estela (2011). "Kumičićev društveno-analitički postupak s motrišta sociologije književnosti". Zvuci i znaci: Interkulturalne i intermedijalne kroatističke studije [Kumičić's Social-Analytic Method from the Standpoint of Sociology and Literature] (in Serbo-Croatian). pp. 135–146. ISBN 978-953-7534-72-1.
