= Brseč =

- Village
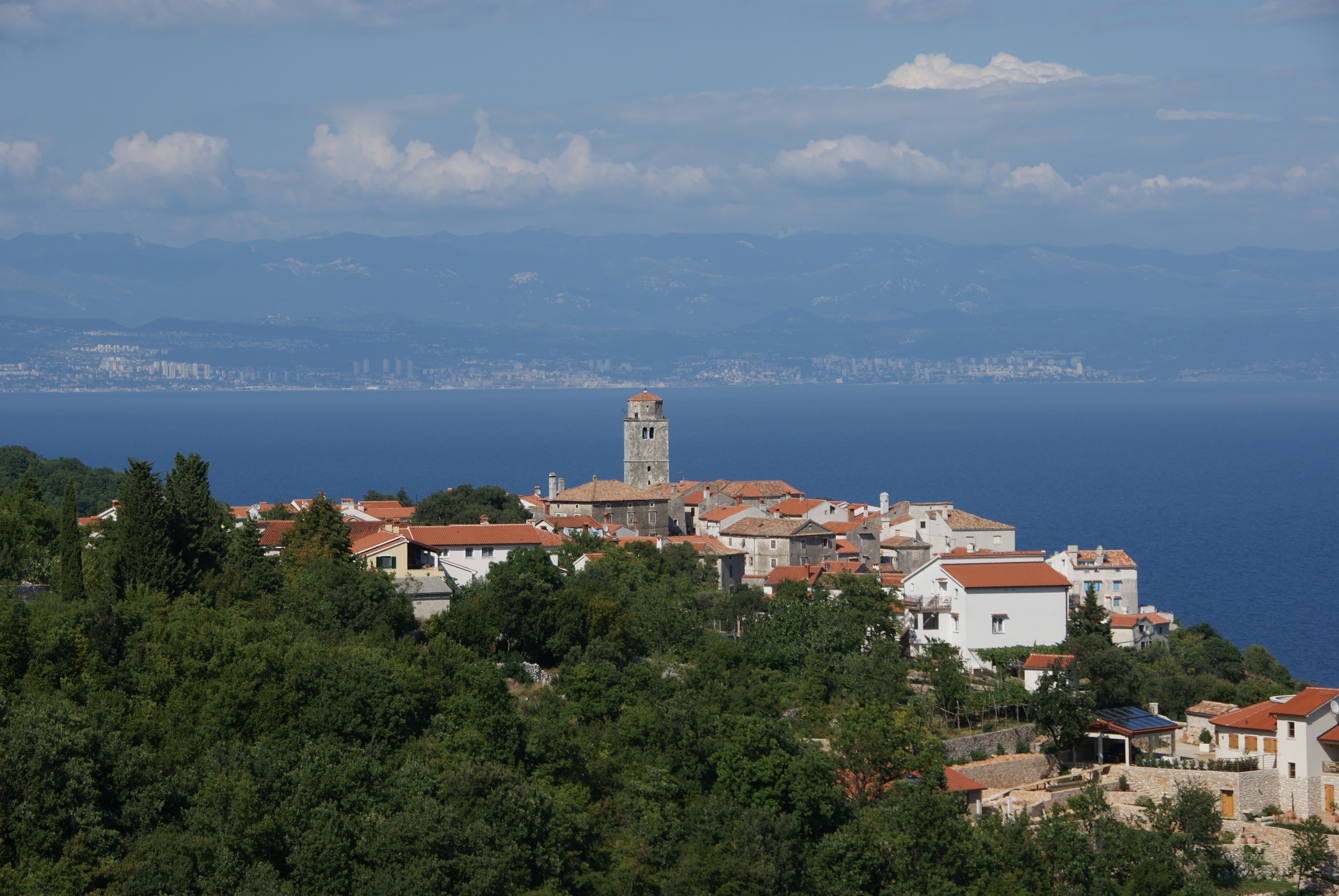
- View over Brseč and Kvarner Gulf

- Location within Croatia
- Coordinates: 45°11′N 14°14′E
- Country: Croatia
- County: Primorje-Gorski Kotar County
- Municipality: Mošćenička Draga

Area
  - Total: 4.9 km^{2} (1.9 sq mi)

Population (2021)
  - Total: 124
  - Density: 25/km^{2} (66/sq mi)
- Time zone: UTC+1 (CET)
  - Summer (DST): UTC+2 (CEST)

Brseč (Italian: Bersezio) is a village in western Croatia. It is part of Mošćenička Draga municipality in Primorje-Gorski Kotar County.

The village is located on the steep, eastern shore of the Istrian peninsula, on cliffs high above the Kvarner Gulf, about 20 kilometres (12 mi) south of Opatija. It is connected to Rijeka and Pula by the D66 highway.

Most of the town houses in Brseč were built in the 17th century, while the walls, fortifications and church belfry were built in the early Middle Ages. Kaštel, the old core around which the settlement later developed, also dates from the Middle Ages.

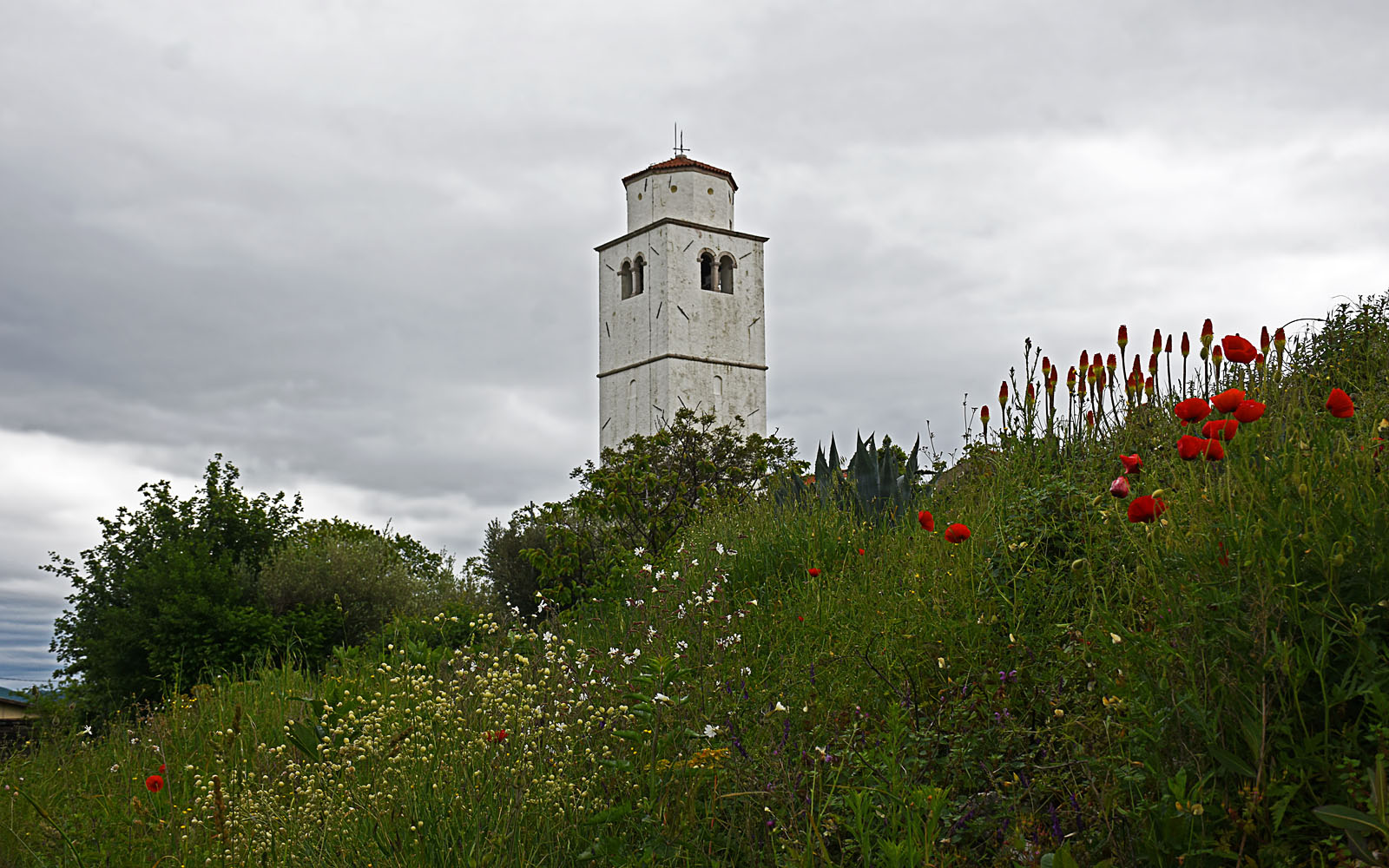
St. George

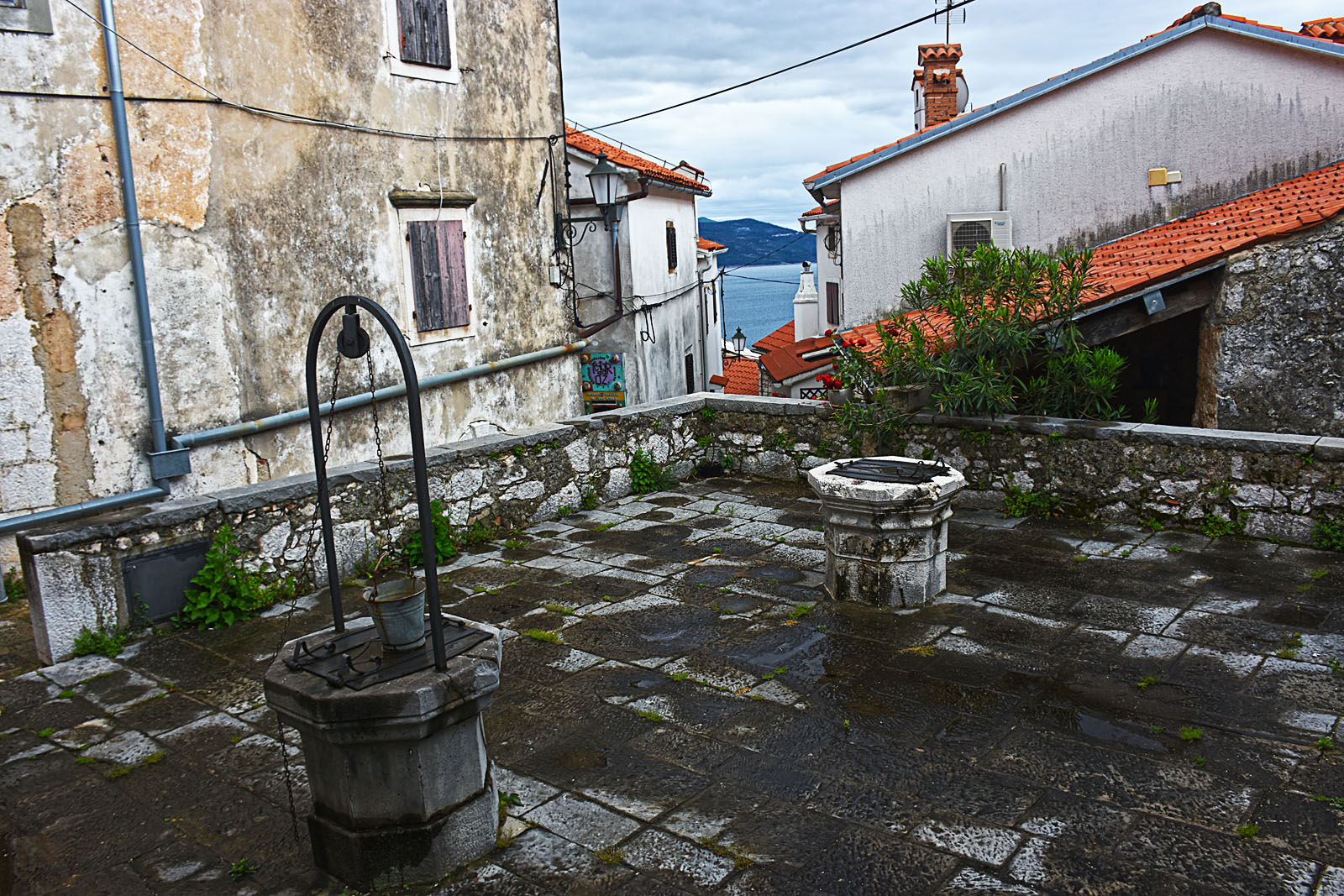
Village tank

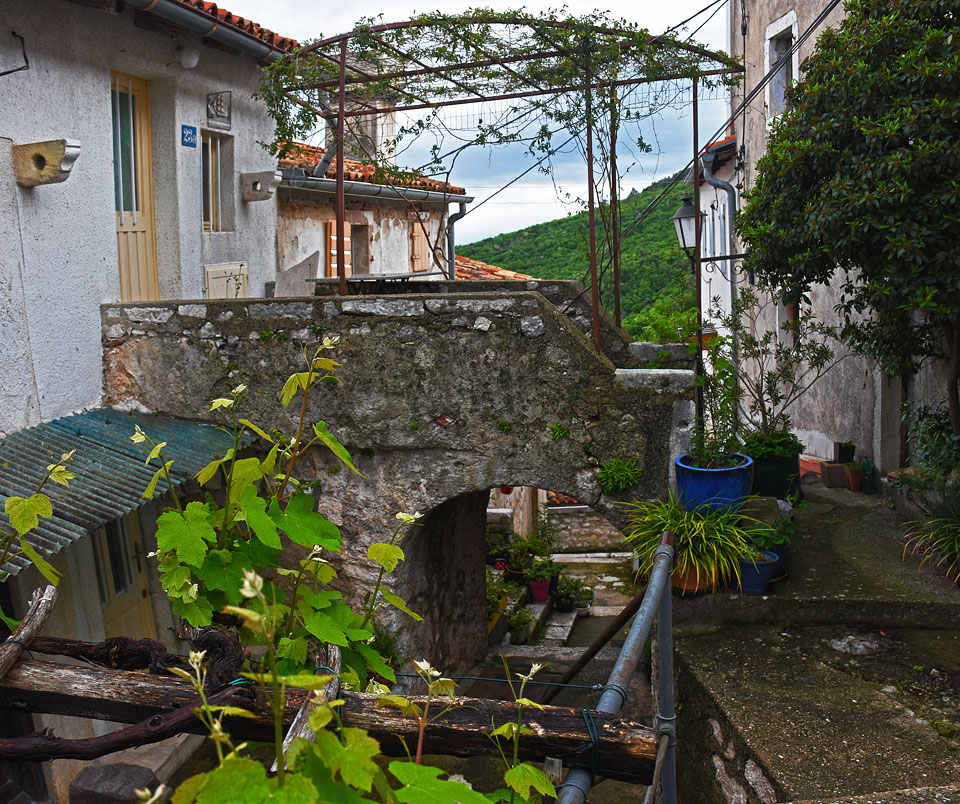
Street in Brseč

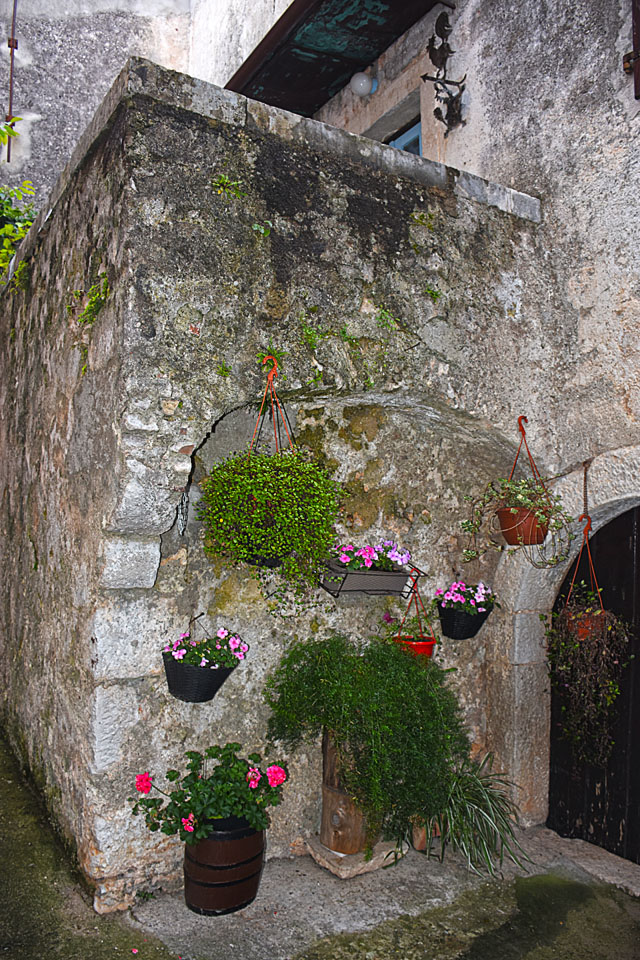
Street detail

== Notable people ==
- Eugen Kumičić (1850–1904), writer.

== Monuments and sights ==
=== Art installation "Strokes and Incisions" ===
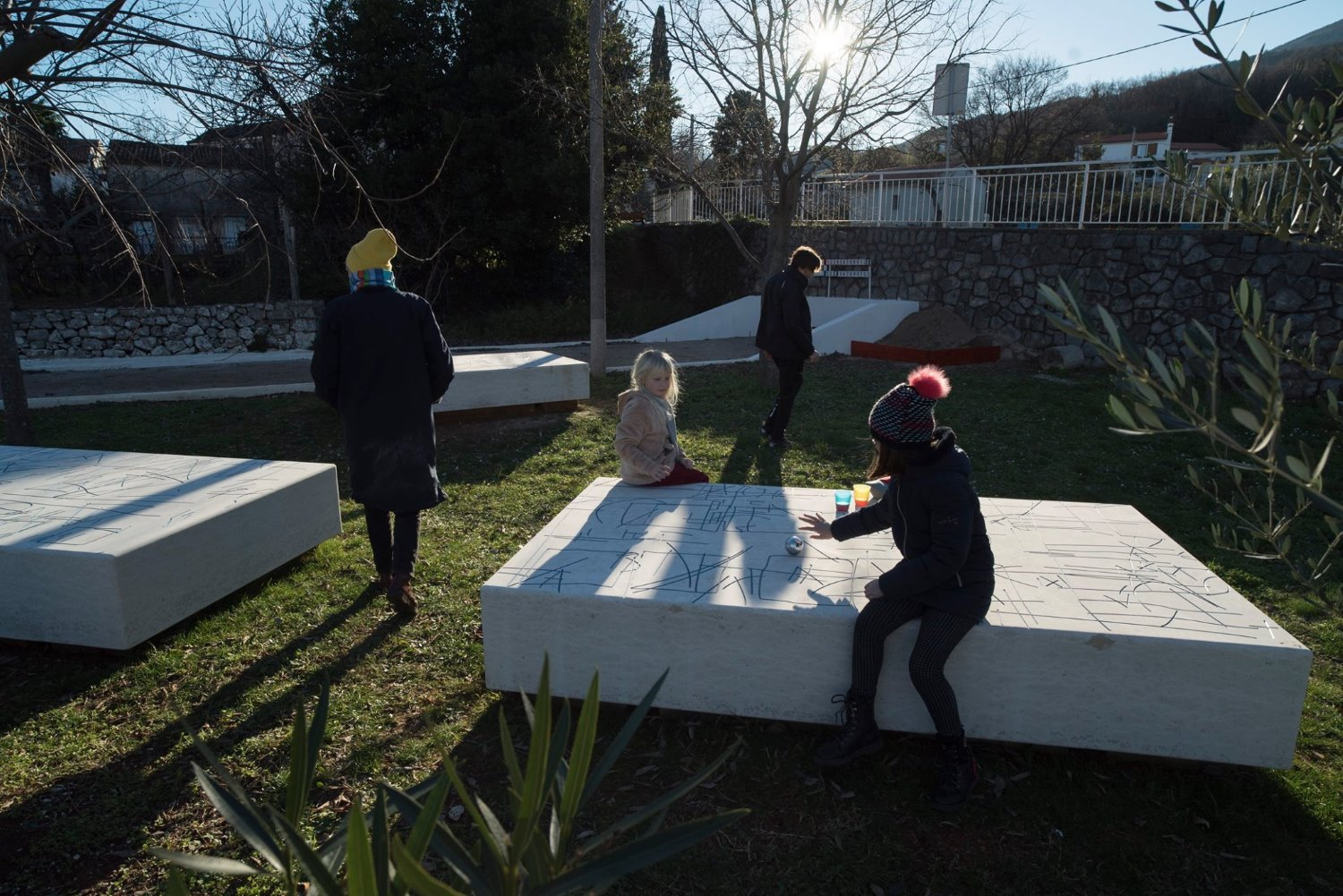
Art installation "Strokes and Incisions"

"Strokes and Incisions", a site-specific art installation authored by Danish-Austrian artist Sofie Thorsen can be found in the small park next to the bocce court at the very entrance to Brseč. Thorsen was inspired by a primary school in Brseč closing after more than one hundred and seventy-five years of continuous work. The installation consists of three stone objects whose shapes and colors symbolize paper, and the incised lines represent a fountain pen. The engraved forms were created on the basis of three pre-existing inscriptions: scribbles from old student notebooks from the closed school, graffiti from a street in Brseč and fragments of manuscripts by Eugen Kumičić.

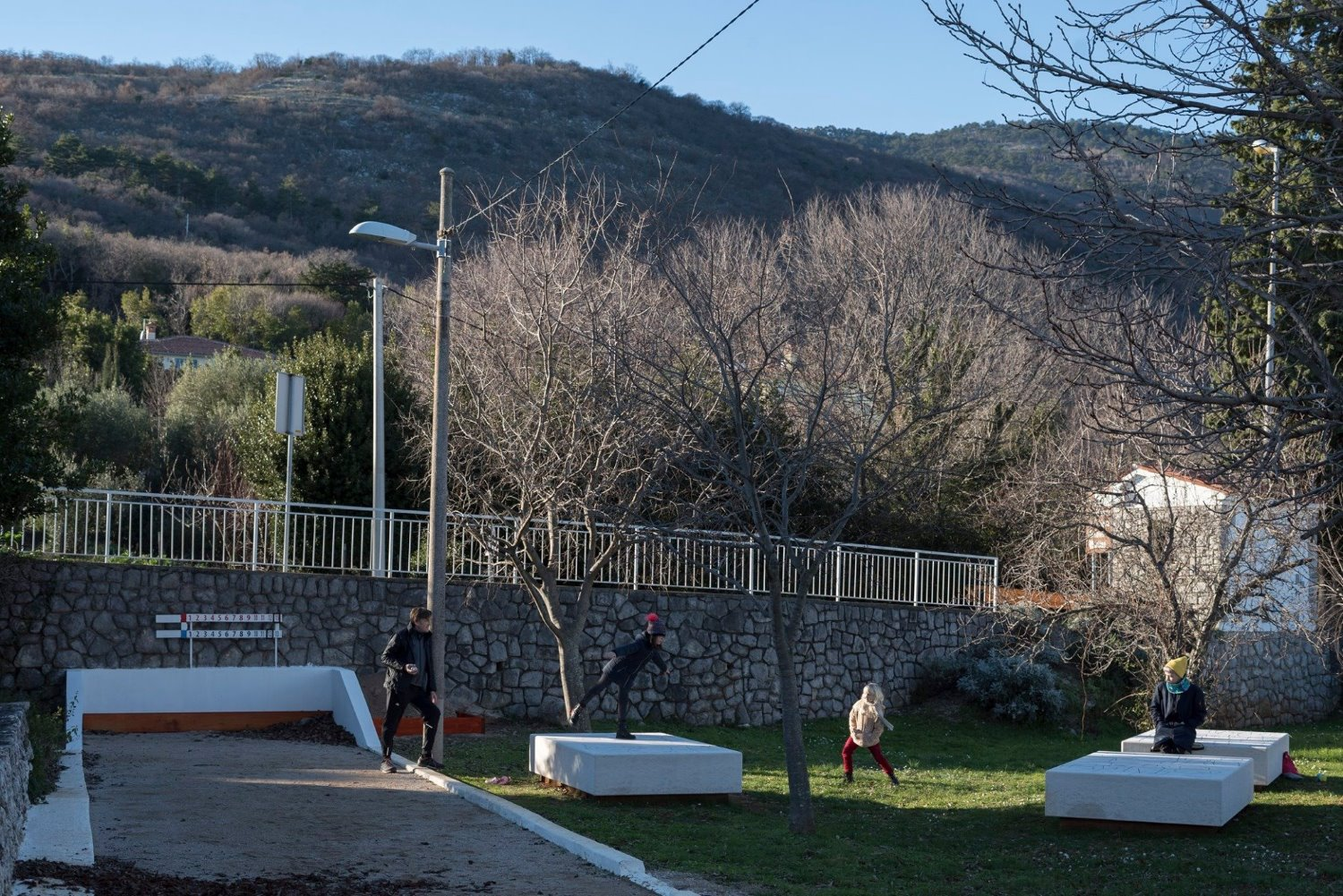
Renovated bocce court next to the art installation

As part of the project, the aforementioned Brseč bocce court was renovated.

== Bibliography ==
- Šašić, Martina; Nahirnić, Ana; Tarmann, Gerhard M. (2016-12-31). "Zygaenidae (Lepidoptera) in the Lepidoptera collections of the Croatian Natural History Museum". Natura Croatica: Periodicum Musei Historiae Naturalis Croatici. 25 (2): 233–248. doi:10.20302/NC.2016.25.19. eISSN 1848-7386.
