= Mošćenice =

Village in Mošćenička Draga, Croatia

- Location within Croatia
- Coordinates: 45°13′N 14°15′E
- Country: Croatia
- County: Primorje-Gorski Kotar
- Municipality: Mošćenička Draga

Area
  - Total: 2.6 km^{2} (1.0 sq mi)

Population (2021)
  - Total: 279
  - Density: 110/km^{2} (280/sq mi)
- Time zone: UTC+1 (CET)
  - Summer (DST): UTC+2 (CEST)

Mošćenice (also called Župa Mošćenice) is a village in the municipality of Mošćenička Draga in Primorje-Gorski Kotar County on the Istrian peninsula, close to Opatija, Croatia.

It is a typical hilltop village with stone houses and narrow streets situated 173 metres above Mošćenička Draga. From Mošćenice one has a nice view across the Kvarner Gulf to Rijeka and the islands of Krk and Cres. The village is connected to the Mošćenička Draga by road and 750 steps which lead from Sv. Ivan beach to the centre of the village. Besides the old St. Andrew church, places of interest are the local ethnographic museum and an old olive extraction mill.

The town is typically built as a concentrically conceived settlement with outer walls consisting of houses whose outside walls function as walls of the fortress. In such an enclosed environment, space is precious and all houses are built close to one another, separated by narrow streets and sometimes linked by covered passages. Much of the medieval structure is still visible now.

== History ==
Its history dates back to the prehistory when Liburnians settled here. They were cattle breeders and seamen, known for their fast rowing boats. Istria was conquered by the Romans after two military campaigns in 177 BC, calling the region Liburnia, part of the province of Dalmatia. With the end of the 6th century, Croats arrived and built their first permanent settlement in Liburnia around the year 620. Istria was annexed by the Franks during the reign of Pepin the Short in 789, But Liburnia became part of the State of Croatia. When this state fell, Liburnia and thus also Mošćenice became part of the Holy Roman Empire.

The village was for the first time mentioned as an independent community with its own statute in 1374 in the testament of Count Ugona of Duina, written in German. Mošćenice was mentioned again, this time in Glagolitic-script, in document delineating boundaries between Moscenice and Kosljak.

Mošćenice was ruled by Polish bishops, the Counts of Duina and then the Counts of Walse. Mošćenice came under the Holy Roman Emperor Frederick III when the Counts of Walse transferred their estate to him.

In 1637 Mošćenice was awarded its own City Statute. In the same year, the city was transferred into the possession of the Jesuits of Rijeka. This ended in 1773.

During a short period 1801 -1813, by the Treaty of Schönbrunn, Mošćenice was part of the Napoleonic Illyrian Provinces and therefore nominally part of the French Empire. When the French troops were chased away by the Austrian troops in 1813, Mošćenice became part of the Austrian Empire until the end of the first World War. In 1896, Mošćenice became an independent municipality as part of the Austrian province.

== St. Andrew's church ==
There was already a small church in the 8th century, during the period of the Croatian Christianization. A new church was built between 1200-1300. The only remaining parts are the Romanesque-Longobardic church tower and, inside the church, the wall under the choir with four columns. The parish was founded at the beginning of the 14th century. All ritual books ware written in Glagolitic. Only in the second half of the 19th century, the liturgy was written in Croatian.

The church consists of a central nave, heightened in 1640, and two lateral aisles with lower ceilings, added between 1785 and 1795. The central altar dates from the 18th century. Its five marble statues were sculpted by the Paduan artist Jacopo Contieri. They represent (on the left) Saint Ignatius of Loyola, founder of the Jesuit order, (on the right) the Bohemian saint John of Nepomuk and (on top) two angels and the risen Christ. The painting behind the altar represents the apostle Saint Andrew on the X-shaped cross. The walnut canonical choirs were added between 1620 and 1705. The frescoes above the choir were added by the Italian soldier Carmine Visintini in 1942 (during World War II).

The two side altars are dedicated to Our Lady of the Rosary (with statues of Saint Dominic and St. Catherine of Siena) and to St. Francis. The pulpit dates from 1791 and the Baroque baptismal font was added in the early 18th century. Below the choir is an old statue of St. Peter, dating from the 17th century. it was transferred to the church from a private house. The present organ dates from 1847, replacing an older organ from 1658, and was restored between 1997 and 1998.

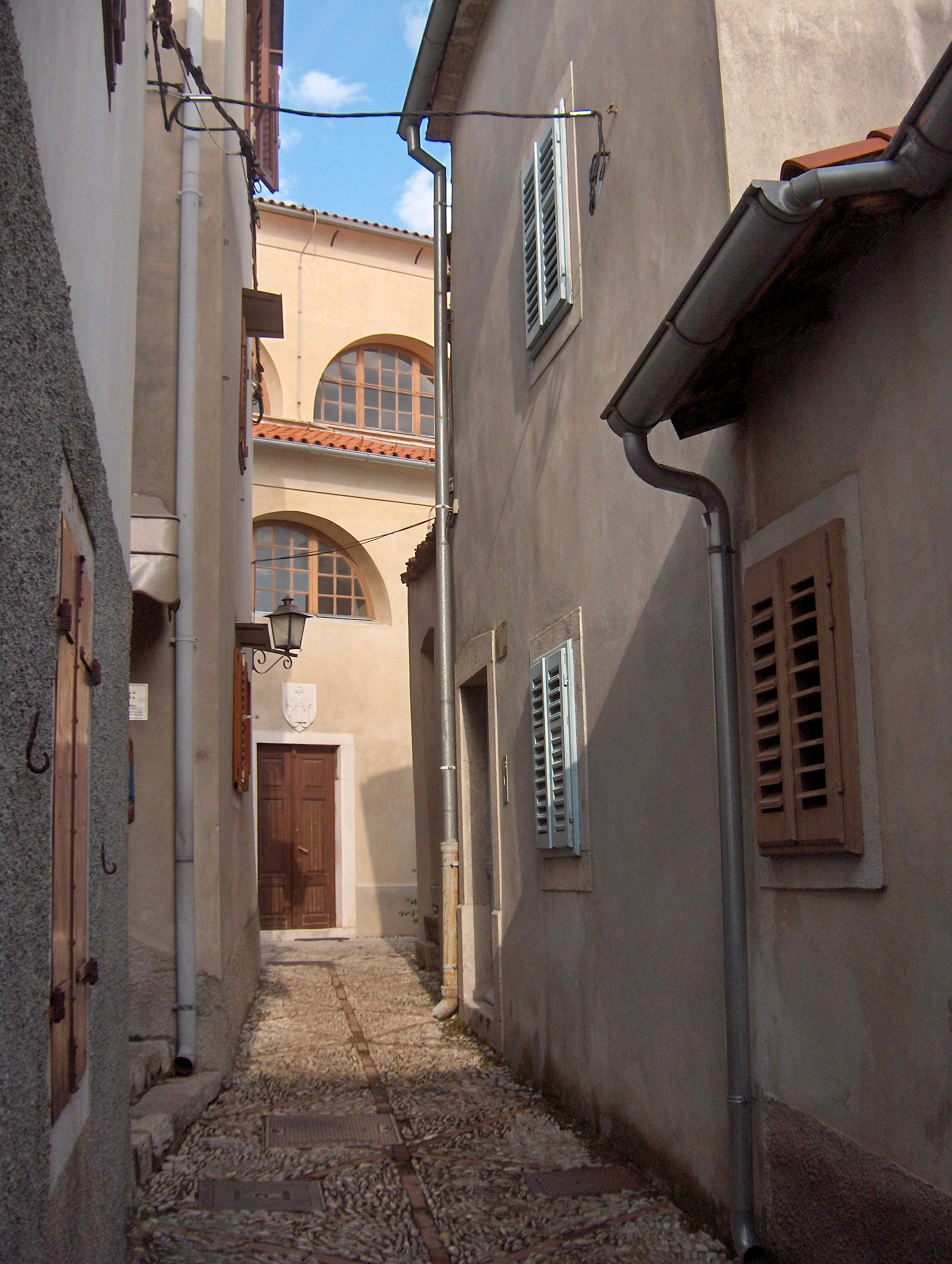
Narrow streets

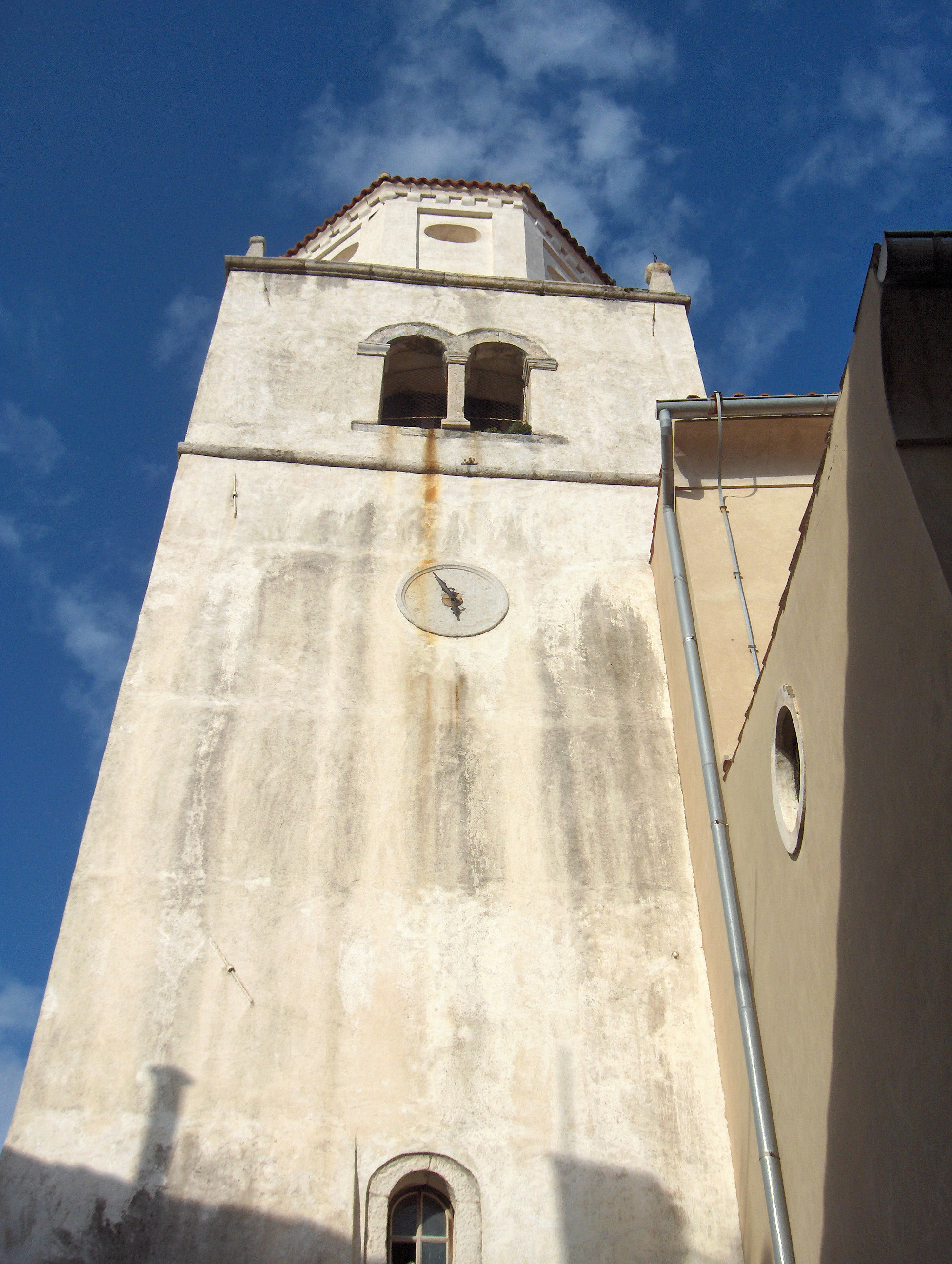
Romanesque-Longobardic tower of St. Andrew's church

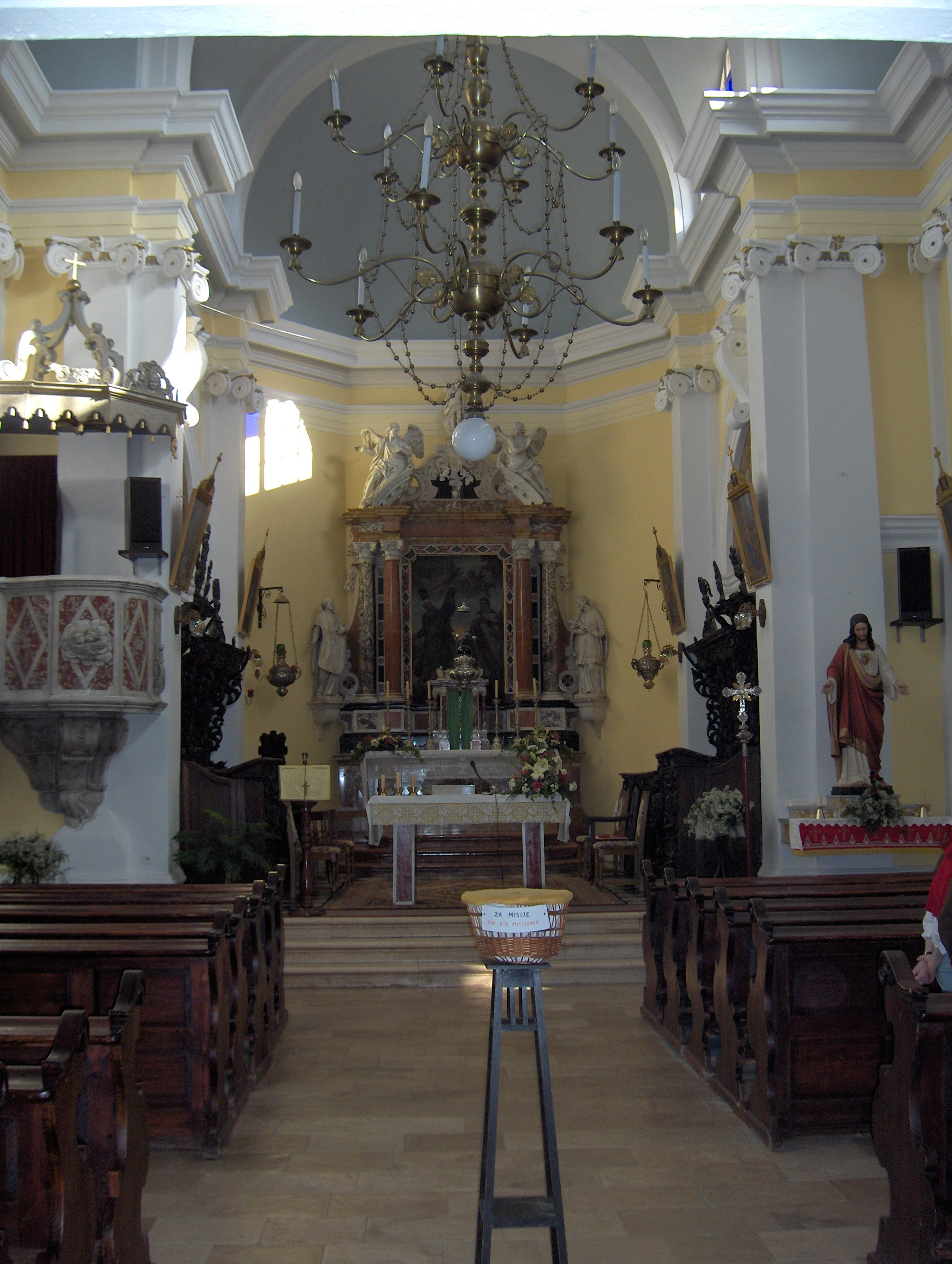
Central nave

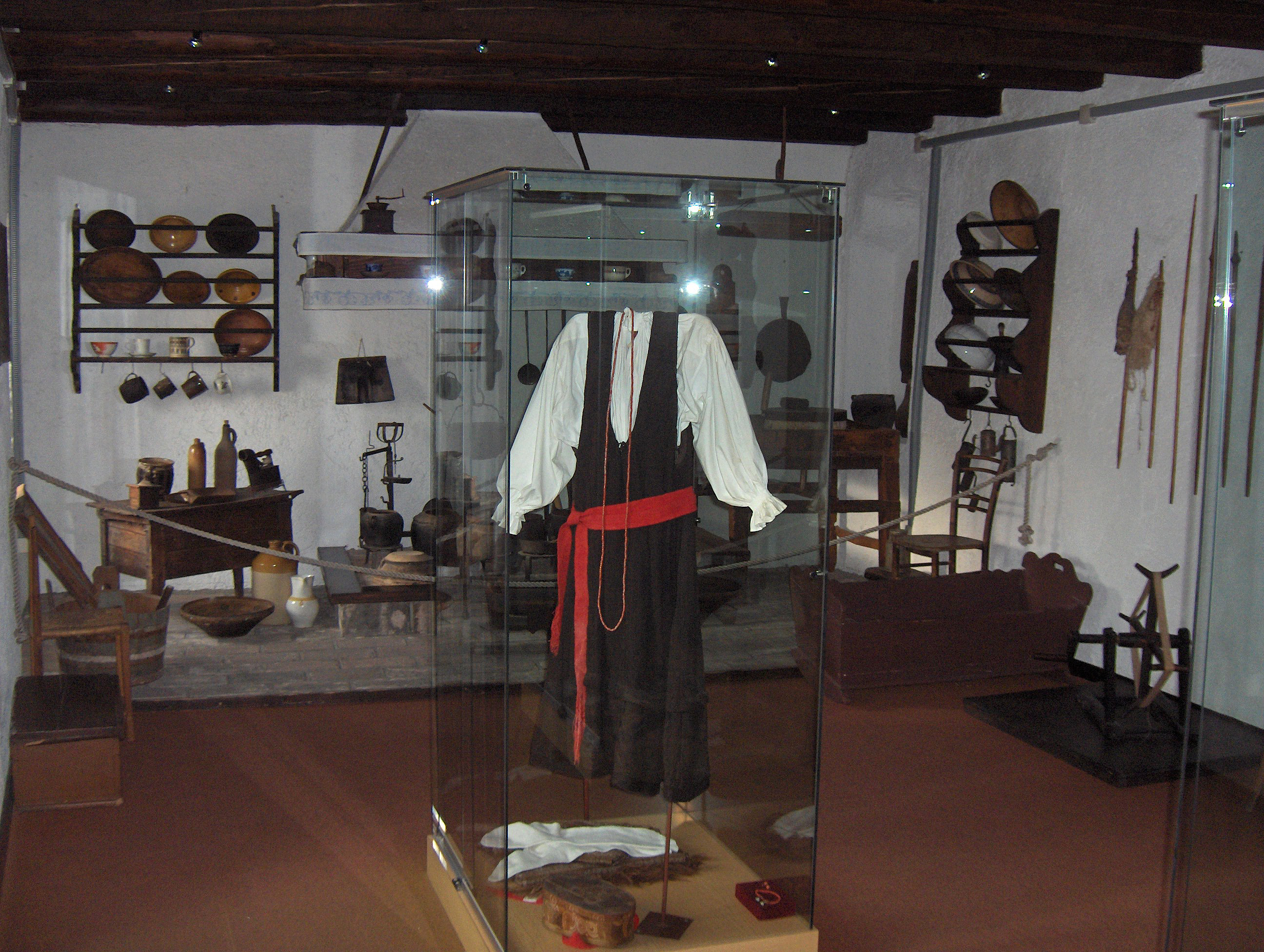
Ethnographic museum

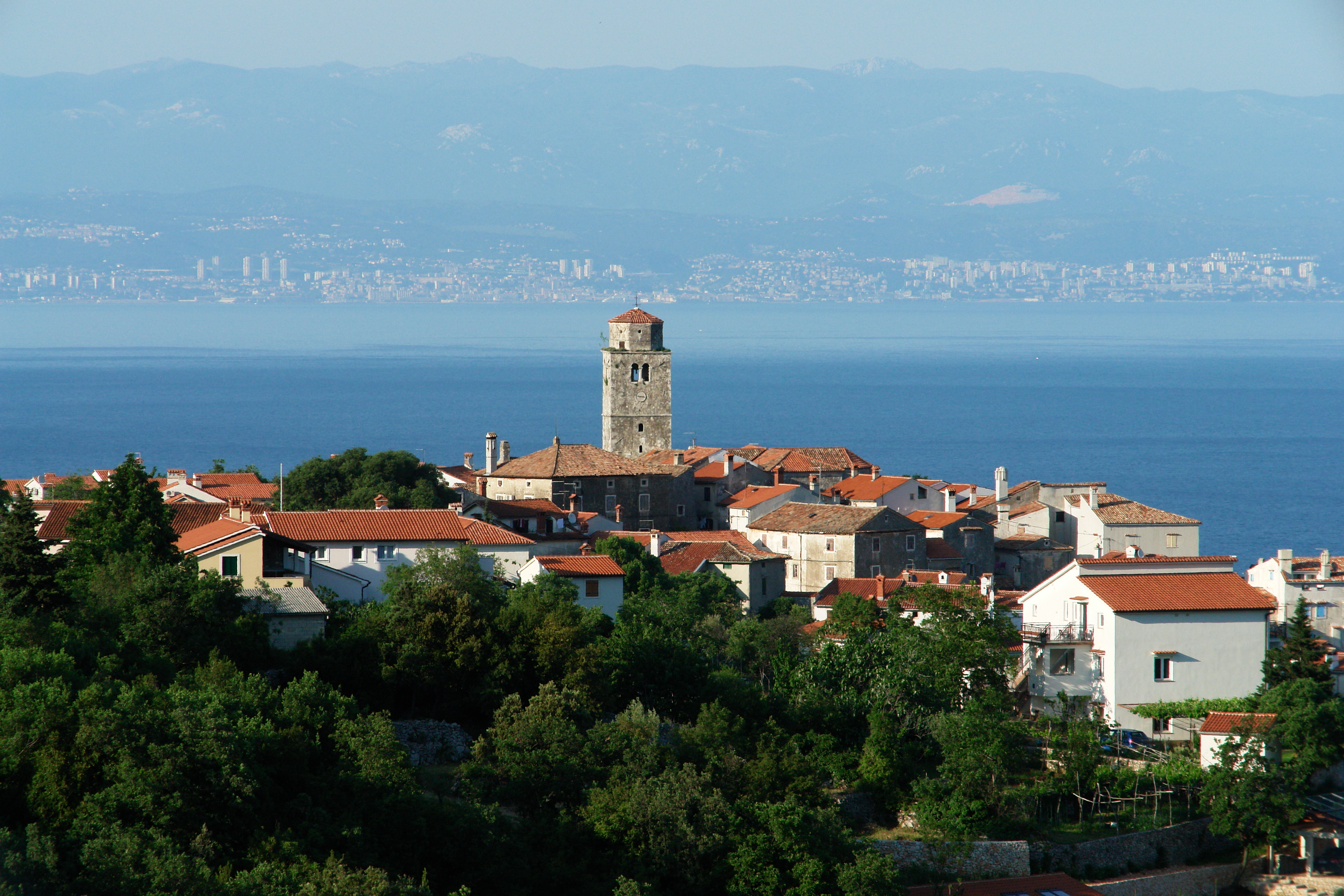
Mošćenice
