= Mošćenička Draga =

- Municipality
- Mošćenička Draga Municipality; Općina Mošćenička Draga
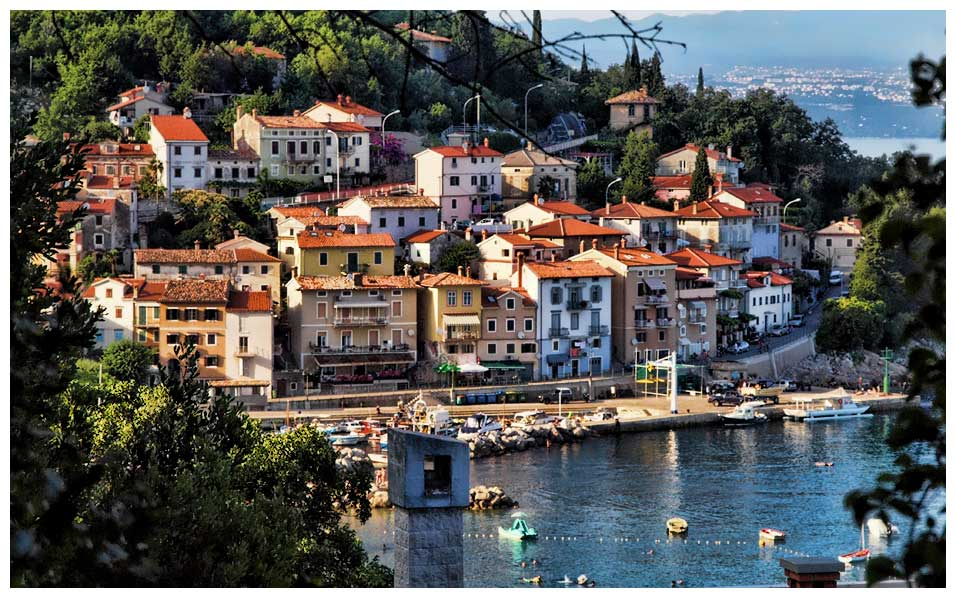
- Mošćenička Draga

- Flag

- Location within Croatia
- Coordinates: 45°14′N 14°15′E
- Country: Croatia
- County: Primorje-Gorski Kotar County

Government
  - Mayor: Rikardo Staraj (PGS)
  - City Council: 11 members: PGS-SDP-IDS-HSU (5); _; HDZ (3); _; HSS (3)

Area
  - Municipality: 46.7 km^{2} (18.0 sq mi)
  - Urban: 1.5 km^{2} (0.58 sq mi)

Population (2021)
  - Municipality: 1,288
  - Density: 27.6/km^{2} (71.4/sq mi)
  - Urban: 452
  - Urban density: 300/km^{2} (780/sq mi)
- Time zone: UTC+1 (CET)
  - Summer (DST): UTC+2 (CEST)
- Area code: 051
- Website: moscenicka-draga.hr

Mošćenička Draga (Italian: Draga di Moschiena) is a municipality in Primorje-Gorski Kotar County, Croatia. It is situated southwest of Opatija under Mt. Učka. The settlement of Mošćenička Draga developed as a fishing port of the town of Mošćenice, and was first mentioned in 1436.

The centre of the municipality is the former fishing village of Mošćenička Draga which is today a tourist resort with two beaches, small marina and walking paths. Above Mošćenička Draga there is the hilltop town of Mošćenice.

== Population ==
In the 2011 census, it had a total of 1,535 inhabitants, 90.7% of which were Croats. The municipality consisted of the following settlements:

- Brseč, population 129
- Golovik, population 84
- Grabrova, population 10
- Kalac, population 32
- Kraj, population 98
- Mala Učka, no population
- Martina, population 50
- Mošćenice, population 301
- Mošćenička Draga, population 585
- Obrš, population 14
- Sučići, population 45
- Sveta Jelena, population 93
- Sveti Anton, population 8
- Zagore, population 86

== Gallery ==
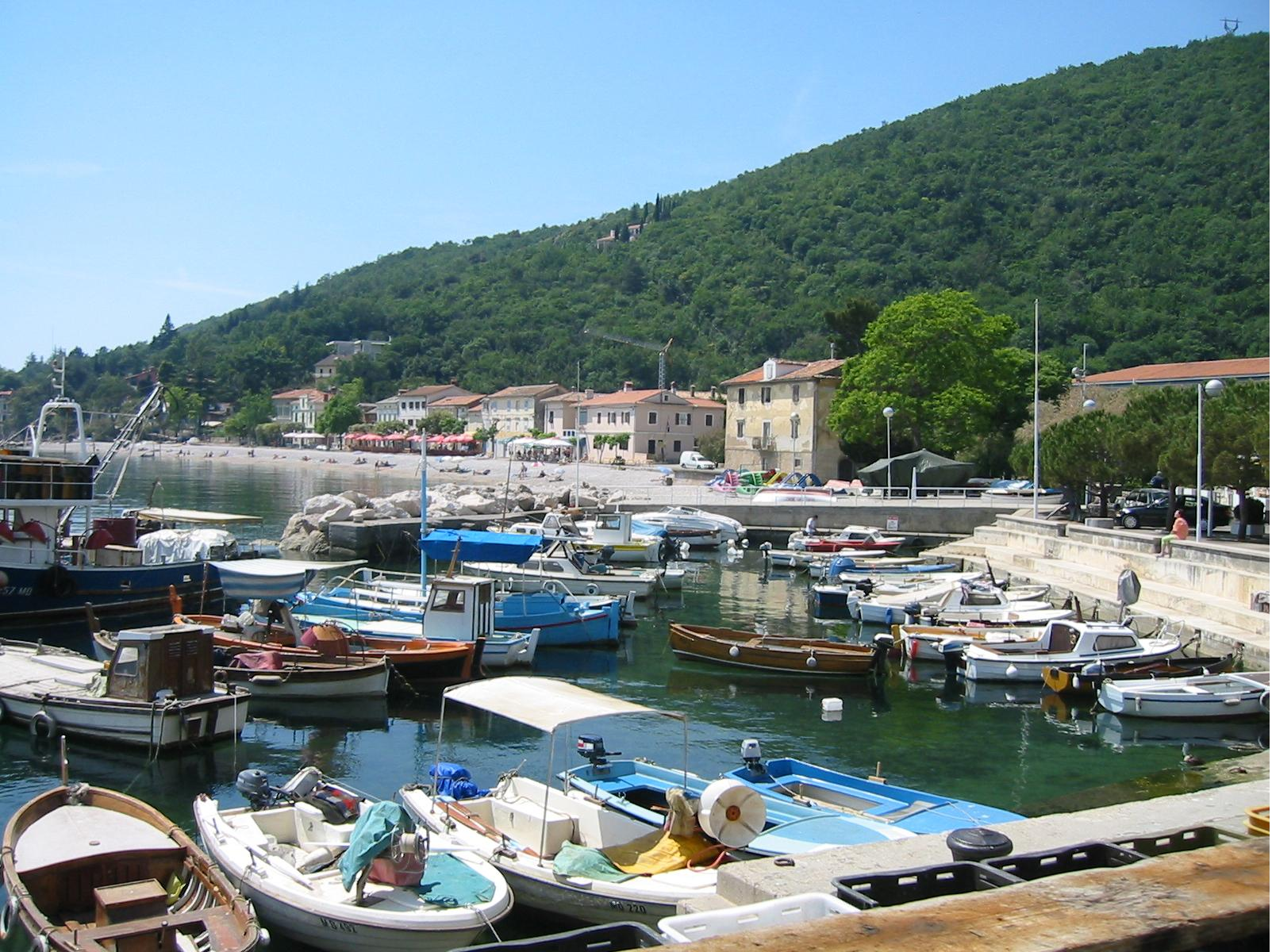
Port

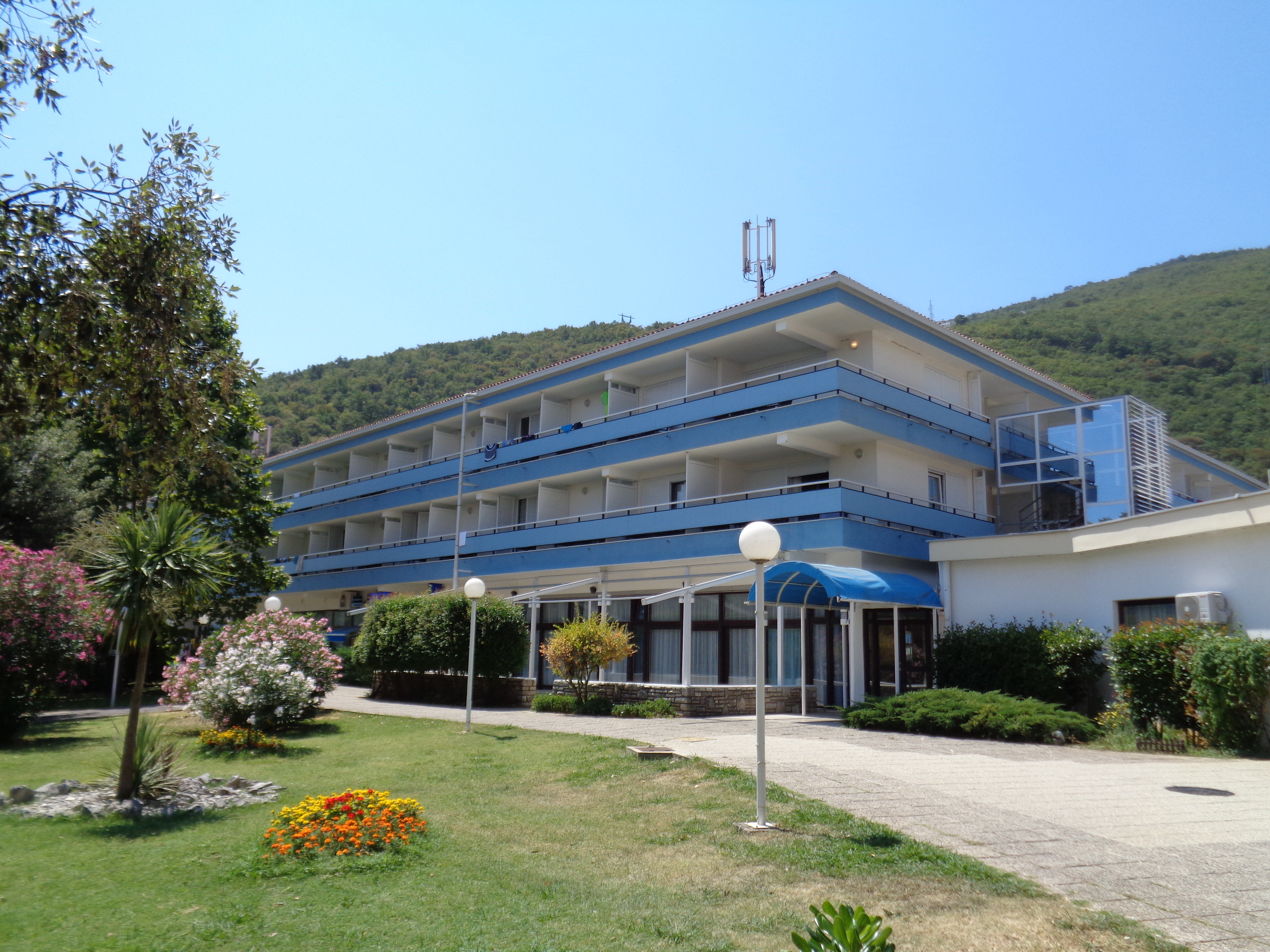
"Marina" Hotel

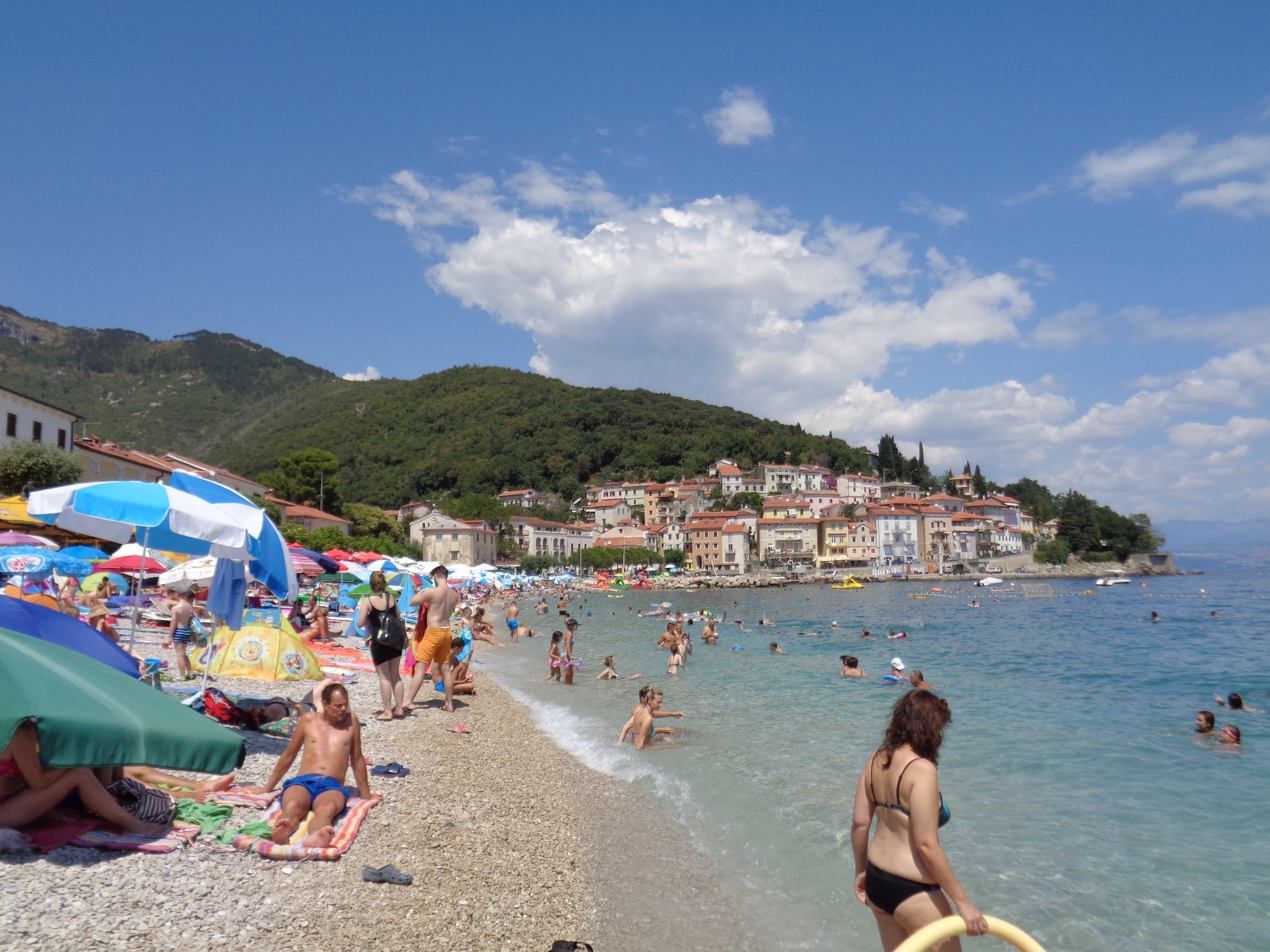
Beach

== Bibliography ==
=== Biology ===
- Šašić, Martina; Nahirnić, Ana; Tarmann, Gerhard M. (2016-12-31). "Zygaenidae (Lepidoptera) in the Lepidoptera collections of the Croatian Natural History Museum". Natura Croatica: Periodicum Musei Historiae Naturalis Croatici. 25 (2): 233–248. doi:10.20302/NC.2016.25.19. eISSN 1848-7386.

Climate data for Mošćenička Draga (Mošćenička Draga 2015–2020, sunshine 2015–2020, extremes 1949–present)
Month	Jan	Feb	Mar	Apr	May	Jun	Jul	Aug	Sep	Oct	Nov	Dec	Year
Record high °C (°F)	20.8 (69.4)	22.9 (73.2)	26.7 (80.1)	29.4 (84.9)	34.2 (93.6)	35.6 (96.1)	39.3 (102.7)	40.2 (104.4)	34.9 (94.8)	27.8 (82.0)	24.2 (75.6)	21.7 (71.1)	40.2 (104.4)
Mean daily maximum °C (°F)	11.7 (53.1)	14.9 (58.8)	16.6 (61.9)	18.7 (65.7)	21.3 (70.3)	25.0 (77.0)	29.8 (85.6)	30.5 (86.9)	26.3 (79.3)	20.2 (68.4)	16.2 (61.2)	12.9 (55.2)	20.3 (68.6)
Daily mean °C (°F)	8.8 (47.8)	13.0 (55.4)	16.2 (61.2)	19.6 (67.3)	21.5 (70.7)	22.3 (72.1)	22.7 (72.9)	22.0 (71.6)	17.1 (62.8)	11.4 (52.5)	10.7 (51.3)	9.6 (49.3)	16.2 (61.2)
Mean daily minimum °C (°F)	4.0 (39.2)	3.8 (38.8)	4.9 (40.8)	7.6 (45.7)	11.8 (53.2)	15.8 (60.4)	19.8 (67.6)	20.4 (68.7)	16.0 (60.8)	13.6 (56.5)	9.1 (48.4)	5.3 (41.5)	6.6 (43.9)
Record low °C (°F)	−10.6 (12.9)	−9.6 (14.7)	−6.9 (19.6)	−1.2 (29.8)	2.4 (36.3)	7.2 (45.0)	8.3 (46.9)	6.5 (43.7)	4.6 (40.3)	−1.9 (28.6)	−4.4 (24.1)	−9.9 (14.2)	−10.6 (12.9)
Average precipitation mm (inches)	158.5 (6.24)	254.9 (10.04)	175.7 (6.92)	87.9 (3.46)	90.2 (3.55)	45.3 (1.78)	24.5 (0.96)	37.4 (1.47)	70.4 (2.77)	119.0 (4.69)	289.2 (11.39)	276.9 (10.90)	1,629.9 (64.17)
Average rainy days (≥ 0.2 mm)	19.7	18.9	16.9	14.5	9.2	6.9	3.8	6.4	11.3	15.9	19.9	18.5	161.9
Mean monthly sunshine hours	77.2	93.4	150.0	184.1	248.2	296.7	327.2	286.8	180.3	86.7	68.1	70.2	2,068.9
Source 1: Weatheronline.de
Source 2: Meteociel.fr
