= Giorgio Pisanò =

Italian neo-fascist politician (1924–1997)

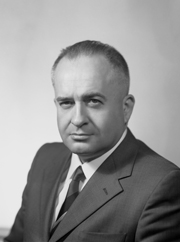

Member of the Senate of the Republic
- In office 25 May 1972 – 22 April 1992
- Constituency: Lombardia, Milan II, Milan III

Personal details
- Born: 30 January 1924 Ferrara, Kingdom of Italy
- Died: 17 October 1997 (aged 73) Milan, Italy
- Party: MSI (1947–1991); MFL (1991–1997)
- Awards: Iron Cross 1st Class, Iron Cross 2nd Class

Giorgio Pisanò (30 January 1924 – 17 October 1997) was an Italian neo-fascist politician, journalist, and essayist who was a member of the Senate of the Republic from 1972 to 1992.

== Early life ==
=== Family and education ===
Pisanò was born on 30 January 1924 in Ferrara, the first of five children to his father Luigi, an Apulian law graduate from San Vito dei Normanni who worked as a civil servant. There he met his future wife, Iolanda Cristanti, in the 1920s, before moving along with his family to Taranto, where he received his high-school diploma during World War II. In 1942, Pisanò joined the Italian Youth of the Lictor (Gioventù Italiana del Littorio, GIL) at the age of 18.

=== World War II ===
As part of GIL during World War II, Pisanò led a company trained in search and rescue following bombing raids. He was in Cassibile on the days the Armistice of Cassibile was signed on 3 September 1943. Along with a group of young fascists, he organized the reopening of the Casa del Fascio, as well as the occupation of the abandoned Gavinana barracks awaiting support from nearby German forces. He soon volunteered for the Decima Flottiglia MAS, asking to be part of the Marine Paratroopers (Nuotatori Paracadutisti, NP), and received training in Jesolo and Tradate. He was intelligence collection missions behind enemy lines, along with Pistoiese soldier Ruy Blas Biagi.

In 1944, Pisanò was captured by British forces during his attempt to return from a special operation near Rome. Although not identified as fascist agent, he was imprisoned for a month in Arezzo. After returning to northern Italy, Pisanò received the Iron Cross 1st and 2nd Class by the Abwehr, and was promoted twice for distinguished service. He served as a 28th "Ruy Blas Blagi" Black Brigade lieutenant in Valtellina during the ending phase of the war, assigned to the special service of the General Headquarters. On 20 April 1945, he joined the Ridotto Alpino Repubblicano; on 27 April, a National Republican Guard Special Border Militia column led by Major Renato Vanna. He was taken prisoner by Italian partisans the next day, on April 28, at Ponte and held in Sondrio, where he reported of firing-squad executions, through May 13, when the Carabinieri took control of the prison.

From 29 August to 26 October 1945, Pisanò remained imprisoned in the San Vittore Prison in Milan. He was then transferred to the Allied concentration camp R707 di Terni, and finally to Rimini, where he remained until November 1946. He reunited with his rattled family following the purging of his father, as he was a state official serving at the prefectures. He began smuggling between Italy and Switzerland before rediscovering politics and journalism, his lifetime profession.

== Career ==
=== Post-war and political militancy ===
In 1947, Pisanò was a co-founder and the first secretary of the Italian Social Movement (Movimento Sociale Italiano, MSI). His career in journalism would begin in 1948 as editor and correspondent for the neo-fascist weekly Meridiano d'Italia. (Note: It was formerly led by Franco De Agazio until his murder in Milan by Volante Rossa in February 1947.) There, together with Franco Maria Servello, he began investigating post-war homicides committed by partisans, many of which were tied to the mystery of the Dongo Treasure. (Note: The Dongo Treasure is commonly understood as the possessions belonged to Benito Mussolini, Clara Petacci, and the regime hierarchs, and was named after Dongo, Lombardy.) Pisanò was a national council member of the Youth Students and Workers Group of the MSI in 1949. In 1951, he founded and held the first presidency in the Lombardy section of Young Italy (Giovane Italia, GI).

=== Journalism and non-fiction writing ===
In 1954, by this time a professional journalist, Pisanò took a job at Oggi, (Note: Accused of having stolen the scoop on the Mussolini diaries at Oggi, Pisanò was summoned to be interviewed by the publishing house Rusconi, which was struck by his personality and dubbed him with the epithet "shyster".) a weekly periodical founded by Angelo Rizzoli, and at that time directed by Edilio Rusconi. In 1958, Pisanò defended Raoul Ghiani in the unsolved Fenaroli murder case, along with the Italcasse scandal, which involved "black funds" to political parties and the granting of questionable loans uncovered in an investigation by the Bank of Italy. As part of a report in a weekly to be published in instalments, Rusconi, who in the meantime had founded Gente magazine, commissioned Pisanò in 1960 to collect all the photographic and documentary material on the Italian Resistance. (Note: Edilio Rusconi, who was deported to the Auschwitz concentration camp, was the first to commission him to investigate the Triangle of Death, an area of northern Italy in which a particularly elevated number of political killings took place between 1943 and 1949.) In the same year, he married Fanny Crespi who bore him two children: Alessandra and Alberto.

In 1963, Pisanò founded the weekly Secolo XX (20th Century) in which he began to controversial public news on "burning issues". He would cause a particular stir following the investigation he published on the mysterious death of the Eni head Enrico Mattei. Alongside his journalistic writing in those years were his essays in historical non-fiction, with several historical revisionist texts about World War II and fascism during the Italian Social Republic period, such as Sangue chiama sangue (1962), La generazione che non si è arresa (1964), Storia della guerra civile in Italia 1943-1945 (1965), Gli ultimi in grigioverde. Storia delle forze armate della Repubblica Sociale Italiana (1943-1945) (1967), Mussolini e gli ebrei (1967), and Penna nera. Storia e battaglie degli alpini d'Italia (1968). In 1965, he spoke at the Conference of the Parco dei Principi Hotel, (Note: The Conference of the Parco dei Principi Hotel is the name by which the Conference on the Revolutionary War became known. It was organized from 3 to 5 May 1965 by the Institute of Military Studies Alberto Pollio at the Parco dei Principi in Rome.) on the revolutionary war based on anti-communism.

In 1968, Pisanò revived the weekly Candido, heir to the one founded by Giovannino Guareschi that had ceased publication in 1961, (Note: In an interview with Giampaolo Pansa in the book La Grande Bugia, his brother Paolo reported that Guareschi, shortly before his death, would have welcomed Piasanò's ideas.) assuming the position of director until 1992. Candido led many journalistic news campaigns, coming to openly denounce the Italian Socialist Party (Partito Socialista Italiano, PSI) leader Giacomo Mancini. (Note: Candido supported the Reggio revolt, dealt with various scandals and events of political, administrative, and financial corruption following the 1968 Belice earthquake and at various companies, such as the National Autonomous Road Company (ANAS), Italcasse, and Italian Resin Society (SIR), and the 1974 Italian oil scandal, that erupted in the country during the 1970s.) His protest against Mancini culminated in being accused by Dino De Laurentiis of extortion in 1971 and his incarceration in Regina Coeli, where he spent 114 days before being acquitted of all charges by the Court of Rome on July 14 and released. On 13 March 1972, Pisanò was a victim of the first attack on the part of the Red Brigades (Brigate Rosse, BR), followed by two others directed against Candido's editors and production facilities. (Note: These events respectively took place on 2 September 1972 and 11 February 1978.) In 1980, Candido ran a particularly virulent campaign aimed at demonstrating that behind Aldo Moro's murder in 1978 there was an interweaving of the interests of shady persons connected to the Lockheed bribery scandals. In 1982, Pisanò covered the death of banker Roberto Calvi, appearing on television with Calvi's bag, delivering it live to the TG2 director of RAI.

=== Senator and final political activities ===
In 1972, Pisanò was elected senator in the Lombardy district as a member of the MSI. During his time as a senator, he notably had a debate with the socialist politician Vittorio Foa during a television broadcast. Foa later recalled that Pisanò was making "grand speeches of pacification" (quoting him as saying "Deep down, we were all patriots... Each of us had our homeland in our hearts..."), at which point he interrupted Pisanò to explain "a fundamental difference", elaborating: "Wait a moment. If we're talking about the dead, fine. The dead are dead: let's respect them all. But if we're talking about when they were alive, they were different. If you had won, I'd still be in prison. Since we won, you're a senator."

Reelected to five consecutive terms (1976, 1979, 1983, and 1987) until 1992, Pisanò was a member of the permanent Parliamentary Committee for Defense and Constitutional Affairs, the Parliamentary Committee of RAI Supervision, the Antimafia Parliamentary Committee and of the Parliamentary Committee of Propaganda Due (P2). From 1980 to 1994, he was city councilor of Cortina d'Ampezzo. A year after the 1988 death of Giorgio Almirante, Pisanò founded a communitarian faction within the MSI; after his exit from the party on 25 July 1991, the faction became the Fascism and Freedom Movement (Movimento Fascismo e Libertà, MFL), with Pisanò as national secretary. The MFL was the only party to expressly refer to Italian fascism with the symbol itself (the fasces), which included and highlighted in the centre a beam of red, making explicit reference to the ideologies of the Italian Social Republic and the Social Right (destra sociale), such as corporatism, the socialization of the economy as highlighted at the Congress of Verona (1943), monetary taxation, and Italian nationalism.

Contemporary trials for violation of the 1952 Scelba law—which criminalized the defence of fascism—led to the acquittal of Pisanò and other members of the party since contrary to the offence identified by law, the party supported a bicameral presidential republic, with the President of the Republic enjoying full powers and elected by the people, instead of the re-establishment of the fascist dictatorship. The party elected some municipal councillors, especially in the province of Asti, on the occasion of the 1992 Italian general election. In the 1990s, Pisanò returned to publishing and writing several texts about the Italian Social Republic. In 1995, after the svolta di Fiuggi—when the MSI made a turning point away from fascist symbolism and neo-fascism towards post-fascism in order to become a bona fide and legal right-wing force in politics—and the definitive transformation of the party into National Alliance (Alleanza Nazionale, AN), the predecessor of Brothers of Italy (Fratelli d'Italia, FdI), Pisanò decided to associate with Pino Rauti in the conservation project of a historic Italian neo-fascist party, which subsequently gave rise to the Tricolour Flame (Fiamma Tricolore, FT). A few months later, he left political life due to his deteriorating health as he was suffering from kidney cancer. After a long illness, Pisanò died in Milan on 17 October 1997.

== Published works ==
Pisanò published various books regarding Italian history.

- Il vero volto della guerra civile. Documentario fotografico, Milan, Rusconi, 1961.
- Sangue chiama sangue, Milan, Pidola, 1962.
- La generazione che non-si è arresa, Milan, Pidola, 1964.
- Giovanni XXIII. Le sue parole, la sua vita, le sue opere e le fotografie più belle. La prima biografia del papa santo, Milan, FPE, 1965.
- Storia della guerra civile in Italia, 1943–1945, 3 vol., Milan, FPE, 1965–1966.
- Gli ultimi in grigioverde. Storia delle forze armate della Repubblica Sociale Italiana (1943–1945), 4 vol., Milan, FPE, 1967.
- Mussolini e gli ebrei, Milan, FPE, 1967.
- Penna nera. Storia e battaglie degli alpini d'Italia, with Giambattista Lombi, 2 vol., Milan, FPE, 1968.
- L'altra faccia del pianeta "P2". Testo integrale della Relazione conclusiva di minoranza presentata al Parlamento dal rappresentante del MSI-DN, Milan, Edizioni del Nuovo Candido, 1984.
- L'omicidio Calvi nell'inchiesta del commissario P2 Giorgio Pisanò e nelle deposizioni della vedova. Con gli atti inediti del processo di Londra, Milan, GEI, 1985.
- Storia del Fascismo, 3 vol., Milan, Pizeta, 1988–1990.
- Il triangolo della morte. La politica della strage in Emilia durante e dopo la guerra civile, with Paolo Pisanò, Milan, Mursia, 1992. ISBN 88-425-1157-9.
- Gli ultimi cinque secondi di Mussolini, Milan, Il Saggiatore, 1996. ISBN 88-428-0350-2.
- Io, fascista, Milan, Il Saggiatore, 1997. ISBN 88-428-0502-5.

== Works cited ==
- Parlato, Giuseppe (2015). "PISANÒ, Giorgio". Dizionario Biografico degli Italiani (in Italian). Vol. 84: Piovene–Ponzo. Rome: Istituto dell'Enciclopedia Italiana. ISBN 978-88-12-00032-6.
