= Roberto Ghiglianovich =

Dalmatian Italian politician (1863–1930)

Senator of the Kingdom of Italy
- In office 15 November 1920 – 7 April 1921

Personal details
- Born: 17 July 1863 Zara, Austrian Empire (today Zadar, Croatia)
- Died: 2 September 1930 (aged 67) Gorizia, Kingdom of Italy
- Awards: Knight of the Order of Saints Maurice and Lazarus

Roberto Ghiglianovich (17 July 1863 – 2 September 1930) was a Dalmatian Italian politician.

== Biography ==
He was grown up in a liberal family in Zara, Austria-Hungary (today Zadar, Croatia). As a child, two of his greatest friends were the Croat Petar Klaić and the Serb Dušan Baljak. Their friendship was so strong that it made him want to learn the Serbo-Croatian language.

He studied law in Graz and Vienna. During his time in Austria, and with the influence of other Dalmatian Italians from the province irredente, he started to develop nationalistic feelings. Upon his return to Zadar, as a lawyer, he began to endeavor in politics ever more.

Although he was open to make some concessions to the Slavs, Ghiglianovich endeavored to get at least Zara annexed to Italy. He endeavored against the "process of discrimination actuated by the municipalities in Croatian hands," thus attempting to preserve the Italian language in schools and in the public administration.

Upon Italy's entry in World War I, he escaped from Austria to Rome, where he was chosen, at the end of the war, member of the Italian delegation to the Paris Peace Conference (1919–1920), as an aggregate in the marine section, as a legal expert for Dalmatia.

Ghiglianovich, who became judge at the Supreme Court of Cassation, was then nominated Senator of the Kingdom of Italy on November 15, 1920.

In the 1920s, he got sick and retired in his hometown Zara (present-day Zadar). He died in Gorizia on September 2, 1930.

== Sources ==
- O. Randi, Il senatore R. Ghiglianovich. Profilo aneddotico, in Rivista dalmatica, XII (1930), 1, pp. 3–27
- R. Montini, Lettere inedite di F. Venezian e di R. G. sulla difesa dell'italianità giuliana e dalmata, in Rass. stor. del Risorgimento, XXXVIII (1951), 3–4, pp. 509–522
- R. Monteleone, La politica dei fuoriusciti irredenti nella Guerra Mondiale, Udine 1972

== Bibliography ==
- L.Monzali, Italiani di Dalmazia. Dal Risorgimento alla Grande Guerra, Le Lettere, Firenze 2004
- L.Monzali, Italiani di Dalmazia. 1914-1924, Le Lettere, Firenze 2007
- D.Salghetti Drioli, Roberto Ghiglianovich, in F.Semi-V.Tacconi (cur.), Istria e Dalmazia. Uomini e tempi. Dalmazia, Del Bianco, Udine 1992
