= Irredentism =

Territorial claim

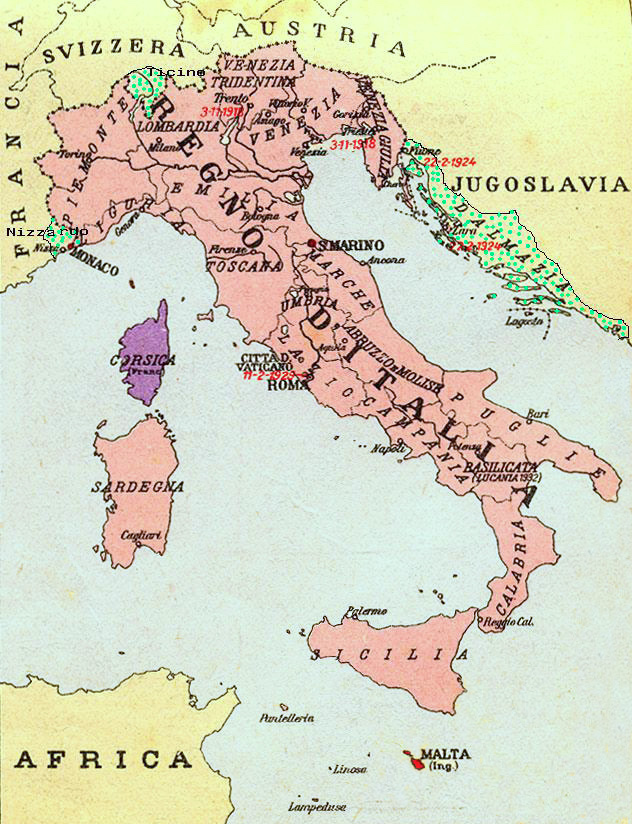
The term originated from the Italian phrase Italia irredenta ("unredeemed Italy"). The green, red and purple areas in this map of Italy from 1919 show some of the areas which were claimed by Italian irredentists.

Irredentism is one state's desire to annex the territory of another state. This desire can be motivated by ethnic reasons because the population of the territory is ethnically similar to or the same as the population of the parent state. (Note: In this context, "parent state" is a technical term for the state that intends to absorb the territory.) Historical reasons may also be responsible, i.e., that the territory previously formed part of the parent state. Difficulties in applying the concept to concrete cases have given rise to academic debates about its precise definition. Disagreements concern whether either or both ethnic and historical reasons have to be present and whether non-state actors can also engage in irredentism. A further dispute is whether attempts to absorb a full neighboring state are also included. There are various types of irredentism. For typical forms of irredentism, the parent state already exists before the territorial conflict with a neighboring state arises. There are also forms of irredentism in which the parent state is newly created by uniting an ethnic group spread across several countries. Another distinction concerns whether the country to which the disputed territory currently belongs is a regular state, a former colony, or a collapsed state.

A central research topic concerning irredentism is the question of how it is to be explained or what causes it. Many explanations hold that ethnic homogeneity within a state makes irredentism more likely. Discrimination against the ethnic group in the neighboring territory is another contributing factor. A closely related explanation argues that national identities based primarily on ethnicity, culture, and history increase irredentist tendencies. Another approach is to explain irredentism as an attempt to increase power and wealth. In this regard, it is argued that irredentist claims are more likely if the neighboring territory is relatively rich. Many explanations also focus on the regime type and hold that democracies are less likely to engage in irredentism while anocracies are particularly open to it.

Irredentism has been an influential force in world politics since the mid-nineteenth century. It has been responsible for many armed conflicts, even though international law is hostile to it and irredentist movements often fail to achieve their goals. The term was originally coined from the Italian phrase Italia irredenta and referred to an Italian movement after 1878 claiming parts of Switzerland and the Austro-Hungarian Empire. Often discussed cases of irredentism include Nazi Germany's annexation of the Sudetenland in 1938, Somalia's invasion of Ethiopia in 1977, and Argentina's invasion of the Falkland Islands in 1982. Further examples are attempts to establish a Greater Serbia following the breakup of Yugoslavia in the early 1990s and Russia's annexation of Crimea in 2014.

Irredentism is closely related to revanchism and secession. Revanchism is an attempt to annex territory belonging to another state. It is motivated by the goal of taking revenge for a previous grievance, in contrast to the goal of irredentism of building an ethnically unified nation-state. In the case of secession, a territory breaks away and forms an independent state instead of merging with another state.

== Definition and etymology ==
The term irredentism was coined from the Italian phrase Italia irredenta (literally, 'unredeemed Italy'). This phrase originally referred to territory in Austria-Hungary that was mostly or partly inhabited by ethnic Italians. In particular, it applies to Trentino and Trieste, but also Gorizia, Istria, Fiume, and Dalmatia during the 19th and early 20th centuries. Irredentist projects often use the term Greater to label the desired outcome of their expansion, as in Greater Serbia or Greater Russia.

Irredentism is often understood as the claim that territories belonging to one state should be incorporated into another state because their population is ethnically similar or because it historically belonged to the other state before. Many definitions of irredentism have been proposed to give a more precise formulation. Despite a wide overlap concerning its general features, there is no consensus about its exact characterization. The disagreements matter for evaluating whether irredentism was the cause of war which is difficult in many cases and different definitions often lead to opposite conclusions.

There is wide consensus that irredentism is a form of territorial dispute involving the attempt to annex territories belonging to a neighboring state. However, not all such attempts constitute forms of irredentism and there is no academic consensus on precisely what other features need to be present. This concerns disagreements about who claims the territory, for what reasons they do so, and how much territory is claimed. Most scholars define irredentism as a claim made by one state on the territory of another state. In this regard, there are three essential entities to irredentism: an irredentist state or parent state, a neighboring host state or target state, and the disputed territory belonging to the host state, often referred to as irredenta. According to this definition, popular movements demanding territorial change by non-state actors do not count as irredentist in the strict sense. A different definition characterizes irredentism as the attempt of an ethnic minority to break away and join their "real" motherland even though this minority is a non-state actor.

The reason for engaging in territorial conflict is another issue, with some scholars stating that irredentism is primarily motivated by ethnicity. In this view, the population in the neighboring territory is ethnically similar and the intention is to retrieve the area to unite the people. This definition implies, for example, that the majority of the border disputes in the history of Latin America were not forms of irredentism. Usually, irredentism is defined in terms of the motivation of the irredentist state, even if the territory is annexed against the will of the local population. Other theorists focus more on the historical claim that the disputed territory used to be part of the state's ancestral homeland. This is close to the literal meaning of the original Italian expression terra irredenta as "unredeemed land". In this view, the ethnicity of the people inhabiting this territory is not important. However, it is also possible to combine both characterizations, i.e. that the motivation is either ethnic or historical or both. Some scholars, like Benjamin Neuberger, include geographical reasons in their definitions.

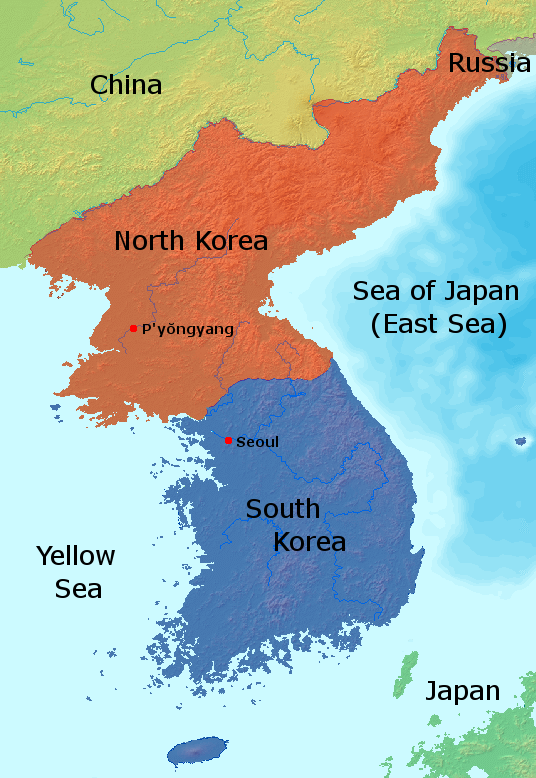
It depends on the definition of irredentism whether South Korea's and North Korea's claim over the entire Korean Peninsula constitutes a form of irredentism.

A further disagreement concerns the amount of area that is to be annexed. Usually, irredentism is restricted to the attempt to incorporate some parts of another state. In this regard, irredentism challenges established borders with the neighboring state but does not challenge the existence of the neighboring state in general. However, some definitions of irredentism also include attempts to absorb the whole neighboring state and not just a part of it. In this sense, claims by both South Korea and North Korea to incorporate the whole of the Korean Peninsula would be considered a form of irredentism.

A popular view combining many of the elements listed above holds that irredentism is based on incongruence between the borders of a state and the boundaries of the corresponding nation. State borders are usually clearly delimited, both physically and on maps. National boundaries, on the other hand, are less tangible since they correspond to a group's perception of its historic, cultural, and ethnic boundaries. Irredentism may manifest if state borders do not correspond to national boundaries. The objective of irredentism is to enlarge a state to establish a congruence between its borders and the boundaries of the corresponding nation.

== Types ==
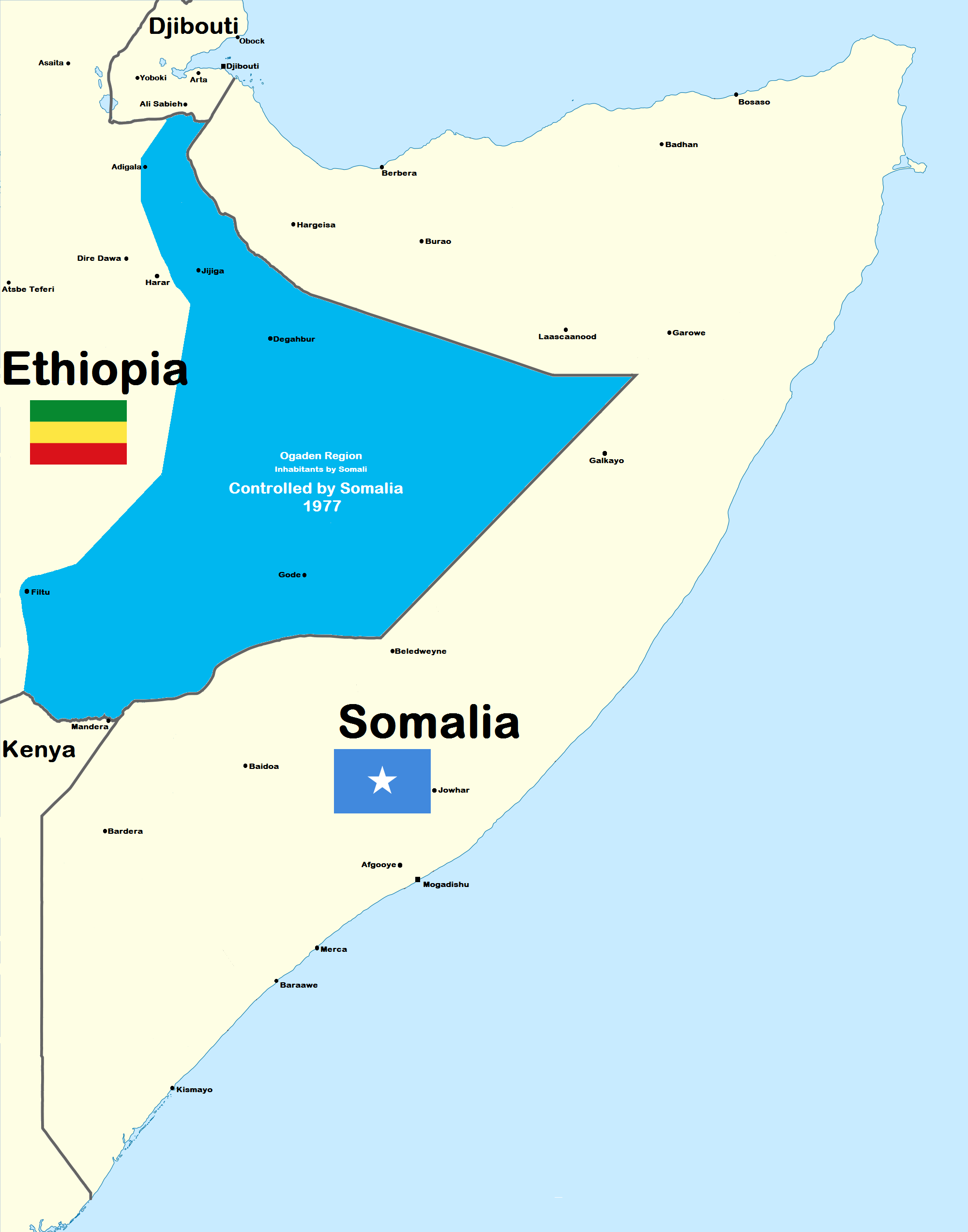
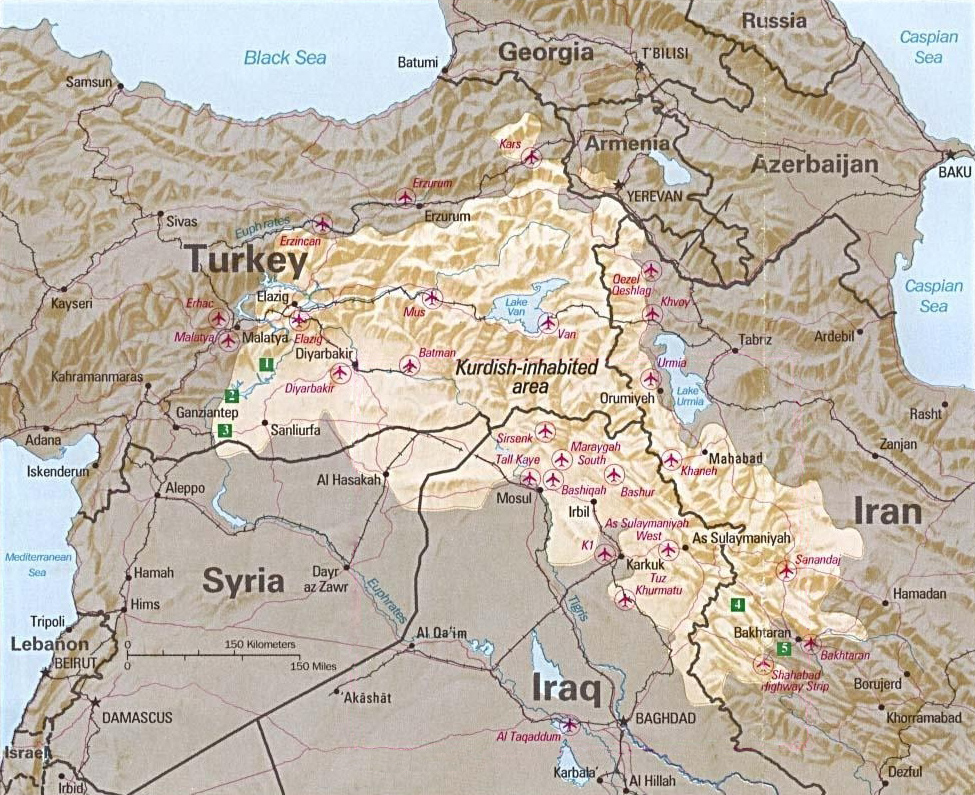
Somalia's occupation of Ethiopian territory constitutes a typical case of irredentism between two states (left). The desire to create a Kurdistan state composed of Kurds living in Iraq, Iran, Syria, and Turkey is an unusual type of irredentism since there is no pre-existing state to absorb the territories (right).

Various types of irredentism have been proposed. However, not everyone agrees that all the types listed here constitute forms of irredentism and it often depends on what definition is used. According to political theorists Naomi Chazan and Donald L. Horowitz, there are two types of irredentism. The typical case involves one state that intends to annex territories belonging to a neighboring state. Nazi Germany’s claim on the Sudetenland of Czechoslovakia is an example of this form of irredentism.

For the second type, there is no pre-existing parent state. Instead, a cohesive group existing as a minority in multiple countries intends to unify to form a new parent state. The intended creation of a Kurdistan state uniting the Kurds living in Turkey, Syria, Iraq, and Iran is an example of the second type. If such a project is successful for only one segment, the result is secession and not irredentism. This happened, for example, during the breakup of Yugoslavia when Yugoslavian Slovenes formed the new state of Slovenia while the Austrian Slovenes did not join them and remained part of Austria. Not all theorists accept that the second type constitutes a form of irredentism. In this regard, it is often argued that it is too similar to secession to maintain a distinction between the two. For example, political scholar Benyamin Neuberger holds that a pre-existing parent state is necessary for irredentism.

Political scientist Thomas Ambrosio restricts his definition to cases involving a pre-existing parent state and distinguishes three types of irredentism: between two states, between a state and a former colony, and between a state and a collapsed state. The typical case is between two states. A textbook example of this is Somalia's invasion of Ethiopia. In the second case of decolonization, the territory to be annexed is a former colony of another state and not a regular part of it. An example is the Indonesian invasion and occupation of the former Portuguese colony of East Timor. In the case of state collapse, one state disintegrates and a neighboring state absorbs some of its former territories. This was the case for the irredentist movements by Croatia and Serbia during the breakup of Yugoslavia.

== Explanations ==
Explanations of irredentism try to determine what causes irredentism, how it unfolds, and how it can be peacefully resolved. Various hypotheses have been proposed but there is still very little consensus on how irredentism is to be explained despite its prevalence and its long history of provoking armed conflicts. Some of these proposals can be combined but others conflict with each other and the available evidence may not be sufficient to decide between them. An active research topic in this regard concerns the reasons for irredentism. Many countries have ethnic kin outside their borders. But only a few are willing to engage in violent conflicts to annex foreign territory in an attempt to unite their kin. Research on the causes of irredentism tries to explain why some countries pursue irredentism but others do not. Relevant factors often discussed include ethnicity, nationalism, economic considerations, the desire to increase power, and the type of regime.

=== Ethnicity and nationalism ===
Hungarian irredentism in the 1930s contributed to Hungary's decision to ally with Nazi Germany.

A common explanation of irredentism focuses on ethnic arguments. It is based on the observation that irredentist claims are primarily advanced by states with a homogenous ethnic population. This is explained by the idea that, if a state is composed of several ethnic groups, then annexing a territory inhabited primarily by one of those groups would shift the power balance in favor of this group. For this reason, other groups in the state are likely to internally reject the irredentist claims. This inhibiting factor is not present for homogeneous states. A similar argument is also offered for the enclave to be annexed: an ethnically heterogenous enclave is less likely to desire to be absorbed by another state for ethnic reasons since this would only benefit one ethnic group. These considerations explain, for example, why irredentism is not very common in Africa since most African states are ethnically heterogeneous. Relevant factors for the ethnic motivation for irredentism are how large the dominant ethnic group is relative to other groups and how large it is in absolute terms. It also matters whether the ethnic group is relatively dispersed or located in a small core area and whether it is politically disadvantaged.

Explanations focusing on nationalism are closely related to ethnicity-based explanations. Nationalism can be defined as the claim that the boundaries of a state should match those of the nation. According to constructivist accounts, for example, the dominant national identity is one of the central factors behind irredentism. In this view, identities based on ethnicity, culture, and history can easily invite tendencies to enlarge national borders. They may justify the goal of integrating ethnically and culturally similar territories. Civic national identities focusing more on a political nature, on the other hand, are more closely tied to pre-existing national boundaries.

Structural accounts use a slightly different approach and focus on the relationship between nationalism and the regional context. They focus on the tension between state sovereignty and national self-determination. State sovereignty is the principle of international law holding that each state has sovereignty over its own territory. It means that states are not allowed to interfere with essentially domestic affairs of other states. National self-determination, on the other hand, concerns the right of people to determine their own international political status. According to the structural explanation, emphasis on national self-determination may legitimize irredentist claims while the principle of state sovereignty defends the status quo of the existing sovereign borders. This position is supported by the observation that irredentist conflicts are much more common during times of international upheavals.

The Nagorno-Karabakh conflict is an example of how humanitarian concerns are invoked as a rationale to support an irredentist or independence movement.

Another factor commonly cited as a force fueling irredentism is discrimination against the main ethnic group in the enclave. Irredentist states often try to legitimize their aggression against neighbors by presenting them as humanitarian interventions aimed at protecting their discriminated ethnic kin. This justification was used, for example, in Armenia's engagement in the Nagorno-Karabakh conflict, in Serbia's involvement in the Croatian War of Independence, and in Russia's annexation of Crimea. Some political theorists, like David S. Siroky and Christopher W. Hale, hold that there is little empirical evidence for arguments based on ethnic homogeneity and discrimination. In this view, they are mainly used as a pretext to hide other goals, such as material gain.

Another relevant factor is the outlook of the population inhabiting the territory to be annexed. The desire of the irredentist state to annex a foreign territory and the desire of that territory to be annexed do not always overlap. In some cases, a minority group does not want to be annexed, as was the case for the Crimean Tatars in Russia's annexation of Crimea. In other cases, a minority group would want to be annexed but the intended parent state is not interested.

=== Power and economy ===
Various accounts stress the role of power and economic benefits as reasons for irredentism. Realist explanations focus on the power balance between the irredentist state and the target state: the more this power balance shifts in favor of the irredentist state, the more likely violent conflicts become. A key factor in this regard is also the reaction of the international community, i.e. whether irredentist claims are tolerated or rejected. Irredentism can be used as a tool or pretext to increase the parent state's power. Rational choice theories study how irredentism is caused by decision-making processes of certain groups within a state. In this view, irredentism is a tool used by elites to secure their political interests. They do so by appealing to popular nationalist sentiments. This can be used, for example, to gain public support against political rivals or to divert attention away from domestic problems.

Other explanations focus on economic factors. For example, larger states enjoy advantages that come with having an increased market and decreased per capita cost of defense. However, there are also disadvantages to having a bigger state, such as the challenges that come with accommodating a wider range of citizens' preferences. Based on these lines of thought, it has been argued that states are more likely to advocate irredentist claims if the enclave is a relatively rich territory.

=== Regime type ===
An additional relevant factor is the regime type of both the irredentist state and the neighboring state. In this regard, it is often argued that democratic states are less likely to engage in irredentism. One reason cited is that democracies often are more inclusive of other ethnic groups. Another is that democracies are in general less likely to engage in violent conflicts. This is closely related to democratic peace theory, which claims that democracies try to avoid armed conflicts with other democracies. This is also supported by the observation that most irredentist conflicts are started by authoritarian regimes. However, irredentism constitutes a paradox for democratic systems. The reason is that democratic ideals pertaining to the ethnic group can often be used to justify its claim, which may be interpreted as the expression of a popular will toward unification. But there are also cases of irredentism made primarily by a government that is not broadly supported by the population.

According to Siroky and Hale, anocratic regimes are most likely to engage in irredentist conflicts and to become their victim. This is based on the idea that they share some democratic ideals favoring irredentism but often lack institutional stability and accountability. This makes it more likely for the elites to consolidate their power using ethno-nationalist appeals to the masses.

== Importance, reactions, and consequences ==
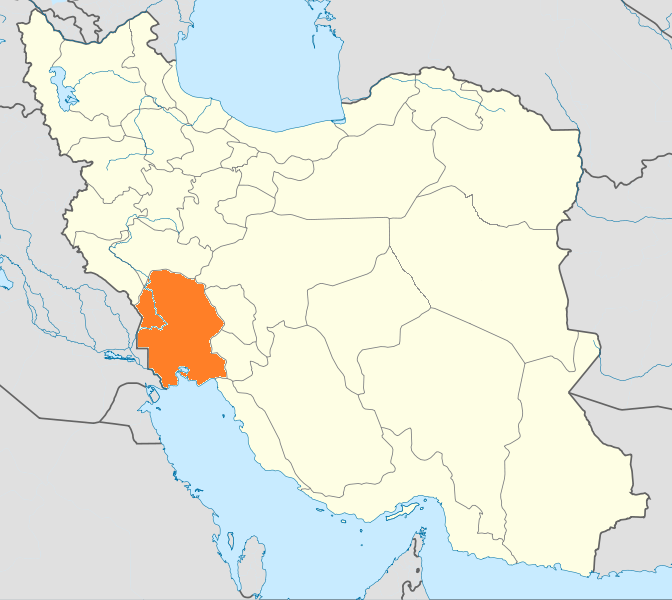
In the Iran–Iraq War (1980–1988), Saddam Hussein's Iraq claimed it had the right to hold sovereignty to the east bank of the Shatt al-Arab river held by Iran. The war claimed the lives of more than a million people.

Irredentism is a widespread phenomenon and has been an influential force in world politics since the mid-nineteenth century. It has been responsible for countless conflicts. There are still many unresolved irredentist disputes today that constitute discords between nations. In this regard, irredentism is a potential source of conflict in many places and often escalates into military confrontations between states. For example, international relation theorist Markus Kornprobst argues that "no other issue over which states fight is as war-prone as irredentism". Political scholar Rachel Walker points out that "there is scarcely a country in the world that is not involved in some sort of irredentist quarrel ... although few would admit to this". Political theorists Stephen M. Saideman and R. William Ayres argue that many of the most important conflicts of the 1990s were caused by irredentism, such as the wars for a Greater Serbia and a Greater Croatia. Irredentism carries a lot of potential for future conflicts since many states have kin groups in adjacent countries. It has been argued that it poses a significant danger to human security and the international order. For these reasons, irredentism has been a central topic in the field of international relations.

For the most part, international law is hostile to irredentism. For example, the United Nations Charter calls for respect for established territorial borders and defends state sovereignty. Similar outlooks are taken by the Organization of African Unity, the Organization of American States, and the Helsinki Final Act. Since irredentist claims are based on conflicting sovereignty assertions, it is often difficult to find a working compromise. Peaceful resolutions of irredentist conflicts often result in mutual recognition of de facto borders rather than territorial change. International relation theorists Martin Griffiths et al. argue that the threat of rising irredentism may be reduced by focusing on political pluralism and respect for minority rights.

Irredentist movements, peaceful or violent, are rarely successful. In many cases, despite aiming to help ethnic minorities, irredentism often has the opposite effect and ends up worsening their living conditions. On the one hand, the state still in control of those territories may decide to further discriminate against them as an attempt to decrease the threat to its national security. On the other hand, the irredentist state may merely claim to care about the ethnic minorities but, in truth, use such claims only as a pretext to increase its territory or to destabilize an opponent.

== Often-discussed examples ==
The emergence of irredentism is tied to the rise of modern nationalism and the idea of a nation-state, which are often linked to the French Revolution. However, some political scholars, like Griffiths et al., argue that phenomena similar to irredentism existed even before. For example, part of the justification for the crusades was to liberate fellow Christians from Muslim rule and to redeem the Holy Land. Nonetheless, most theorists see irredentism as a more recent phenomenon. The term was coined in the 19th century and is linked to border disputes between modern states.

The Megali Idea was a nationalist and irredentist project that shaped Greek history from the War of Independence in the 1820s through the Balkan Wars in the beginning of the 20th century, aiming to unite the Greek population in a single state. It led to the expansion of the Greek state in several stages, either through military conquest or diplomacy. The influence of the Megali Idea started to fade after the Greco-Turkish War (1919–1922), followed by the population exchange between Greece and Turkey in 1923.

The partition of Czechoslovakia from 1938 through 1939. The dark purple area shows the Sudetenland annexed by Nazi Germany.

Nazi Germany's annexation of the Sudetenland in 1938 is an often-cited example of irredentism. At the time, the Sudetenland formed part of Czechoslovakia but had a majority German population. Adolf Hitler justified the annexation based on his allegation that Sudeten Germans were being mistreated by the Czechoslovak government. The Sudetenland was yielded to Germany following the Munich Agreement in an attempt to prevent the outbreak of a major war.

Somalia's invasion of Ethiopia in 1977 is frequently discussed as a case of African irredentism. The goal of this attack was to unite the significant Somali population living in the Ogaden region with their kin by annexing this area to create a Greater Somalia. The invasion escalated into a war of attrition that lasted about eight months. Somalia came close to achieving its objective but ultimately failed, primarily because of the Soviet and Cuban military intervention in support of Ethiopia.

The Falkland Islands is a British Overseas Territory but claimed by Argentina.

Argentina's invasion of the Falkland Islands in 1982 is cited as an example of irredentism in South America, where the Argentine military government sought to exploit national sentiment over the islands to deflect attention from domestic concerns. President Juan Perón exploited the issue to reduce British influence in Argentina, instituting educational reform teaching the islands were Argentine and creating a strong nationalist sentiment over the issue. The war ended with a victory for the UK after about two months even though many analysts considered the Argentine military position unassailable. Although defeated, Argentina did not officially declare the cessation of hostilities until 1989 and successive Argentine governments have continued to claim the islands. The islands are now self-governing with the UK responsible for defence and foreign relations. Referendums in 1986 and 2013 show a preference for British sovereignty among the population. Both the UK and Spain claimed sovereignty in the 18th Century and Argentina claims the islands as a colonial legacy from independence in 1816.

The breakup of Yugoslavia in the early 1990s resulted in various irredentist projects. They include Slobodan Milošević's attempts to establish a Greater Serbia by absorbing some regions of neighboring states that were part of former Yugoslavia. A simultaneous similar project aimed at the establishment of a Greater Croatia.

Regions of Ukraine annexed by Russia since 2014 (Crimea) and 2022 (Donetsk, Kherson, Luhansk and Zaporizhzhia), with a red line marking the area of actual control by Russia on 30 September 2022

Russia's annexation of Crimea in 2014 is a more recent example of irredentism. Beginning in the 15th century CE, the Crimean peninsula was a Tartar Khanate. However, in 1783 the Russian Empire broke a previous treaty and annexed Crimea. In 1954, when both Russia and Ukraine were part of the Soviet Union, it was transferred from Russia to Ukraine. Sixty years later, Russia alleged that the Ukrainian government did not uphold the rights of ethnic Russians inhabiting Crimea, using this as a justification for the annexation in March 2014. However, it has been claimed that this was only a pretext to increase its territory and power. Ultimately, Russia invaded the mainland territory of Ukraine in February 2022, thereby escalating the war that continues to the present day.

Other frequently discussed cases of irredentism include disputes between Pakistan and India over Jammu and Kashmir as well as China's claims on Taiwan.

== Related concepts ==
=== Ethnicity ===
Ethnicity plays a central role in irredentism since most irredentist states justify their expansionist agenda based on shared ethnicity. In this regard, the goal of unifying parts of an ethnic group in a common nation-state is used as a justification for annexing foreign territories and going to war if the neighboring state resists. Ethnicity is a grouping of people according to a set of shared attributes and similarities. It divides people into groups based on attributes like physical features, customs, tradition, historical background, language, culture, religion, and values. Not all these factors are equally relevant for every ethnic group. For some groups, one factor may predominate, as in ethno-linguistic, ethno-racial, and ethno-religious identities. In most cases, ethnic identities are based on a set of common features.

A central aspect of many ethnic identities is that all members share a common homeland or place of origin. This place of origin does not have to correspond to the area where the majority of the ethnic group currently lives in case they migrated from their homeland. Another feature is a common language or dialect. In many cases, religion also forms a vital aspect of ethnicity. Shared culture is another significant factor. It is a wide term and can include characteristic social institutions, diet, dress, and other practices. It is often difficult to draw clear boundaries between people based on their ethnicity. For this reason, some definitions focus less on actual objective features and stress instead that what unites an ethnic group is a subjective belief that such common features exist. In this view, the common belief matters more than the extent to which those shared features actually exist. Examples of large ethnic groups are the Han Chinese, the Arabs, the Bengalis, the Punjabis, and the Turks.

Some theorists, like sociologist John Milton Yinger, use terms like ethnic group or ethnicity as near-synonyms for nation. Nations are usually based on ethnicity but what sets them apart from ethnicity is their political form as a state or a state-like entity. The physical and visible aspects of ethnicity, such as skin color and facial features, are often referred to as race, which may thus be understood as a subset of ethnicity. However, some theorists, like sociologist Pierre van den Berghe, contrast the two by restricting ethnicity to cultural traits and race to physical traits.

Ethnic solidarity can provide a sense of belonging as well as physical and mental security. It can help people identify with a common purpose. However, ethnicity has also been the source of many conflicts. It has been responsible for various forms of mass violence, including ethnic cleansing and genocide. The perpetrators usually form part of the ruling majority and target ethnic minority groups. Not all ethnic-based conflicts involve mass violence, like many forms of ethnic discrimination.

=== Nationalism and nation-state ===
Irredentism is often seen as a product of modern nationalism, i.e. the claim that a nation should have its own sovereign state. In this regard, irredentism emerged with and depends on the modern idea of nation-states. The start of modern nationalism is often associated with the French Revolution in 1789. This spawned various nationalist revolutions in Europe around the mid-nineteenth century. They often resulted in a replacement of dynastic imperial governments. A central aspect of nationalism is that it sees states as entities with clearly delimited borders that should correspond to national boundaries. Irredentism reflects the importance people ascribe to these borders and how exactly they are drawn. One difficulty in this regard is that the exact boundaries are often difficult to justify and are therefore challenged in favor of alternatives. Irredentism manifests some of the most aggressive aspects of modern nationalism. It can be seen as a side effect of nationalism paired with the importance it ascribes to borders and the difficulties in agreeing on them.

=== Secession ===
Surrounding the events of the American Civil War, various southern states (shown in bright and dark red) seceded from the United States.

Irredentism is closely related to secession. Secession can be defined as "an attempt by an ethnic group claiming a homeland to withdraw with its territory from the authority of a larger state of which it is a part." Irredentism, by contrast, is initiated by members of an ethnic group in one state to incorporate territories across their border housing ethnically kindred people. Secession happens when a part of an existing state breaks away to form an independent entity. This was the case, for example, in the United States, when many of the slaveholding southern states decided to secede from the Union to form the Confederate States of America in 1861.

In the case of irredentism, the break-away area does not become independent but merges into another entity. Irredentism is often seen as a government decision, unlike secession. Both movements are influential phenomena in contemporary politics but, as Horowitz argues, secession movements are much more frequent in postcolonial states. However, he also holds that secession movements are less likely to succeed since they usually have very few military resources compared to irredentist states. For this reason, they normally need prolonged external assistance, often from another state. However, such state policies are subject to change. For example, the Indian government supported the Sri Lankan Tamil secessionists up to 1987 but then reach an agreement with the Sri Lankan government and helped suppress the movement.

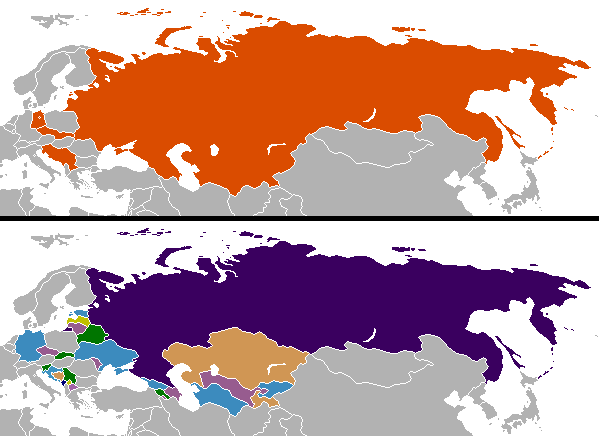
Changes in national boundaries after the end of the Cold War and the dissolution of the Soviet Union and breakup of Yugoslavia

Horowitz holds that it is important to distinguish secessionist and irredentist movements since they differ significantly concerning their motivation, context, and goals. Despite these differences, irredentism and secessionism are closely related nonetheless. In some cases, the two tendencies may exist side by side. It is also possible that the advocates of one movement change their outlook and promote the other. Whether a movement favors irredentism or secessionism is determined, among other things, by the prospects of forming an independent state in contrast to joining another state. A further factor is whether the irredentist state is likely to espouse a similar ideology to the one found in the territory intending to break away. The anticipated reaction of the international community is an additional factor, i.e. whether it would embrace, tolerate, or reject the detachment or the absorption by another state.

=== Revanchism ===
Irredentism and revanchism are closely related, differing in terms of motive. Irredentism has a positive goal of building a "greater" state that fulfills the ideals of a nation-state. It aims to unify people claimed to belong together through their shared national identity based on ethnicity, culture, and history.

The goal for revanchism is more negative because it focuses on revenge for some earlier grievance or injustice and aims to reverse territorial losses due to a previous defeat. Contrasting irredentism with revanchism, political scientist Anna M. Wittmann argues that Germany's annexation of the Sudetenland in 1938 constitutes irredentism because of its emphasis on a shared language and ethnicity, whereas Germany's invasion of Poland the following year constitutes revanchism due to its justification as revenge for previous territorial losses. The term "revanchism" comes from the French term revanche, meaning revenge. It was originally used in the aftermath of the Franco-Prussian War for nationalists intending to reclaim the lost territory of Alsace-Lorraine. Saddam Hussein justified the Iraqi invasion of Kuwait in 1990 by claiming Kuwait had always been an integral part of Iraq and only became an independent nation due to the interference of the British Empire.

== See also ==
- Ethnic nationalism – Ethnic identity-based political ideology
- Expansionism – Consists of policies of states that involve territorial or economic expansion
- Lebensraum – 1890s–1940s German expansionist concept
- Mutilated victory – Italian nationalist term
- Racial nationalism – Ideology that advocates a racial definition of national identity
- Religious nationalism – Relationship between national identity and religion
- Separatism – Advocacy for separation from a larger group
- Decolonization – Undoing political, economic and cultural legacies of colonisation
- Secession – Formal withdrawal of a group from a political entity
- Manifest destiny – 19th-century expansionist belief in the U.S.
- Pan-nationalism – Nationalism beyond national boundaries
- Phyletism – Heresy of ethnic church divisions
- Reactionary – Political view advocating return to a previous societal state
- Rump state – Reduced territory of a once-larger state
- Status quo ante bellum – Latin phrase meaning 'the state existing before the war'
- Territorial dispute – Boundary dispute
