= Italian irredentism in Istria =

Political movement in Italy

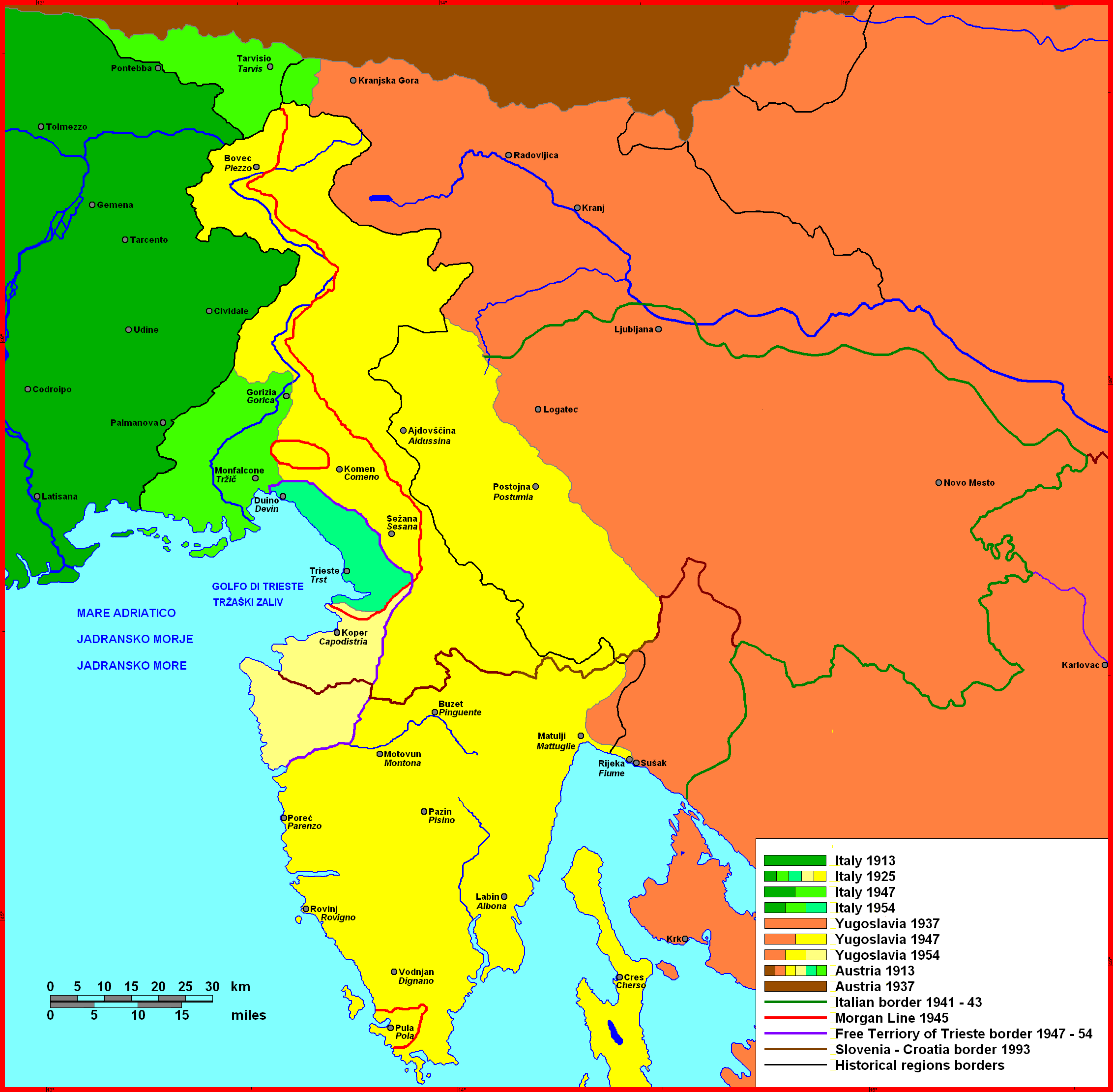
Changes to the Italian eastern border from 1920 to 1975. The Austrian Littoral, later renamed Julian March, which was assigned to Italy in 1920 with the Treaty of Rapallo (with adjustments of its border in 1924 after the Treaty of Rome) and which was then ceded to Yugoslavia in 1947 with the Treaty of Paris Areas annexed to Italy in 1920 and remained Italian even after 1947 Areas annexed to Italy in 1920, passed to the Free Territory of Trieste in 1947 with the Paris treaties and definitively assigned to Italy in 1975 with the Treaty of Osimo Areas annexed to Italy in 1920, passed to the Free Territory of Trieste in 1947 with the Paris treaties and definitively assigned to Yugoslavia in 1975 with the Osimo treaty

The Italian irredentism in Istria is the irredentist political movement supporting the annexation of the Istrian Peninsula to Italy. It is considered closely related to the Italian irredentism in Trieste and Rijeka (Fiume), two cities bordering the peninsula.

== History ==
Istria was a part of the Roman Empire from 177 BC, then part of Roman Italy as part of the Venetia et Histria. This political administration lasted also under the constitution of the Germanic Kingdom of Italy led by Odoacer, then Theodoric and also as part of the Eastern Roman Empire until the arrival of the Lombards, who eventually occupied it. Around the beginning of the 7th century, Slavic incursions began around Istria and by the middle of the century, they began to settle in the region.

The area later came under the Carolingian Empire and subsequently became part of the March of Verona. It was included into the territory of the Patriarchate of Aquileia before coming under Venetian rule around the 13th century and remained under it until the state's dissolution following its defeat to Napoleon in 1797. Istria was then aggregated to the Napoleonic Kingdom of Italy in 1805, and annexed to the Illyrian Provinces in 1809.

When Napoleon conquered the territory of Istria, he found that Istria was populated by Italians on the coast and in the main cities, but the interior was populated mainly by Croats and Slovenians: this multi-ethnic population in the same peninsula created a situation of antagonism between Slovenes, Croats and Italians, when started the first nationalisms after Napoleon's fall. Following 1815, Istria became a part of the Austrian monarchy, and Croats, Slovenians and Italians engaged in a nationalistic feud with each other. Following Napoleon's defeat, Istria became part of the Kingdom of Illyria and later the Austrian Littoral as the Margraviate of Istria. A census in 1910 found that 38.1% of the population of Istria was Italian, as opposed to 43.5% Serbo-Croatian and 14.3% Slovene. This census did not count ethnic groups but rather the "language of daily interaction" (German: Umgangssprache).

As a consequence, Istria was a theater of a nationalistic ethnic struggle between them during the 19th and 20th centuries. Italian irredentism was actively followed by many Italians in Istria, such as the Italian sailor and irredentist Nazario Sauro, native to Koper (Capodistria).

Between 1918 and 1947 Istria was part of the Kingdom of Italy. Followings its annexation from Austria, the Italian government pursued Italianisation of the peninsula. Italians from elsewhere, primarily the south, were also resettled to Istria. Due to the efforts of the Italian government ruled by Benito Mussolini, the number of Slovenes and Croats in the Julian March diminished from 466,730 in 1918 to 382,113 in 1936 (a 19% decrease), while the number of Italians rose from 354,908 to 559,553 (a 57% increase).

From 1923 onwards and then under the Mussolini government, assimilation of non-Italian people became a national focus. Methods included shutting down Slovene and Croatian schools and public institutions, gerrymandering to reduce the number of Slovene representatives in Rome, pushing Slovene and Croatian priests and teachers from Istria to Yugoslavia or other areas. In 1927, a law was passed that Italianised Slavic names in Istria. In response to these, the militant anti-fascist guerilla TIGR (a Slovene acronym for Trieste (Trst), Istria (Istra), Gorizia (Gorica) and Rijeka (Reka).) was founded in 1927.

Following the end of World War II, Istria was divided between the newly created Socialist Federal Republic of Yugoslavia and the Free Territory of Trieste in north-western Istria, which was then divided between Yugoslavia and Italy. Following the division, up to 40,000 Istrian Italians chose to leave the Yugoslav partition. Following World War II, around 350,000 Italians chose to leave Istria and Dalmatia. Many Italian communists also immigrated to Istria, believing that Yugoslavia was the only place where they could build a socialist society. However, they were accused of stalinism by the Yugoslav government and many were sent to concentration camps.

Since the end of World War II, irredentism has largely disappeared in Istria, in most part because of the Istrian exodus.

Istria is today primarily populated by Croats in Croatian Istria and Slovenes in Slovenian Istria, but a minority of Istrian Italians still exist. The 2002 census in Slovenia recorded 2,258 Italians while the Croatian Istria County and Primorje-Gorski Kotar County combined recorded 13,220 Italians.

== Italian irredentism ==
After Napoleon's conquest and the rise of ethnic nationalism, the idea of "unification" of all the Italian people in a "united Italy" started to be developed by intellectuals in the region like Carlo Combi, a native to Istria. As a consequence, Italian irredentism promoted the unification of those areas not included in the creation of the Kingdom of Italy after 1861: Istria was one of those.

The irredentist ideas of the Italian nationalists became stronger after the unification of Italy (1861). The main representatives of these ideas in historical writings are Pacifico Valussi and the Istrians Carlo Combi, Tommaso Luciani and Sigismondo Bonfiglio. Opinion about the Slavs had entirely changed: they were seen as peasant folk unable to build a nation of their own and therefore condemned to be assimilated within an Italian identity. And they already envisaged the frontiers of Italy extending to the Oriental Alps and to Arsa, some even to Fiume/Rijeka.

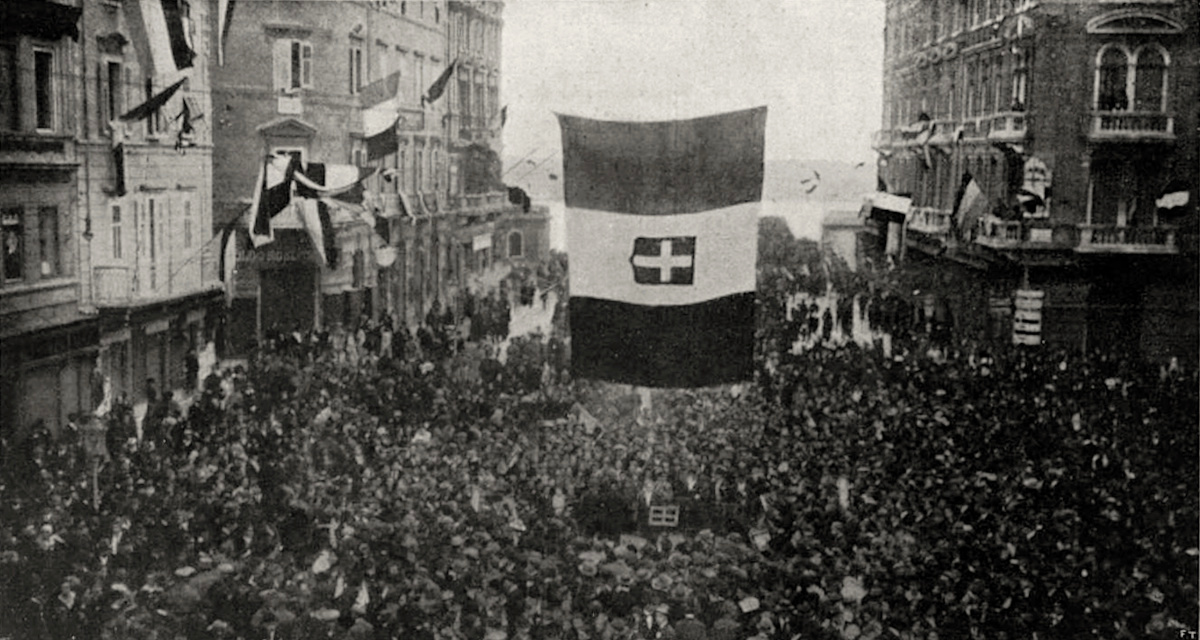
The birthday celebration of the Italian king Victor Emmanuel III in Fiume (Rijeka) on 11 November 1918

Many Italians in Istria supported the Italian Risorgimento and, because of this, the Austrian authorities began to view the Italians as enemies and began to favour the Slavic communities of Istria. During the meeting of the Council of Ministers of 12 November 1866, Emperor Franz Joseph I of Austria outlined a wide-ranging project aimed at the Germanisation or Slavicisation of the areas of the empire with an Italian presence:

His Majesty expressed the precise order that action be taken decisively against the influence of the Italian elements still present in some regions of the Crown and, appropriately occupying the posts of public, judicial, masters employees as well as with the influence of the press, work in South Tyrol, Dalmatia and Littoral for the Germanization and Slavization of these territories according to the circumstances, with energy and without any regard. His Majesty calls the central offices to the strong duty to proceed in this way to what has been established.

— Franz Joseph I of Austria, Council of the Crown of 12 November 1866

As Italian was the language of administration, education, the press, and the Austrian navy before 1859, people who wished to acquire higher social standing and separate themselves from the Slavic peasantry began to accept and adopt the Italian language. In the years after 1866, Italians lost their privileges in Austria-Hungary, their assimilation of the Slavic people came to an end, and they found themselves under growing pressure by other rising nations; with italianised Slavs reverted to being Croats. Austrian rulers found use of the racial antagonism and financed Croatian schools and promoted Croatian as the official language, causing many Italians to choose voluntary exile.

According to the 1910 Austrian census, out of 404,309 inhabitants in the March of Istria, 168,116 (41.6%) spoke Croatian, 147,416 (36.5%) spoke Italian, 55,365 (13.7%) spoke Slovene, 13,279 (3.3%) spoke German, 882 (0.2%) spoke Romanian, 2,116 (0.5%) spoke other languages and 17,135 (4.2%) were non-citizens, which had not been asked for their language of communication.

Ethnic maps of Istria

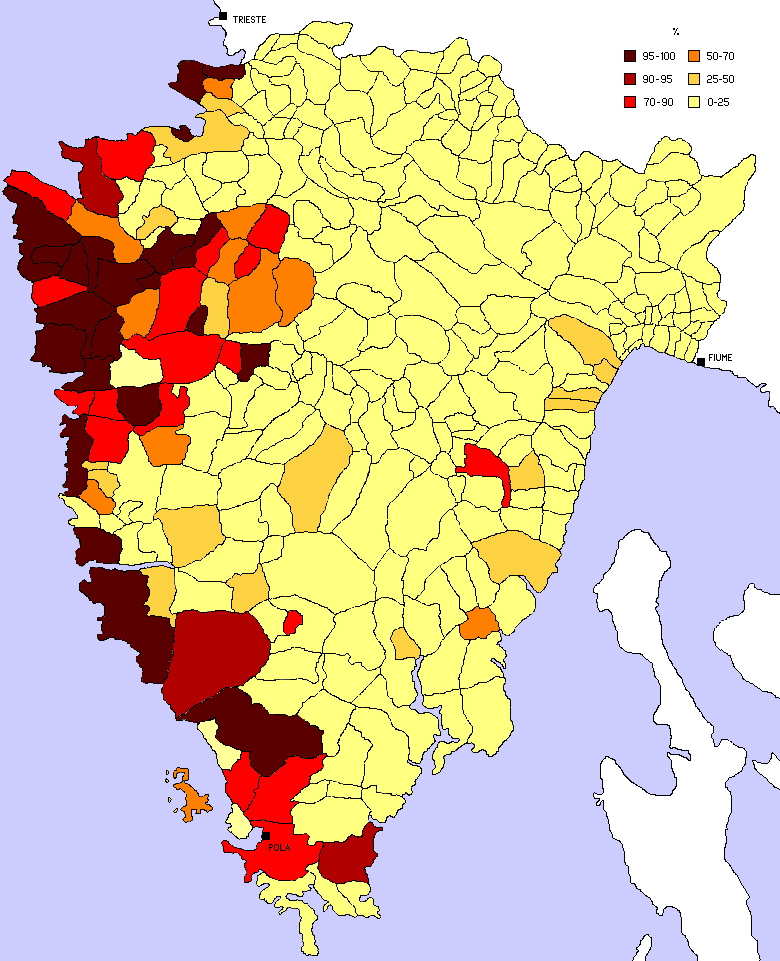
The Italian community in Istria (38%) was concentrated on its western coast. Croats formed the majority in the rest of the peninsula, with Slovenes in the north.

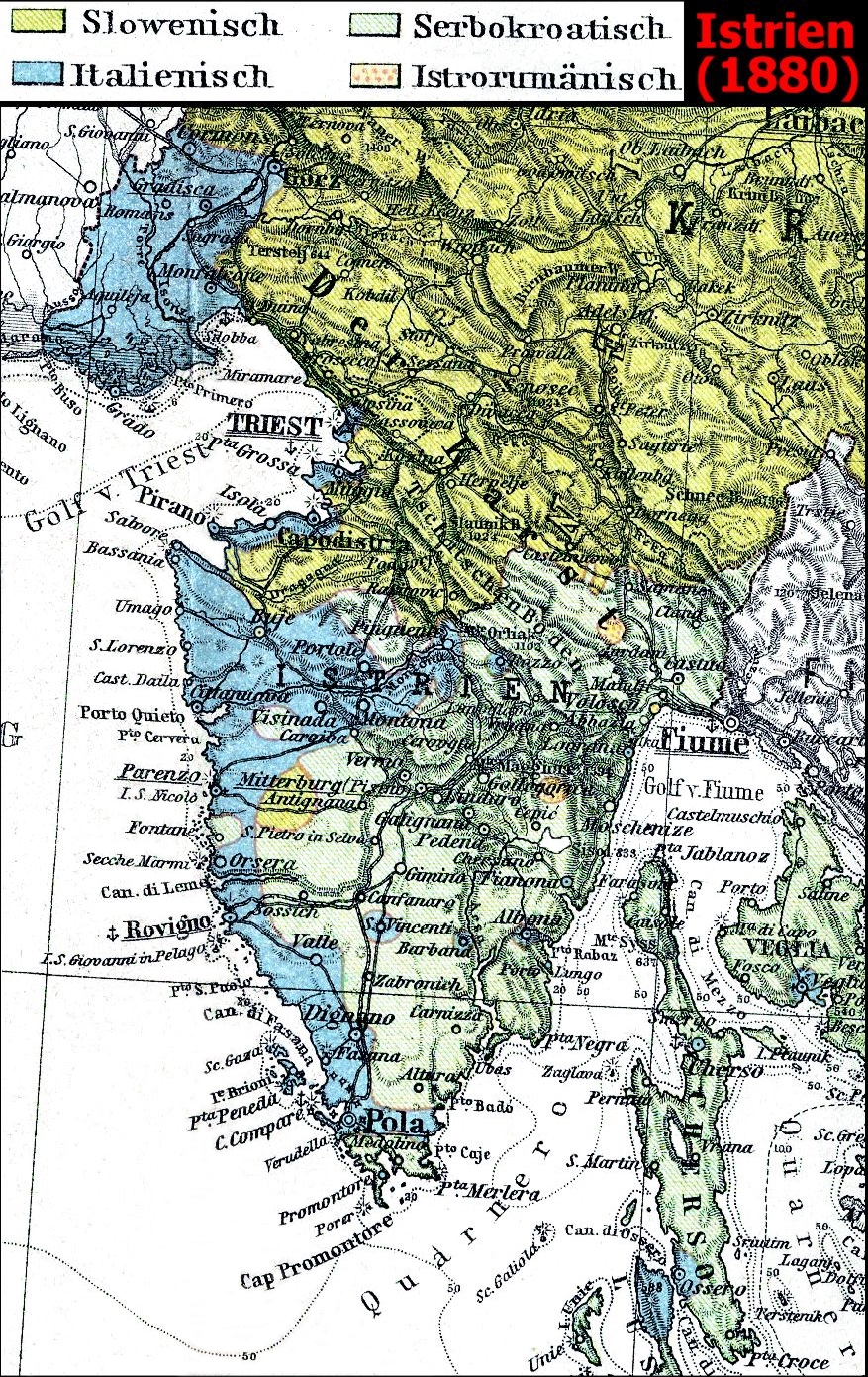
ethnically Croat-majority territory

Contemporary scholar Matteo Bartoli complained that these census percentages included areas outside Istria (like the island of Veglia/Krk and the city of Castua/Kastav, a mostly Croatian town situated north of Fiume and outside the real Istrian peninsula): in his opinion the peninsula of Istria was still with a majority of Italians during World War I.

In the second half of the 19th century, a clash of new ideological movements, Italian irredentism (which claimed Trieste and Istria) and Slovene and Croatian nationalism (developing individual identities in some quarters whilst seeking to unite in a South Slavic bid in others), resulted in growing ethnic conflict between Italians one side and Slovenes and Croats in opposition. This was intertwined with the class and religious conflict, as inhabitants of towns and western agricultural lands were mostly Italian, whilst Croats or Slovenes largely lived out in the countryside and elsewhere.

Capodistria/Koper was the center of Italian nationalism in Istria. In it, there was the main Comitato Istriano (Istrian Committee for Union to Italy), the meeting place of famous Istrian irredentists like Carlo Combi and Antonio Madonizza. From there, many Istrian italians went to fight for Venice against the Austrians in the Legione Istriano-dalmata.

After 1866, when Venice and the Veneto region were united to Italy, there was widespread support for unification of Istria with Italy as well. Tino Gavardo, Pio Riego Gambini and Nazario Sauro where the most renowned between those who promoted the Istrian unification to Italy. Many of them enrolled voluntarily in the Italian Army during World War I, fighting against the Austro-Hungarian Empire. Some, namely Nazario Sauro, were later captured, trialed for treason and executed.

In 1913 Pio Riego Gambini, Luigi Bilucaglia e Piero Almerigogna created the Fascio Giovanile Istriano.

After World War I, Istria became part of Italy under the Treaty of Rapallo. Some Istrian irredentists reached important positions within the Italian government, like Vittorio Italico Zupelli, who was appointed Minister after the war.

Italy's participation in World War II on the side of the Axis powers resulted in the 1947 Treaty of Paris, which transferred most of the territory annexed by Italy under the Treaty of Rapallo to Yugoslavia and provided for the right of option of nationality, and consequently the country in which people on both sides of the new border would live. The ensuing Istrian-Dalmatian exodus led to the emigration of between 230,000 and 350,000 of local ethnic Italians, choosing to maintain Italian citizenship.

There is a growing movement in Italy (and Europe) toward asking for the official recognition of "genocide" or even democide of the Italians in Istria.

== See also ==
- Italian irredentism
- Italian irredentism in Dalmatia

== Bibliography ==
- Alberi, Dario. Istria - Storia, arte, cultura. Lint Editoriale, Trieste, 1995. ISBN 88-8190-158-7.
- Bartoli, Matteo. Le parlate italiane della Venezia Giulia e della Dalmazia. Tipografia italo-orientale. Grottaferrata, 1919.
- Benussi, Bernardo. L' Istria nei suoi due millenni di storia. Treves-Zanichelli. Trieste, 1924.
- D'Alessio, Vanni. Il cuore conteso. Il nazionalismo in una comunità multietnica nell'Istria asburgica. Filema Edizioni, Napoli, 2003.
- Petacco, Arrigo. A tragedy revealed: the story of the Italian population of Istria, Dalmatia, and Venezia Giulia, 1943-1956. University of Toronto Press. Toronto, 2005. ISBN 0802039219.
- Pignatti Morano, Carlo. La vita di Nazario Sauro ed il martirio dell'eroe. Fratelli Treves Editori, Milano, 1922.
- Seton-Watson, Christopher (1967). Italy from Liberalism to Fascism, 1870–1925. Methuen & Co.
- Večerina, Duško. Talijanski Iredentizam (Italian Irredentism). ISBN 953-98456-0-2. Zagreb, 2001.
- Vignoli, Giulio. I territori italofoni non appartenenti alla Repubblica Italiana. Giuffrè Editoriale. Milano, 1995.
- Vivante, Angelo. Irredentismo adriatico. Venezia, 1984.
