= Democratic Fascist Party =

Democratic Fascist Party Partito Democratico Fascista
- President: Domenico Leccisi
- Founded: November 2, 1945
- Dissolved: December 27, 1946; 79 years ago
- Merged into: Italian Social Movement
- Headquarters: Milan
- Newspaper: Lotta Fascista
- Ideology: Neo-fascism; Revolutionary nationalism
- Political position: Far-right
- Colours: Black

The Democratic Fascist Party (in Italian Partito Democratico Fascista) was a clandestine Italian fascist political party. The party is known mainly because its founder and some other members stole the dead body of Benito Mussolini from the Cimitero Maggiore in Milan.

== History ==
The group, led by Domenico Leccisi (founder together with Mauro Rana and Antonio Parozzi), was part of that galaxy of neo-fascist groups formed in the aftermath of World War II: it chose this name in reference to the concept of organic democracy, conceived by Italian fascism and formalized during the Italian Social Republic (RSI), adopting as a symbol the bundle without the axe.

The information organ of the Democratic Fascist Party was Lotta Fascista, a clandestine paper considered the best of the period, among the neo-fascist clandestine newspapers, in terms of style, graphics and typographic quality.

=== The murders of the Volante Rossa ===
The murders of fascists in Milan, mainly by the communist "Volante Rossa" group, pushed the latter to regroup and begin to take the initiative and on November 5, 1945, the billboards of the Odeon cinema advertising the film Rome, Open City were set on fire. The action was claimed by the new Democratic Fascist Party of Domenico Leccisi. On 9 December 1946, fascist activist Brunilde Tanzi, former member of the Female Auxiliary Service and also a member of the Fascist Democratic Party, managed to replace a record during some advertising broadcasts with the fascist anthem Giovinezza on the entire Piazza del Duomo. On 17 January 1947 she was assassinated in Via San Protaso, in the center of Milan, and on the same day Eva Macciacchini, member of the neo-fascist group "Squadre d'Azione Mussolini", was also killed. The material authors of the murder of the two young women were never discovered, but the methods used were similar of those of the "Volante Rossa".

=== The theft of Mussolini's body ===
The group is mainly remembered because on 27/28 April 1946, on the anniversary of Mussolini's death, it stole the remains of Benito Mussolini's body from the Cimitero Maggiore di Milano, which had been buried there anonymously after his execution. Speaking of the action, Leccisi said:

"We went down into the pit and managed, holding one hand under the shoulders of the corpse, to pass a rope around his chest and another around his legs. When we raised him to his feet, his arms fell dangling and his head remained erect: the body assumed that characteristic position of attention that gave Mussolini, especially in public ceremonies, a martial and unmistakable appearance.»

The theft was publicly claimed by the groups in two letters, sent by Leccisi and his comrades, to the leftist newspapers Avanti! and l'Unità. On 7 May, the body was moved to the Angelicum Convent, thanks to the complicity of two Roman Catholic priests, that later moved it to the Certosa di Pavia.

On 3 July 1946 Leccisi and Antonio Perozzi, also a member of the party, were arrested by the Guards of Public Security Corps and charged with stealing Mussolini's body. On 12 August one of the priest who helped the group in the theft confessed his actions to the Guards and the dictator's body was recovered by the authorities.

=== End of the group ===
From May to September 1946, about twenty leaders and militants of the party, including Leccisi himself, were arrested by the Guards of Public Security and the Carabinieri, effectively dismantling the party; the remaining members disbanded the Democratic Fascist Party on 27 December 1946. The action of Leccisi, a relatively unknown young militant who acted without opinions or authorizations from the former hierarchs, was greeted with enthusiasm by the whole neo-fascist milieu.

== Sources ==
- Mario Giovana, Le nuove camicie nere, Edizioni dell'Albero, Turin, 1966.
- Mario Tedeschi, I Fascisti dopo Mussolini, Edizioni Arnia, Rome, 1950.
- Nicola Rao, La Fiamma e la Celtica, Sperling & Kupfer, Rome, 2006. ISBN 8820041936
- Enzo Antonio Cicchino e Roberto Olivo, Correva l'anno della vendetta, Mursia, 2013
