= Italian National Society =

The Italian National Society (Italian: Società Nazionale Italiana) was an Italian nationalist political organization created in 1857 by Daniele Manin and Giorgio Pallavicino. The National Society was created to promote and spread nationalism to political moderates in Piedmont and raised money, held public meetings, and produced newspapers. The National Society helped to establish a base for Italian nationalism amongst the educated middle class. By 1860, the National Society influenced dominant liberal circles in Italy and won over middle-class support for the union of Piedmont and Lombardy.

In 1857 Italian nationalists founded the monarchist-unionist Italian National Society, which supported the policies of Cavour. Under the presidency of Manin and the vice presidency of Garibaldi, the society achieved wider appeal than it would have achieved under the exclusive leadership of moderates.
