= Volante Rossa =

The organization officially known as Volante Rossa "Martiri Partigiani" (Red Quick-intervention [Team] "Partisan Martyrs"), often mentioned simply as Volante Rossa, was a clandestine antifascist paramilitary organization active in and around Milan in the postwar to the Second World War, from 1945 to 1949. Led by "tenente Alvaro" ("Lieutenant Alvaro"), nom-de-guerre of Giulio Paggio, it was made up of communist partisans and workers who aimed with their actions to build a continuity with the wartime action of the Italian Resistance.

== Origins and activities ==
The Volante Rossa had its roots in the organizational apparatus of the Gruppi di Azione Patriottica ("Groups of Patriotic Action", GAP), small-scale nuclei within the wartime Italian Resistance Movement which saw official action until 25 April 1945, and took its moniker from a section of the Stalinist-affiliated Brigate Garibaldi operating around Ossola, near the Alps: after the Allied High Command ordered the partisan formations to give up Republican Fascist prisoners, Paggio's men started murdering individuals identified as political adversaries.

After its foundation in Milan, the organization augmented its influence, relying on local networks and spreading as much as to cover much of Northern and Central Italy. It could rely on safehouses and alliances throughout all of Lombardy and Piedmont, in the so-called Emilian "triangle of death" and as far as Latium. It remained active for four years, until 1949. Its main headquarters were in the former Casa del Fascio in Lambrate (Milan), via Conte Rosso 12, which was transformed after April 25 into a People's House. This solution provided an unexpectedly useful cover and alibi for the continuous influx of persons.

=== The killings ===
The Volante Rossa performed murders of individuals it deemed representatives of the old régime. Its first action was the murder of two ausiliarie (female RSI soldiers), Rosa Bianchi Sciaccaluga and her daughter Liliana. Some of the victims, often kidnapped without a declared pretext, were murdered in Lambrate or at the Giuriati sports field whereas others were made to disappear in the Martesana and Villoresi canals, with a rock tied around their necks; later the rumor would purposely be spread that the victims had fled to Argentina.

The murders of former Fascists led the latter to close ranks and to start taking the initiative, and on 5 November 1945 the posters at Odeon movie theater publicizing Rossellini's film Roma città aperta were set on fire. The action was claimed by Domenico Leccisi's Partito Democratico Fascista (Democratic Fascist Party). On 17 January 1947 in via San Protaso, downtown Milan, the former Xth MAS Flotilla ausiliaria Brunilde Tanzi, also a member of the Partito Democratico Fascista was shot dead. Tilde had been responsible for switching a record during a radio advertisement, in order to play the banned Fascist anthem Giovinezza in Piazza del Duomo.

The authors of Tilde's murder were never discovered, but the modus operandi was that typical of the Volante Rossa. On the same day another ausiliaria was murdered, Eva Maciacchini, a member of the Squadre d'Azione Mussolini ("Mussolini" Shock Squads), whose body was found near Lambrate. Perhaps the most notorious of these murders was that of journalist Franco De Agazio, on 14 March 1947, which the Volante Rossa publicly claimed.

De Agazio was considered guilty in that he had taken part in the RSI and because the newspaper he was currently directing, the Meridiano d'Italia, he had published an investigation into the treasure of Dongo (a hoard of gold purportedly carried by Mussolini which was never recovered) skeptical of the "official" version of events. On 6 July 1947 a grenade was thrown into the house of Fascist Fulvio Mazzetti, but volantista Mario "Mila" Gandini was also hit by some shrapnel and, once wounded, was apprehended by police.

On 29 October 1947 an attempt was made to bomb the MSI headquarters in via Santa Radegonda and on November 4 Volante Rossa members broke into the house of General Ferruccio Gatti's, formerly Lieutenant-General of the Milizia Volontaria per la Sicurezza Nazionale, a recipient of the Medal of Military Valour, and indicated by L'Unità (the main Communist newspaper) as one of the leaders of the fledgling Neo-Fascist movements. The former Partisans opened fire on the General, killing him and heavily wounding his son Riccardo, as he attempted to protect his father.

On 27 January 1949 Felice Ghisalberti was murdered, a former member of the "Muti" Legion, who had taken part in many anti-partisan roundups and was now accused by the Volante Rossa of killing Eugenio Curiel. In fact, Ghisalberti had been tried and declared not guilty for this accusation on 4 June 1947. Later, a Volante Rossa member who found work in Ghisalberti's father's workshop justified the murder by alleging that Ghisalberti had often boasted publicly about killing partisans. The same day, Leonardo Masazza, a clerk with Siemens, was killed. On 10 February 1949 questore (police chief) Vincenzo Agnesina organized a large-scale roundup in Lambrate, which led to the arrest of 27 volantisti.

=== Relationship with the Italian Communist Party (PCI) ===
In October 1947 the Volante Rossa started its official contacts with the Italian Communist Party as well as openly performing supporting activities for the Party and the trade unions, especially during strikes and workers' protests, where it would perform security tasks and protect the protesters from law enforcement. The Volante Rossa also took part in the 28 November 1947 clashes, when the Communist Party broke into Milan's prefetto's office to protest the replacement of old prefetto Ettore Troilo.

During the Italian general election of 1948, the Volante Rossa performed security tasks for Communist candidates, but when Palmiro Togliatti came to Milan during his electoral tour, some sources state that he didn't let them approach him. The electoral defeat provoked a crisis between the Volante Rossa and the PCI, the latter progressively distancing itself from the former and later declaring its ignorance regarding the team's criminal activities. Nevertheless, the Volante Rossa's murders continued for nearly a year, and some members were tried for the double murder of Rosa Bianchi Sciaccaluga and her daughter Liliana, but without any final sentence.

== The Volante Rossa's trial ==
In 1949, after 27 Volante Rossa members were arrested, the group's activities ceased. The PCI disavowed the organization: its leaders were aided in fleeing beyond the "Iron Curtain", whereas many other members were abandoned to their fate. The trial took place in 1951 in Verona. The accused were 32, of whom 27 in captivity and 5 missing. The guilty sentences were 23, of which 4 to life in prison.

Eligio Trincheri, sentenced to life in prison, remained under arrest until 1971, when he was pardoned by President Giuseppe Saragat. The three leading organizers - Giulio Paggio, Paolo Finardi and Natale Buratto, sentenced to life in prison - were all helped in fleeing to Czechoslovakia and were finally all pardoned by President Sandro Pertini in 1978.

On 21 November 1953, at the Venice Court of Assize and Appeal, headed by judge Guido Pisani, the final verdict was pronounced: after six days of hearings, the members of the Volante Rossa group were found guilty of the following charges:

- conspiracy;
- possession of weapons;
- 16 June 1947: raid at the bar in Via Pacini, Milan;
- 29 October 1947: invasion and damages to the «Il Meridiano d'Italia» newspaper offices;
- 4 November 1947: murder of Ferruccio Gatti, in charge of the MSI Milan branch, and attempted murder on his wife, Margherita Bellingeri;
- 12 dicembre 1947: kidnapping (Italo Tofanello);
- 15 luglio 1948: occupazione of the «Bezzi» factory;
- 27 gennaio 1949: murder of Felice Ghisalberti;
- 27 gennaio 1949: murder of Leonardo Massaza.

== Members of the Volante Rossa ==
Some of the organization's members, with their nom-de-guerre between brackets, occupation and year of birth:

- Otello Alterchi (Otelin), electrician, born 1928;
- Felice Arnè (Mario), worker, born 1930;
- Giordano Biadigo (Tom), worker, born 1929;
- Bruno Bonasio, electrician, born 1926;
- Primo Borghini, janitor at the Lambrate People's House, born 1920;
- Mario Bosetti, born 1926;
- Natale Burato (Lino), mechanic, born 1928;
- Luigi Canepari (Pipa), mechanic, born 1925;
- Camillo Cassis, (Cassis), plumber, born 1925;
- Ennio Cattaneo, electrician, born 1930;
- Domenico Cavuoto (Menguc), bartender, born 1930;
- Giulio Cimpellin (Ciro), mechanic, born 1920;
- Ferdinando Clerici (Balilla), worker, born 1928;
- Luigi Comini (Luisott), photographer, born 1925;
- Walter Fasoli (Walter), jobless, born 1917;
- Paolo Finardi (Pastecca), born 1928;
- Mario Gandini (Milà);
- Pietro Jani (Jani), plumber, born 1926;
- Giacomo Lotteri (Loteri), mechanic, born 1920;
- Luigi Lo Salvio;
- Angelo Maria Magni, electrician, born 1926;
- Sante Marchesi (Santino), radiotechnician, born 1926;
- Antonio Minafra (Missaglia), born 1919;
- Mario Mondani, mechanic, born 1927;
- Giuseppe Morandotti (Morandoti), born 1927;
- Angelo Ostelli (Stuccafiss);
- Mauro Ostelli (Maurino); formerly in hiding in Czechoslovakia;
- Giulio Paggio (Alvaro), born 1925;
- Ettore Patrioli (Iaia), mechanic, born 1926;
- Carlo Reina, tanner, born 1926;
- Emilio Tosato (Lietù), electrician, born 1929;
- Ferruccio Tosi (Cazzo), electrician, born 1929;
- Eligio Trincheri (Marco), journalist, born 1925;
- Angelo Vecchio (Tarzan), worker, born 1925;
- Dante Vecchio (Tino), mechanic, born 1917;
- Walter Veneri (Walter), born 1927;
- Italo Zonato (Italo), mechanic, born 1925.

== See also ==
- Italian resistance movement
- Arditi del Popolo
