= Luigi Ziliotto =

Dalmatian Italian politician

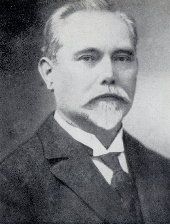

Personal details
- Born: 8 February 1863 Zara, Dalmatia, Austrian Empire (modern Zadar, Croatia)
- Died: 6 February 1922 (aged 58) Zara, Kingdom of Italy (modern Zadar, Croatia)
- Awards: Grand Officer of the Order of the Crown

Luigi Ziliotto (8 February 1863 – 6 February 1922) was a Dalmatian Italian politician and irredentist. Ziliotto was an Italian senator. He was podestà of Zara (Zadar) several times.

== Bibliography ==
- L.Monzali, Italiani di Dalmazia. Dal Risorgimento alla Grande Guerra, Le Lettere, Florence 2004
- L.Monzali, Italiani di Dalmazia. 1914–1924, Le Lettere, Florence 2007
- G.Soppelsa, Luigi Ziliotto, in F.Semi-V.Tacconi (cur.), Istria e Dalmazia. Uomini e tempi. Dalmazia, Del Bianco, Udine 1992
