= Italian nationalism =

Nationalism for Italy

Painting depicting the proclamation of the Kingdom of Italy in 1861

Italian nationalism (Italian: Nazionalismo italiano) is a movement which believes that the Italians are a nation with a single homogeneous identity, and therefrom seeks to promote the cultural unity of Italy as a country. From an Italian nationalist perspective, Italianness is defined as claiming cultural and ethnic descent from the Latins, an Italic tribe which originally dwelt in Latium and came to dominate the Italian Peninsula and much of Europe. Because of that, Italian nationalism has also historically adhered to imperialist theories.

Italian nationalism is often thought to trace its origins to the Renaissance, but only arose as a political force in the 1830s under the leadership of Giuseppe Mazzini. It served as a cause for Risorgimento in the 1860s to 1870s. Italian nationalism became strong again in World War I with Italian irredentist claims to territories held by Austria-Hungary, and during the era of Italian Fascism.

== History ==
=== Renaissance to 19th century ===
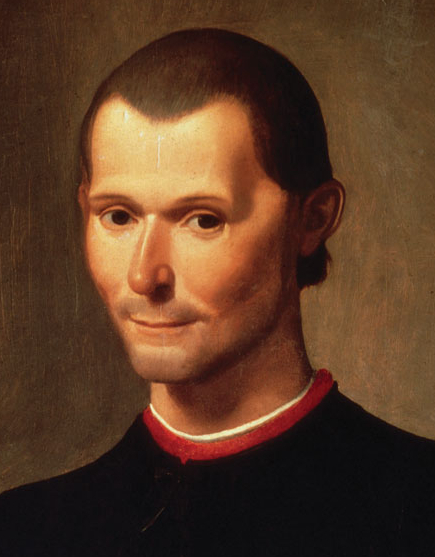
Niccolò Machiavelli, the founder of modern political science

The origins of Italian nationalism have been traced to the Renaissance where Italy led a European revival of classical Greco-Roman style of culture, philosophy, and art. Italian Nationalism first developed not among the general populace but among the intellectual elites of various Italian states. In 1344 Petrarch wrote the famous patriotic canzone “Italia mia” (Rime 128), in which he railed against the warring petty lords of Italy for having yielded the country up to barbarian German fury (ʻla tedesca rabbia’, line 35) and called for peace and unification. Around the same time, Cola di Rienzo attempted to unite the whole of Italy under the hegemony of Rome. In 1347 he assumed the title of “Libertatis, Pacis Iustitiaeque Tribunus, et Sacrae Romanae Rei Publicae Liberator.” Petrarch hailed him in his famous song “Spirto gentil che quelle membra reggi” as the reincarnation of the classical spirit.

In 1454, representatives from all the regional states of Italy met in Lodi to sign the treaty known as the peace of Lodi, by which they intended to pursue Italian unification. The status quo established at Lodi lasted until 1494, when French troops intruded into Italian affairs under Charles VIII, initiating the Italian Wars.

The Renaissance-era diplomat and political theorist Niccolò Machiavelli, in his work The Prince (1532), appealing to Italian patriotism urged Italians "to seize Italy and free her from the Barbarians", by which he referred to the foreign powers occupying the Italian peninsula. Machiavelli quoted four verses from Petrarch's “Italia mia”, which looked forward to a political leader who would unite Italy.

During the Italian Wars Pope Julius II (1503–1513) made every effort to forge Italian alliances to drive the enemy – in his time the French – out of the country. And although his rallying cry fuori i barbari (‘Put the barbarians out!’) is probably apocryphal, it very neatly sums up the feeling of many Italians. In his treatise Discorso sopra il concilio che si ha da fare, e sopra la unione d'Italia, published in 1566, Girolamo Muzio, a prominent man of letters of the mid-1500s, advocated for the first time the political unification of Italy.

In 1559 the Peace of Cateau-Cambrésis marked the end of Italian liberty and the beginning of a period of uncontested Spanish hegemony in Italy. During the long-lasting period of Spanish domination a vitriolic anti-Spanish polemic became widespread throughout Italy. Trajano Boccalini wrote many anti-Spanish pamphlets, such as Pietra del paragone politico (Politick Touchstone), published after his death in 1615. Followers of Boccalini published similar anti-Spanish pamphlets in the same period, such as Esequie delle reputazione di Spagna, printed in 1615, in which the corpse of the reputation of Spain is dissected by famous anatomists.

Modern historians disagree on the strength of “Italianità” (Italian national identity) in the early modern period. By contrast, Spanish diplomats in Italy at the time were all too certain that Italians shared a common bond of resentment against the imperial power of Spain.

Charles Emmanuel I's expansionist policy ignited Italian nationalism and patriotism. In 1614 Alessandro Tassoni published in quick succession two anonymous Filippiche addressed to the Italian nobility, exhorting the nobles to discard their lethargy, unite and instead of fighting each other, join Savoy in ridding Italy of Spanish hegemony.

At about the same time that Tassoni was inspired to write the Filippiche, Fulvio Testi, a young poet at the court of the duke of Este, published a collection of poems dedicated to Charles Emmanuel. Not all the poems were of a patriotic nature, but those that were clearly revealed the feelings Charles Emmanuel had stirred in freedom-loving Italians. Testi followed this up, in 1617, with the Pianto d'Italia, where Italy calls for a war of national independence, in which the Duke of Savoy is to be the leader.

More than fifty years later Vittorio Siri still reminisced that “all Italy broke forth with pen and tongue in praises and panegyrics at the name of Carlo Emanuele, and in demonstrations of joy and applause that he had revived . . . the ancient Latin valor, wishing that he . . . [might] one day become the redeemer of Italy's freedom and the restorer of its greatness.”

The failure of Charles Emmanuel's expansive foreign policy caused a widespread crisis among Italian nationalists.

In Vincenzo da Filicaja's late seventeenth-century sonnet “Italia, Italia O tu, cui feo la sorte” (Italy, Italy, O you, to whom fate has given) the 'unlucky gift of beauty' was the reason why Italy, 'the slave of friend and foe', had repeatedly been conquered, sacked and exploited throughout history. Filicaia's sonnet was well known, along with Petrarch's Italia mia, as one of the great Italian patriotic lyrics. It appeared in Sismondi's De la littérature du midi (where it is praised as 'the most celebrated specimen which the Italian literature of the seventeenth century affords') and was frequently translated into English.

In 1713 the Dukes of Savoy, who traditionally possessed the title of an imperial vicar of Italy, obtained royal dignity, securing their pre-eminence among the Italian princes.

When France started to annex Corsica in the late 18th century (and then incorporated during Napoleon's empire the regions of Piemonte, Liguria, Toscana and Lazio), the first movements to defend Italy's existence aroused with Paoli revolt and were later followed by the birth of the so-called "irredentism".

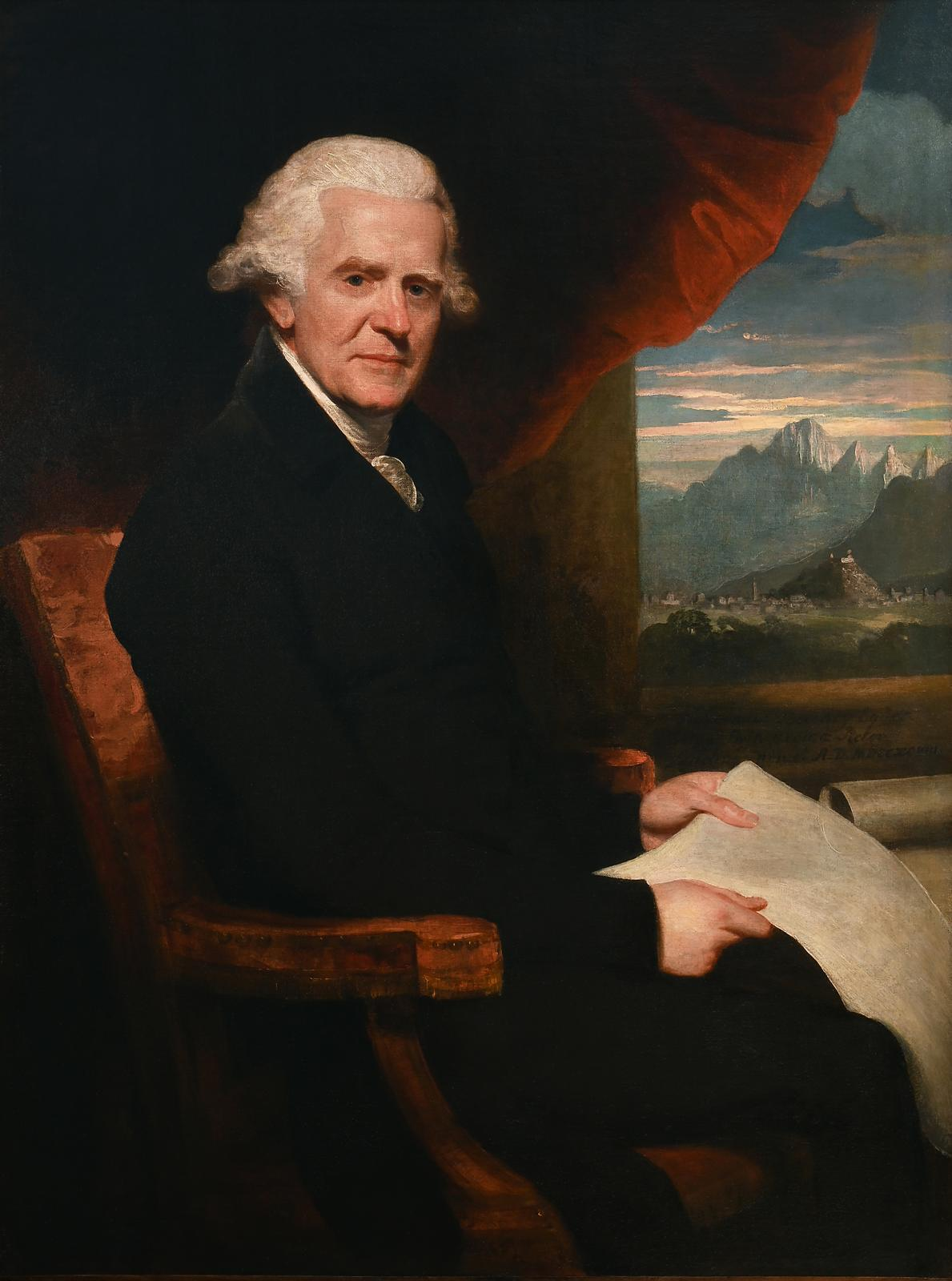
Pasquale Paoli, the Corsican hero who made Italian the official language of his Corsican Republic in 1755

Paoli was sympathetic to Italian culture and regarded his own native language as an Italian dialect (Corsican is an Italo-Dalmatian tongue closely related to Tuscan). He was considered by Niccolò Tommaseo, who collected his Lettere (Letters), as one of the precursors of the Italian irredentism. The so-called Babbu di a Patria ("Father of the fatherland"), as Pasquale Paoli was nicknamed by the Corsican Italians, wrote in his Letters the following appeal in 1768 against the French:

We are Corsicans by birth and sentiment, but first of all we feel Italian by language, origins, customs, traditions; and Italians are all brothers and united in the face of history and in the face of God ... As Corsicans we wish to be neither slaves nor "rebels" and as Italians we have the right to deal as equals with the other Italian brothers ... Either we shall be free or we shall be nothing... Either we shall win or we shall die, weapons in hand ... The war against France is right and holy as the name of God is holy and right, and here on our mountains will appear for Italy the sun of liberty....

=== 1830s to 1848 ===
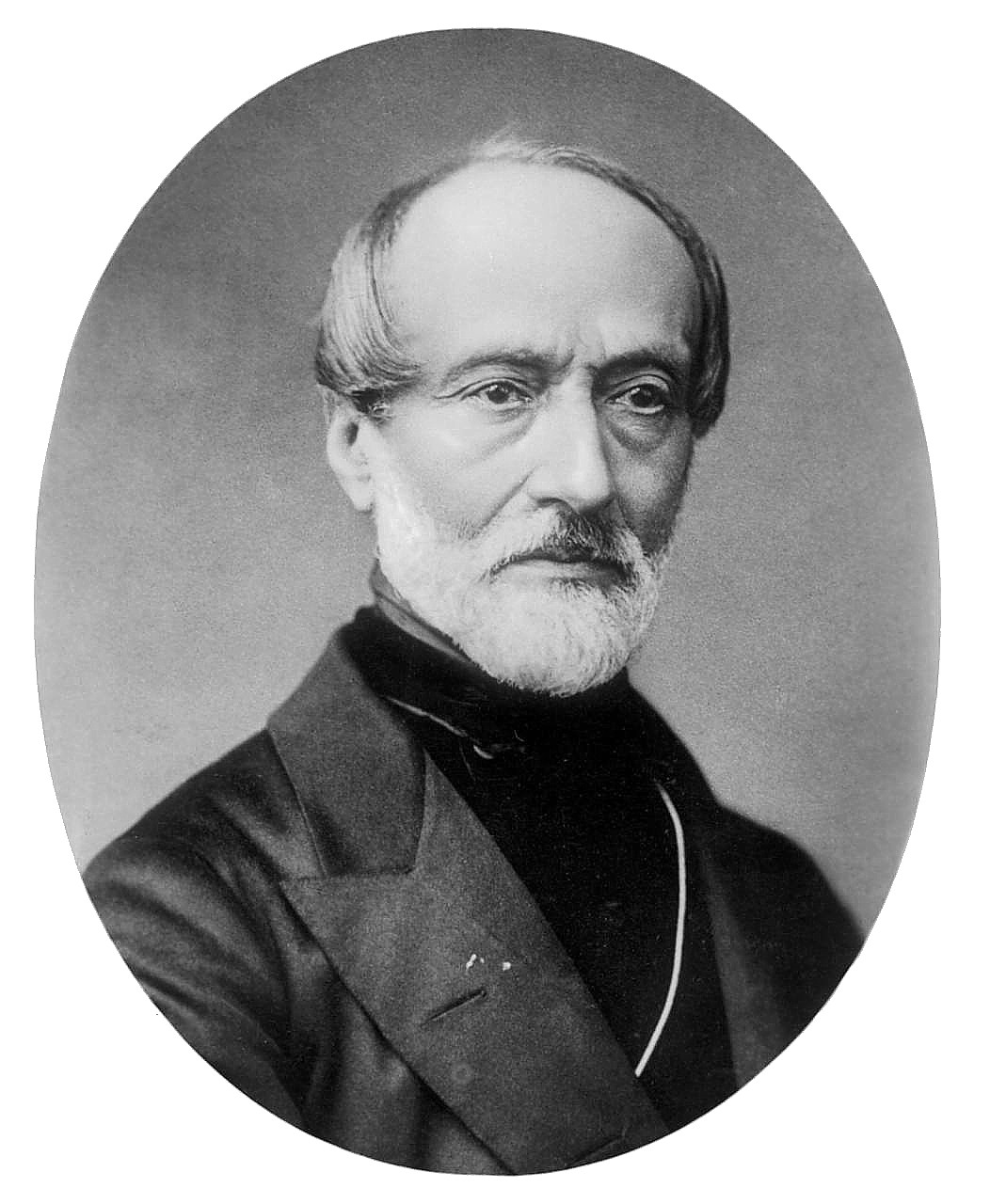
Giuseppe Mazzini. His thoughts influenced many politicians of a later period, among them Woodrow Wilson, David Lloyd George, Mahatma Gandhi, Golda Meir and Jawaharlal Nehru.

The initial important figure in the development of Italian nationalism was Giuseppe Mazzini, who became a nationalist in the 1820s. In his political career, Mazzini held as objectives the liberation of Italy from the Austrian occupation, indirect control by Austria, princely despotism, aristocratic privilege, and clerical authority. Mazzini was captivated by ancient Rome that he considered the "temple of humanity" and sought to establish a united Italy as a "Third Rome" that emphasized Roman spiritual values that Italian nationalists claimed were preserved by the Catholic Church. Mazzini and Italian nationalists in general promoted the concept of Romanità (the Romanness), which claimed that Roman culture made invaluable contributions to the Italian and Western civilization. Since the 1820s, Mazzini supported a revolution to create a utopia of an ideal Italian republic based in Rome. Mazzini formed revolutionary patriotic Young Italy society in 1832. Upon Young Italy breaking apart in the 1830s, Mazzini reconstituted it in 1839 with the intention to gain the support of workers' groups. However, at the time Mazzini was hostile to socialism due to his belief that all classes needed to be united in the cause of creating a united Italy rather than divided against each other.

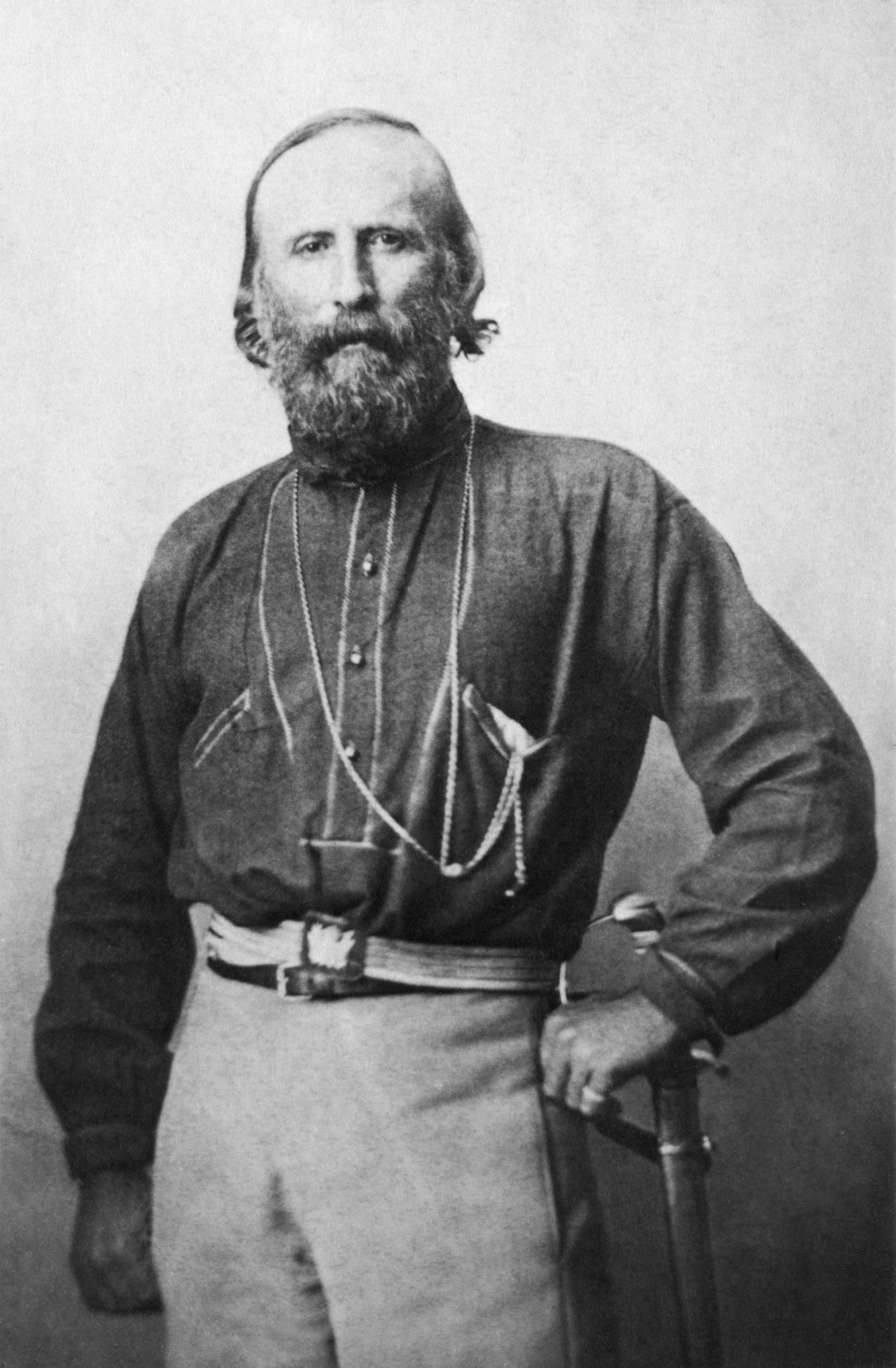
Giuseppe Garibaldi, celebrated as one of the greatest generals of modern times and as the "Hero of the Two Worlds" because of his military enterprises in South America and Europe, who fought in many military campaigns that led to Italian unification

Vincenzo Gioberti in 1843 in his book On the Civil and Moral Primacy of the Italians, advocated a federal state of Italy led by the Pope.

Camillo Benso, Count of Cavour, the future Prime Minister of the Kingdom of Sardinia and afterwards the Kingdom of Italy, worked as an editor for the nationalist Italian newspaper Il Risorgimento in the 1840s. Cavour was a clear example of civic nationalism with a high consideration for values including freedom, tolerance, equality, and individual rights compatible with a sober nationalism.

Economic nationalism influenced businessmen and government authorities to promote a united Italy. Prior to unification, tariff walls held between the Italian states and the disorganized railway system prevented economic development of the peninsula. Prior to the revolutions of 1848, Carlo Cattaneo advocated an economic federation of Italy.

=== Revolutions of 1848 to Risorgimento (1859 to 1870) ===
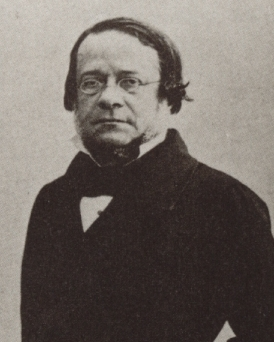
Daniele Manin, founder of the Italian National Society

Supporters of Italian nationalism ranged from across the political spectrum: it appealed to both conservatives and liberals. The Revolutions of 1848 resulted in a major development of the Italian nationalist movement. Liberalization of press laws in Piedmont allowed nationalist activity to flourish.

Following the Revolutions of 1848 and the liberalization of press laws, the Italian nationalist organization, called the Italian National Society, was created in 1857 by Daniele Manin and Giorgio Pallevicino. The National Society was created to promote and spread nationalism to political moderates in Piedmont and raised money, held public meetings, and produced newspapers. The National Society helped to establish a base for Italian nationalism amongst the educated middle class. By 1860, the National Society influenced dominant liberal circles in Italy and won over middle class support for the union of Piedmont and Lombardy.

The statesman Daniele Manin seems to have believed in Italian unification years before Camillo Benso of Cavour, who actually unified the country with Giuseppe Garibaldi through diplomatic and military actions. During the 1856 Congress of Paris, Manin talked with Cavour about several plans and strategies to achieve the unification of Italy; Cavour clearly considered those plans vain things, and after the meeting wrote that Manin had talked about "l'unità d'Italia ed altre corbellerie" ("the unity of Italy and other nonsense").

The Risorgimento was an ideological movement that helped incite the feelings of brotherhood and nationalism in the imagined Italian community, which called for the unification of Italy and the pushing out of foreign powers. Literature, music, and other outlets of expression frequently alluded back to the glorious past of Rome and the miraculous feats their ancestors had accomplished in defending their homeland and kicking out the foreign occupants.

=== Post-Risorgimento, World War I and aftermath (1870 to 1922) ===
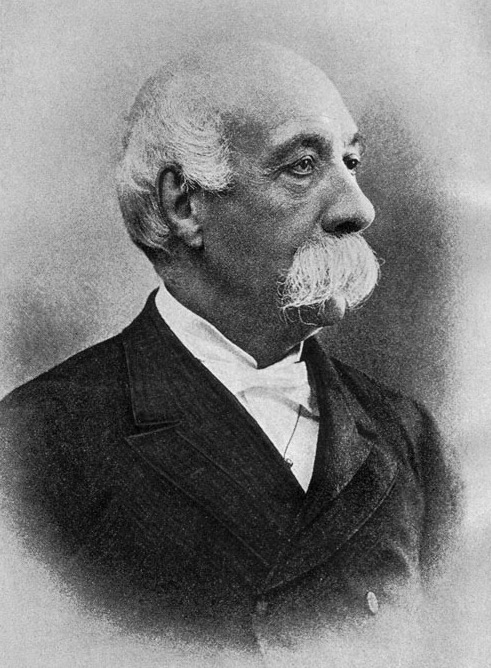
Francesco Crispi, whose actions as prime minister were characterised by a nationalism

After the unification of Italy was completed in 1870, the Italian government faced domestic political paralysis and internal tensions, resulting in it resorting to embarking on a colonial policy to divert the Italian public's attention from internal issues.

In these years, one of the most prominent political figures was Francesco Crispi, whose actions as prime minister were characterised by a nationalism that often appeared as a form of obsession for the national unity and defence from hostile foreign countries. Italy managed to colonize the East African coast of Eritrea and Somalia, but failed to conquer Ethiopia with 15,000 Italians dying in the war and being forced to retreat. Then, Italy waged war with the Ottoman Empire from 1911 to 1912 and gained Libya and the Dodecanese Islands from Turkey. However, these attempts to gain popular support from the public failed, and rebellions and violent protests became so intense that many observers believed that the young Kingdom of Italy would not survive.

Tired of the internal conflicts in Italy, a movement of bourgeois intellectuals led by Gabriele d'Annunzio, Gaetano Mosca, and Vilfredo Pareto declared war on the parliamentary system, and their position gained respect among Italians. D'Annunzio called upon young Italians to seek fulfillment in violent action and put an end to the politically maneuvering parliamentary government. The Italian Nationalist Association (ANI) was founded in Florence in 1910 by the jingoist nationalist Enrico Corradini who emphasized the need for martial heroism, of total sacrifice of individualism and equality to one's nation, the need of discipline and obedience in society, the grandeur and power of ancient Rome, and the need for people to live dangerously. Corradini's ANI's extremist appeals were enthusiastically supported by many Italians.

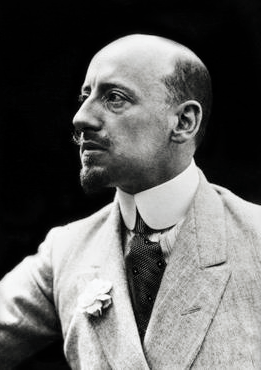
Gabriele d'Annunzio, as part of an Italian nationalist reaction against the Paris Peace Conference of 1919, set up the short-lived Italian Regency of Carnaro in Fiume (now Rijeka, Croatia).

At the outbreak of World War I in 1914, Italy initially maintained neutrality, despite its official alliance with Germany and Austria-Hungary since 1882 on the grounds that Germany and Austria-Hungary were waging an aggressive war that it refused to take part in. In 1915, Italy eventually decided to enter the war on the British and French side against Austria-Hungary and Germany.

Nationalist pride soared in Italy after the end of hostilities in November 1918, with the victory of Italy and Allied forces over Austria-Hungary and the seizure by Italy of former Austro-Hungarian territories. Italian nationalism became a major force at both elite and popular levels until 1945, when popular democracy became a much more important force.

Freemasonry was an influential semi-secret force in Italian politics with a strong presence among professionals and the middle class across Italy, as well as among the leadership in parliament, public administration, and the army. The two main organisation were the Grand Orient and the Grand Lodge of Italy. They had 25,000 members in 500 or more lodges. Freemasons took on the challenge of mobilizing the press, public opinion. and the leading political parties in support of Italy's joining the Allies. traditionally, Italian nationalism focused on unification, and undermining the power of the Catholic Church. In 1914-15 they dropped the traditional pacifistic rhetoric and used instead the powerful language of Italian nationalism. Freemasonry had always promoted cosmopolitan universal values, and by 1917 onwards they demanded a League of Nations to promote a new post-war universal order based upon the peaceful coexistence of independent and democratic nations.

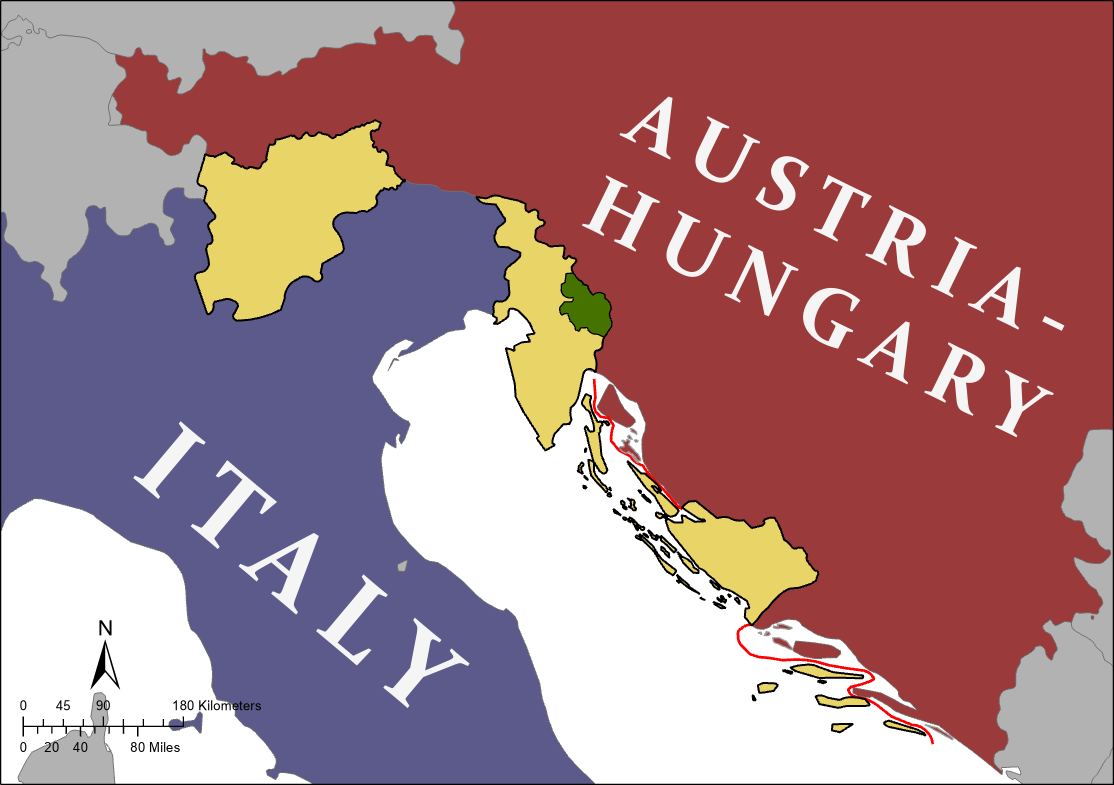
Territories promised to Italy by the secret Treaty of London (1915), i.e. Trentino-Alto Adige, the Julian March and Dalmatia (tan), and the Snežnik Plateau area (green). Dalmatia, after the WWI, however, was not assigned to Italy but to Yugoslavia.

Italy entered into World War I in 1915 with the aim of completing national unity, so it is also considered the Fourth Italian War of Independence, from a historiographical perspective, as the conclusion of the unification of Italy. Italy, nominally allied with German and the Austro-Hungarian empires in the Triple Alliance, in 1915 joined the Allies, entering World War I with a promise of substantial territorial gains that included west Inner Carniola, the former Austrian Littoral, and Dalmatia, as well as parts of the Ottoman Empire.The Treaty of Saint-Germain-en-Laye (1919) and Treaty of Rapallo (1920) allowed for annexation of Trentino Alto-Adige, the Julian March, Istria, the Kvarner Gulf and the Dalmatian city of Zara.

In particular, Italian nationalists were enraged by the Allies denying Italy the right to annex Fiume on the principle of self-determination, which they claimed by disregarding its mainly Slavic suburb of Sušak. Fiume was not included in Italy's demands agreed with the Allies in 1915, and a larger part of Dalmatia which had a vast majority Slavic population and an Italian minority (namely the Dalmatian Italians), claiming that Italian annexation of large part of Dalmatia would violate Woodrow Wilson's Fourteen Points. D'Annunzio responded to this by mobilizing two thousand veterans of the war who seized Fiume by force; this action was met with international condemnation of d'Annunzio's actions but was supported by a majority of Italians. Though d'Annunzio's government in Fiume was forced from power, Italy annexed Fiume a few years later.

Since Italy did not receive other territories promised by the Treaty of London, so this outcome was denounced as a "mutilated victory", by Benito Mussolini, which helped lead to the rise of Italian fascism. Historians regard "mutilated victory" as a "political myth", used by fascists to fuel Italian imperialism.

=== Fascism and World War II (1922 to 1945) ===
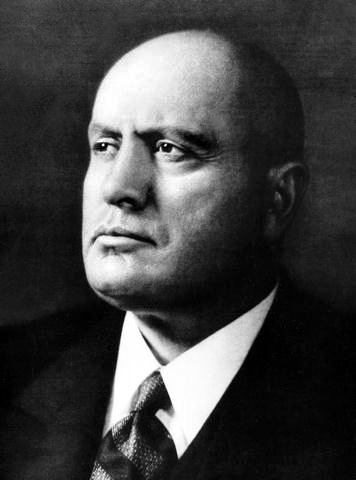
The fascist dictator Benito Mussolini titled himself Duce and ruled the country from 1922 to 1943.

The seizure of power by the Italian Fascist leader Benito Mussolini as Prime Minister of Italy in 1922 and his development of a fascist totalitarian state in Italy involved appeal to Italian nationalism, seeking to expand Italian possessions via irredentist claims based on the legacy of the Roman and Venetian empires. For this reason the fascists engaged in interventionist foreign policy. In 1935, Mussolini invaded Ethiopia and founded Italian East Africa, resulting in international isolation and leading to Italy's withdrawal from the League of Nations. Italy then allied with Nazi Germany and the Empire of Japan, and strongly supported Francisco Franco in the Spanish Civil War. In 1939, Italy annexed Albania.

There were three major themes in Mussolini's foreign policy. The first was a continuation of the foreign-policy objectives of the preceding Liberal regime. Liberal Italy had allied itself with Germany and Austria, and had great ambitions in the Balkans and North Africa. Ever since it had been badly defeated in Ethiopia in 1896, there was a strong demand for seizing that country. Second was a profound disillusionment after the heavy losses of the First World War; the small territorial gains from Austria were not enough to compensate. Third was Mussolini's promise to restore the pride and glory of the Roman Empire.

Italian Fascism is based upon Italian nationalism and in particular, seeks to complete what it considers as the incomplete project of Risorgimento by incorporating Italia Irredenta (unredeemed Italy) into the state of Italy. To the east of Italy, the Fascists claimed that Dalmatia was a land of Italian culture. To the south, the Fascists claimed Malta, which belonged to the United Kingdom, and Corfu, which belonged to Greece, to the north claimed Italian Switzerland, while to the west claimed Corsica, Nice and Savoy, which belonged to France. Mussolini sought to build closer relations with Germany and the United Kingdom while showing hostility towards France and Yugoslavia. He fought communism in Spain in 1936/37 and united Albania to the Kingdom of Italy in 1939. In 1940, Mussolini entered WW2 on the side of Hitler's Germany, but in September 1943, Italy was forced to surrender to the Allies.

After World War II, Italian irredentism disappeared along with the defeated Fascists and the Monarchy of the House of Savoy. After the Treaty of Paris (1947) and the Treaty of Osimo (1975), all territorial claims were abandoned by the Italian Republic (see Foreign relations of Italy). The Italian irredentist movement thus vanished from Italian politics.

=== Post–World War II and current situation ===
After the fall of Fascism and following the birth of the Republic, the interest in Italian nationalism by scholars, politicians and the masses was relatively low, mainly because of its close relation with Fascism and consequently with bad memories of World War II. The only notable and active political party who clearly declared Italian nationalism as its main ideology was the neo-fascist Italian Social Movement (MSI), which became the fourth largest party in Italy by the early 1960s. In these years, Italian nationalism was considered an ideology linked to right-wing political parties and organisations. Nevertheless, two significant events seemed to revitalise Italian nationalism among Italians, the first one in 1953 with the Question of Trieste when the claim of Italy on the full control of the city of Trieste was largely endorsed by most of the Italian society with patriotic demonstrations.

In 1995 the MSI developed in the Alleanza Nazionale and was in the Berlusconi governments of Italy: the party was part of all three House of Freedoms coalition governments led by Silvio Berlusconi. Gianfranco Fini (leader of Alleanza Nazionale) was nominated Deputy Prime Minister after the 2001 general election.

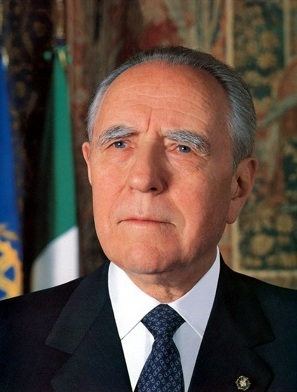
Carlo Azeglio Ciampi

In the 2000s, Italian nationalism seemed to gain a moderate support by the society, in particular during important days such as the National Day Festa della Repubblica (Republic day) and the Anniversary of the Liberation. The President of the Republic Carlo Azeglio Ciampi has often praised patriotism among Italians by mentioning in his speeches national events, including the Risorgimento or the Resistenza, and national symbols like the Flag of Italy and the National Anthem, although he seems to want to stress self-confidence rather than plain nationalism. Nationalist ideologies are often present during Italian anti-globalisation protests. Today, Italian nationalism is still mainly supported by right-wing political parties like Brothers of Italy and minor far-right political parties like The Right, CasaPound, Forza Nuova and Tricolour Flame. Nonetheless, in recent times Italian nationalism has been occasionally embraced as a form of banal nationalism by liberal parties like Forza Italia, centrist parties like the Union of the Centre or even by centre-left parties like the Democratic Party.

Italian nationalism has also faced a great deal of opposition from within Italy itself. Regionalism and municipal identities have challenged the concept of a unified Italian identity, like those in Friuli-Venezia Giulia, Naples, Sardinia, Sicily and Veneto. Such regional identities evoked strong opposition after the Piedmontese-led unification of Italy to plans for "Piedmontization" of Italy. Italian identity has also been long strained by an ever growing north–south divide that developed partly from the economic differences of a highly industrialized North and a highly agricultural South.

== Symbols ==
Civil flag of Italy, originally designed in 1797. A symbol of the Italian nation since the early-19th century and symbol of the Italian Republic since 1946.

Civil flag of the Kingdom of Italy from 1861 to 1946. Presently used by Italian monarchists.

War flag of the Italian Social Republic, the incarnation of Fascist Italy from 1943 to 1945 after the Fascist regime in the Kingdom of Italy was dismantled in 1943. It is a prominent symbol used by Italian neo-fascists.

== Italian nationalist parties ==
=== Current major party ===
- Brothers of Italy (2012–present)
- Lega (2017–present)
- National Future (2026–present)

=== Current minor parties ===
- Fascism and Freedom Movement (1991–present)
- Tricolour Flame (1995–present)
- Unitalia (1996–present)
- National Front (1997–present)
- New Force (1997–present)
- New Italian Social Movement (2000–present)
- CasaPound (2003–present)
- Social Idea Movement (2004–present)
- Social Right (2013–present)
- United Right (2014–present)

=== Former ===
- Action Party (1848–1867)
- Italian Nationalist Association (1910–1923)
- Fascio Rivoluzionario d'Azione Internazionalista (1914)
- Fasci d'Azione Rivoluzionaria (1915–1919)
- Futurist Political Party (1918–1920)
- Fasci Italiani di Combattimento (1919–1921)
- National Fascist Party (1921–1943)
- Republican Fascist Party (1943–1945)
- Democratic Fascist Party (1945–1946)
- Italian Movement of Social Unity (1946)
- Italian Social Movement (1946–1995)
- Alleanza Nazionale (1995-2009)
- National Front (1967–1970)
- National Front (1990–2000)
- The Right (2007–2017)
- National Movement for Sovereignty (2017–2019)

== Personalities ==
- Gabriele D'Annunzio
- Benito Mussolini
- Enrico Corradini
- Francesco Crispi
- Giorgio Almirante
- Giuseppe Garibaldi
- Roberto Fiore
- Massimo Morsello
- Stefano Delle Chiaie
- Giuseppe Mazzini

== See also ==
- Nationalism (Italy)
- Italian Empire
- History of Italy
- Italian culture
- Italian Fascism
- Italian irredentism
- Italian unification
- Italians
- Revolutions of 1848
