= Italian irredentism in Dalmatia =

Italian political and nationalist movement

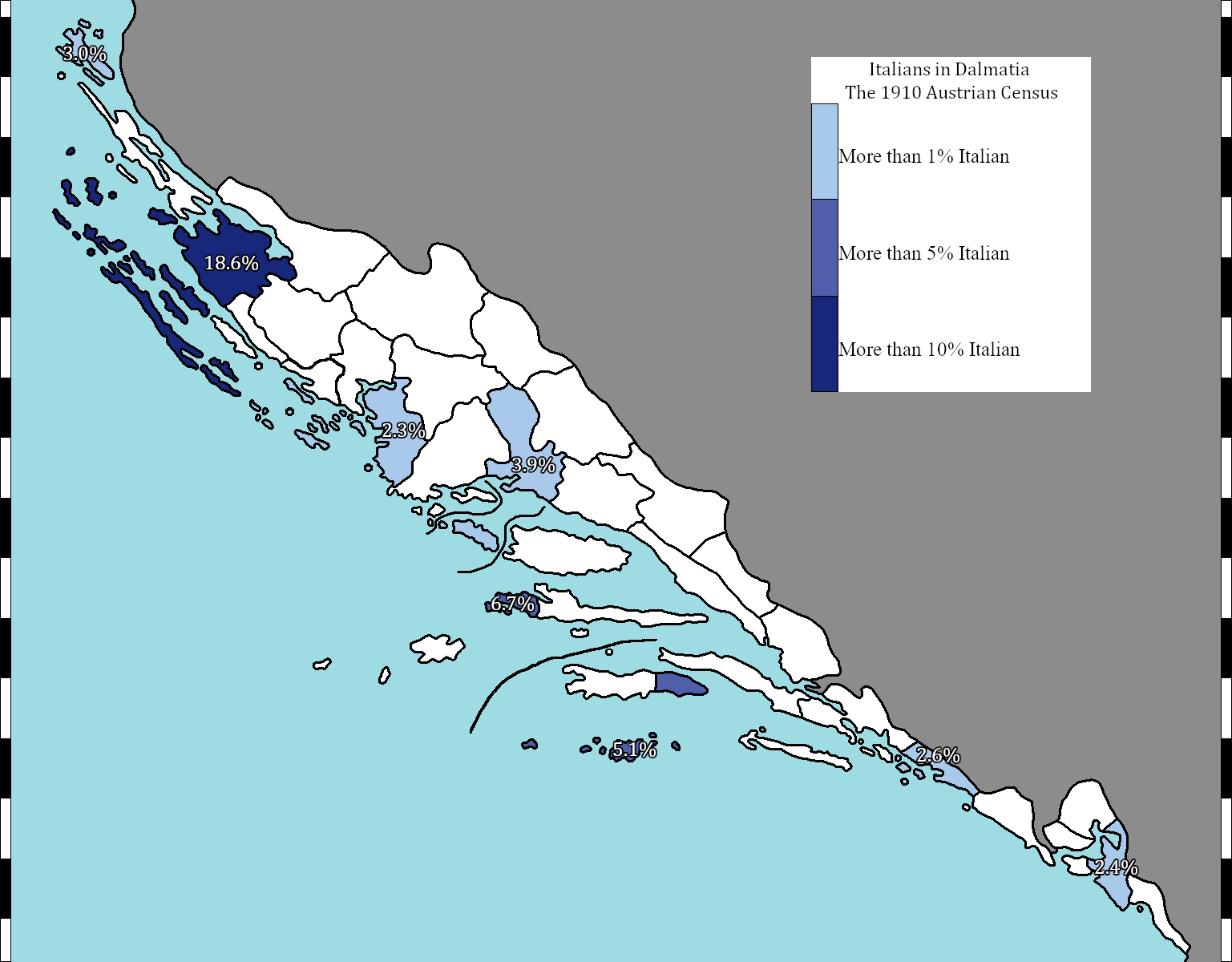
Proportion of Dalmatian Italians in districts of Dalmatia in 1910, per the Austro-Hungarian census

Italian irredentism in Dalmatia was the political movement supporting the unification to Italy, during the 19th and 20th centuries, of Adriatic Dalmatia.

== History ==
=== 19th century ===
The Republic of Venice, between the 9th century and 1797, extended its dominion to Istria, the islands of Kvarner and Dalmatia, when it was conquered by Napoleon. Dalmatia was then aggregated to the Napoleonic Kingdom of Italy in 1805, and annexed to the Illyrian Provinces in 1809 (for some years also the Republic of Ragusa was included, since 1808).

After the fall of Napoleon (1814) Istria, the islands of Kvarner and Dalmatia were annexed to the Austrian Empire. From the Middle Ages to the 19th century, Italian and Slavic communities in Istria and Dalmatia had lived peacefully side by side because they did not know the national identification, given that they generically defined themselves as "Istrians" and "Dalmatians", of "Romance" or "Slavic" culture. Later, many Istrian Italians and Dalmatian Italians looked with sympathy towards the Risorgimento movement that fought for the unification of Italy. The first events that involved the Dalmatian Italians in the unification of Italy were the revolutions of 1848, during which they took part in the constitution of the Republic of San Marco in Venice. The most notable Dalmatian Italians exponents who intervened were Niccolò Tommaseo and Federico Seismit-Doda.

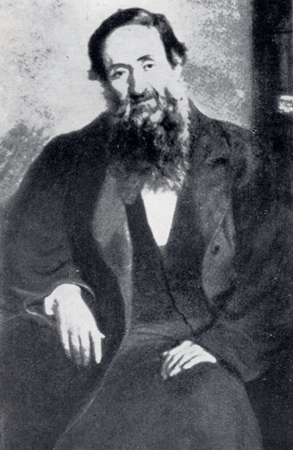
Niccolò Tommaseo

After the Third Italian War of Independence (1866), when the Veneto and Friuli regions were ceded by the Austrians to the newly formed Kingdom Italy, Istria and Dalmatia remained part of the Austro-Hungarian Empire, together with other Italian-speaking areas on the eastern Adriatic. This triggered the gradual rise of Italian irredentism among many Italians in Istria, Kvarner and Dalmatia, who demanded the unification of the Julian March, Kvarner and Dalmatia with Italy.

Before 1859, Italian was the language of administration, education, the press, and the Austrian navy; people who wished to acquire higher social standing and separate from the Slav peasantry became Italians. In the years after 1866, Italians lost their privileges in Austria-Hungary, their assimilation of the Slavs came to an end, and they found themselves under growing pressure from other rising nations; with the rising Slav tide after 1890, italianized Slavs reverted to being Croats.

Austrian rulers found use of the racial antagonism and financed Slav schools and promoted Croatian as the official language, and many Italians chose voluntary exile. During the meeting of the Council of Ministers on 12 November 1866, Emperor Franz Joseph I of Austria outlined a wide-ranging project aimed at the Germanization or Slavization of the areas of the empire with an Italian presence:

His Majesty expressed the precise order that action be taken decisively against the influence of the Italian elements still present in some regions of the Crown and, appropriately occupying the posts of public, judicial, masters employees as well as with the influence of the press, work in South Tyrol, Dalmatia and Littoral for the Germanization and Slavization of these territories according to the circumstances, with energy and without any regard. His Majesty calls the central offices to the strong duty to proceed in this way to what has been established.

— Franz Joseph I of Austria, Council of the Crown of 12 November 1866

With the development of Croatian nationalism, critics such as Croatian historian Duško Večerina alleged that these evaluations were not conducted by modern scientific standards and that they took spoken language as the criterion, rather than blood, origin and ethnicity. They pointed out that according to a report by Imperial court councillor Joseph Fölch in 1827, the Italian language was spoken by noblemen and some citizens of middle and lower classes exclusively in the coastal cities of Zadar, Šibenik and Split. Since only around 20,000 people populated these towns and not all were Italian speakers, they claim that the real number was rather smaller, probably around seven percent of the total population, as is asserted by the Department of Historical Studies of the Croatian Academy of Sciences and Arts (HAZU).

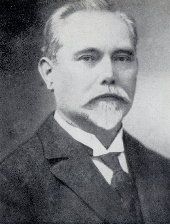
Luigi Ziliotto

Italian irredentists like Gabriele D'Annunzio, as well as prominent Italian scholars like Angelo Vivante, alleged that Fölch did not include the Dalmatian islands of Cres (Cherso), Lošinj (Lussino), Krk (Veglia), Vis (Lissa), Hvar (Lesina), Korcula (Curzola) and many other islands with significant Italian communities. They reasserted that the only official evidence about the Dalmatian population comes from the 1857 Austro-Hungarian census, which showed that in this year there were 369,310 indigenous Croatians and 45,000 Italians in Dalmatia, making Dalmatian Italians 10.8 percent of the total population of Dalmatia in the mid-19th century.

Two nationalist movements were born in Dalmatia, the Italian and the Slav. The political instances of the Dalmatian Italians were promoted to the Autonomist Party, founded in 1878 and dissolved in 1915: a prominent member was Antonio Bajamonti, who from 1860 to 1880 was mayor of Split. The party, which originally also had the favour of part of the Slavic population, gradually replaced an autonomous program for the region with an irredentist project for the region, given the hostility of the Austrian authorities and the disagreements with the Slavic element.

In 1889, the foundation of the Dante Alighieri Society, with the aim of protecting and promoting the Italian language, made it possible to give support to the initiatives for the preservation of the Italian-speaking linguistic element. In this period Roberto Ghiglianovich, as trustee of the company establishes the La Lega in Zadar and promoted the enhancement of Italian culture in the area. The same year the irredentist Luigi Ziliotto becomes mayor of Zara, a position he would hold until the outbreak of World War I, was accused of treason and declared forfeited by the Austrian authorities. The policy of collaboration with the local Serbs, inaugurated by Roberto Ghiglianovich and by Giovanni Avoscani, then allowed the Italians to conquer the municipal administration of Dubrovnik in 1899.

The Italian population in Dalmatia was concentrated in the major coastal cities. In the city of Split in 1890 there were 1,971 Dalmatian Italians (9% of the population), in Zadar 7,672 (27%), in Šibenik 1,090 (5%), in Kotor 646 (12%) and in Dubrovnik 356 (3%). In other Dalmatian localities, according to Austrian censuses, Italians experienced a sudden decrease: in the twenty years 1890-1910, in Rab they went from 225 to 151, in Vis from 352 to 92, in Pag from 787 to 23, completely disappearing in almost all inland locations.

=== 20th century ===
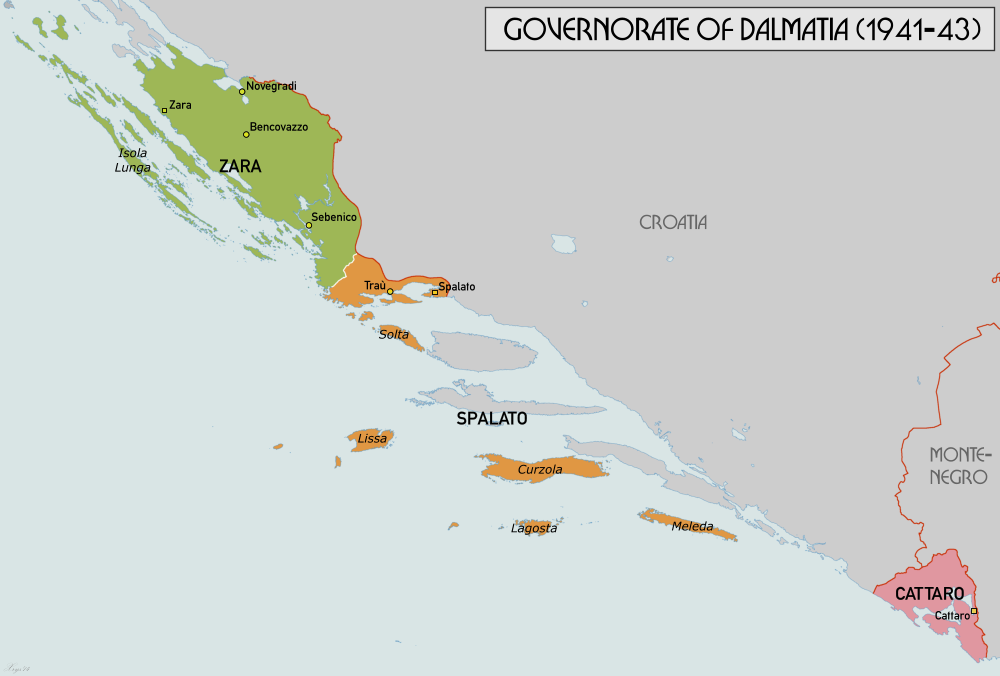
Detailed map of the three Italian provinces of the Governorate of Dalmatia: province of Zara, province of Spalato and province of Cattaro

In 1909, the Italian language lost its status as the official language of Dalmatia in favour of Croatian only (previously both languages were recognized), thus Italian could no longer be used in the public and administrative sphere.

For the Austrian Kingdom of Dalmatia (Dalmatia), the 1910 numbers were 96.2 percent Slavic speakers and 2.8 percent Italian speakers, recording a drastic decline in the number of Dalmatian Italians, who in 1845 amounted to 20 percent of the total population of Dalmatia. Another evidence about the Dalmatian population comes from the 1857 Austro-Hungarian census, which showed that in this year there were 369,310 indigenous Croatians and 45,000 Italians in Dalmatia, making Dalmatian Italians 10.8 percent of the total population of Dalmatia in the mid-19th century.

Dalmatia was a strategic region during World War I that both Italy and Serbia intended to seize from Austria-Hungary. Italy joined the Triple Entente Allies in 1915 upon agreeing to the London Pact that guaranteed Italy the right to annex a large portion of Dalmatia in exchange for Italy's participation on the Allied side. In November 1918, after the surrender of Austria-Hungary, Italy occupied militarily Trentino Alto-Adige, the Julian March, Istria, the Kvarner Gulf and Dalmatia, all Austro-Hungarian territories. On the Dalmatian coast, Italy established the Governorate of Dalmatia, which had the provisional aim of ferrying the territory towards full integration into the Kingdom of Italy, progressively importing national legislation in place of the previous one. In 1918, Admiral Enrico Millo declared himself Italy's Governor of Dalmatia. The administrative capital was Zara. The Governorate of Dalmatia was evacuated following the Italo-Yugoslav agreements which resulted in the Treaty of Rapallo (1920). Italian nationalist Gabriele d'Annunzio supported the seizure of Dalmatia, and proceeded to occupy some areas in an Italian warship in December 1918.

The last city with a significant Italian presence in Dalmatia was the city of Zara (Zadar). In the Austro-Hungarian census of 1910, the City of Zara had a population of 36,595, out of which 11,552 were Italians (31.6%). In 1921, the population dropped to 18,623, with 12,283 Italians (66%). In 1941, during World War II, Yugoslavia was occupied by Italy and Germany. Dalmatia was divided between Italy, which constituted the Governorate of Dalmatia, and the Independent State of Croatia, which annexed Dubrovnik and Morlachia. After the Italian surrender on 8 September 1943, the Independent State of Croatia annexed the Governorate of Dalmatia, except for the territories that had been Italian before the start of the conflict, such as Zara.

In 1943, Josip Broz Tito informed the Allies that Zara was a chief logistic centre for German forces in Yugoslavia. By overstating its importance, he persuaded them of its military significance. Italy surrendered in September 1943 and over the following year, specifically between 2 November 1943 and 31 October 1944, Allied Forces bombarded the town 54 times. Nearly 2,000 people were buried beneath rubble; 10–12,000 people escaped and took refuge in Trieste and just over 1,000 people reached Apulia. Tito's partisans entered the city on 31 October 1944, and 138 people were killed.

With the 1947 Peace Treaty and its right of option provision, Dalmatian Italians still living in Zadar and in Dalmatia became part of the Italian exodus. Only about 500 people declare themselves Italian now in Dalmatia. In particular, according to the official Croatian census of 2011, there are 83 Dalmatian Italians in Split (equal to 0.05% of the total population), 16 in Šibenik (0.03%) and 27 in Dubrovnik (0.06%). According to the official Croatian census of 2021, there are 63 Dalmatian Italians in Zadar (equal to 0.09% of the total population). According to the official Montenegrin census of 2011, there are 31 Italians in Kotor (equal to 0.14% of the total population).

== See also ==
- Italian irredentism in Istria
- Governorate of Dalmatia

== Bibliography ==
- Bartoli, Matteo. Le parlate italiane della Venezia Giulia e della Dalmazia. Tipografia italo-orientale. Grottaferrata, 1919.
- Barzilai, Salvatose. L'irredentismo: ecco il nemico! Editore Il Circolo Garibaldi, 1890. Harvard University, 2002.
- Lovrovici, Giovanni Eleuterio. Zara dai bombardamenti all'esodo (1943–1947). Tipografia Santa Lucia - Marino. Roma, 1974.
- Monzali, Vitale. The Italians of Dalmatia: from Italian unification to World War I. University of Toronto Press. Toronto, 2009. ISBN 0802096212.
- Petacco, Arrigo. A tragedy revealed: the story of Italians from Istria, Dalmatia, Venezia Giulia (1943–1953). University of Toronto Press. Toronto, 1998.
- Rodogno, Davide. Fascism's European empire: Italian occupation during the Second World War. Publisher Cambridge University Press. Cambridge, 2006. ISBN 0521845157.
- Tommaseo, Niccolo. La questione dalmatica riguardata ne'suoi nuovi aspetti: osservazioni. (Tipografia Fratelli Battara, 1861). Harvard University Press. Harvard, 2007.
- Večerina, Duško. Talijanski Iredentizam. Zagreb, 2001. ISBN 953-98456-0-2.
- Vignoli, Giulio. I territori italofoni non appartenenti alla Repubblica Italiana. Giuffrè Editoriale. Milano, 1995.
- Vivante, Angelo. Irredentismo adriatico. Venezia, 1984.
