= Fascism and Freedom Movement =

Fascism and Freedom Movement Movimento Fascismo e Libertà
- Abbreviation: MFL–PSN
- Secretary: Carlo Gariglio
- Founder: Giorgio Pisanò
- Founded: July 25, 1991; 35 years ago
- Split from: Italian Social Movement
- Headquarters: Strada del Cavallero, 4 San Paolo Solbrito
- Newspaper: Il Lavoro Fascista
- Membership (2014): 1,500
- Ideology: Fascism; Anti-Zionism; Third Position; Social Credit
- Political position: Far-right

Website
- www.fascismoeliberta.it

The Fascism and Freedom Movement – National Socialist Party (Italian: Movimento Fascismo e Libertà – Partito Socialista Nazionale, MFL–PSN), or simply Fascism and Freedom Movement, is an Italian fascist political party formed on 25 July 1991 by Giorgio Pisanò.

== History ==
Fascism and Freedom Movement was founded in 1989 as a political movement inside the Italian Social Movement, centered around Senator Giorgio Pisanò and his weekly Candido. Finally, it separated from the MSI on 25 July 1991. In 2009, it added the words National Socialist Party (NSP) to its original name. The movement has been sued several times for alleged reconstitution of the dissolved National Fascist Party. It refuses agreements and / or alliances with other neo-fascist parties, stressing categorically not to be classified as a right-wing party, and that similar parties do not sufficiently adhere to Fascist ideology. The party makes explicit reference to the ideals of the Italian Social Republic as corporatism and the nationalization of the economy. Their ideology is based on the thought of fascist leader Benito Mussolini, and has as its main objective the realization of Mussolini's strongly hierarchical corporate democracy based on social credit. The party is also in favor of a presidential republic, and expresses a strong sense of anti-Americanism and anti-Zionism.

It is the only recognised party in Italy with the inscription "Fascismo" on its logo. Overall, it is an ultranationalist party with tendencies towards the Third Position and anti-capitalism.

== Congresses ==
- I National Congress – Prato, 1 March 1998
- II National Congress – Trieste, 10 October 1999
- III National Congress – Torino, 2 December 2001
- IV National Congress – Torino, 29 October 2006
- V National Congress – Villanova d'Asti, 6 November 2011
- VI Congresso Nazionale - Villanova d'Asti, 30 ottobre 2016
- VII Congresso Nazionale - San Paolo Solbrito, 5 giugno 2022

== Leadership ==
Secretary

- Giorgio Pisanò (1991–1997)
- Giuseppe Martorana (1998–2001)
- Carlo Gariglio (2001–present)
