= Domenico Leccisi =

Italian politician (1920–2008)

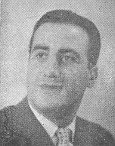
- Leccisi in 1958
- Born: 20 May 1920; Molfetta, Kingdom of Italy
- Died: 2 November 2008 (aged 88); Milan, Italy
- Known for: Stealing the remains of Benito Mussolini
- Political party: Italian Social Movement
- Movement: Neo-Fascism

Domenico Leccisi (20 May 1920 – 2 November 2008) was an Italian politician, who is best known for stealing the corpse of the fascist dictator Benito Mussolini from an unmarked grave in 1946.

== Grave robbing incident ==
On the eve of the first anniversary of Italy's liberation from Nazi occupying forces, Leccisi, then a right-wing journalist, and two helpers dug up the corpse from the city's Musocco cemetery and spirited it away.

Leccisi left behind a note that said: "Finally, O Duce, you are with us. We will cover you with roses but the smell of your virtue will overpower those roses."

Authorities discovered Mussolini's remains four months later, hidden at a 15th-century monastery at Pavia south of Milan. Two monks were charged with hiding the body.

In 1957 Mussolini found a final resting place at his birthplace in Predappio, northern Italy, after a campaign led by Leccisi and his party.

== Political career ==
Leccisi served as a parliamentary deputy for the neo-fascist Italian Social Movement from 1953 to 1963. He was also a Milan city councillor and wrote an autobiography, With Mussolini Before and After Piazzale Loreto.

== Death ==
Leccisi died at age 88 on 2 November 2008 at a retirement home in Milan due to heart and respiratory disease.
