= Paravia =

Paravia may refer to:

- Pier Alessandro Paravia (1797-1857), Venetian writer, scholar, philanthropist and professor of Italian eloquence
- Santa Paravia en Fiumaccio, a video game in which each player becomes the ruler of a fledgling Italian city-state in 1400
