= Francesco Carrara =

Francesco Carrara may refer to:

- Francesco I da Carrara (1325–1393)
- Francesco Carrara (Cardinal), Camerlengo of the Sacred College of Cardinals 1790–1791
- Francesco Carrara (jurist) (1805–1888), Italian jurist
- Francesco Carrara (archaeologist) (1812–1854), Italian archaeologist
