= Antonio Cippico =

Dalmatian Italian politician

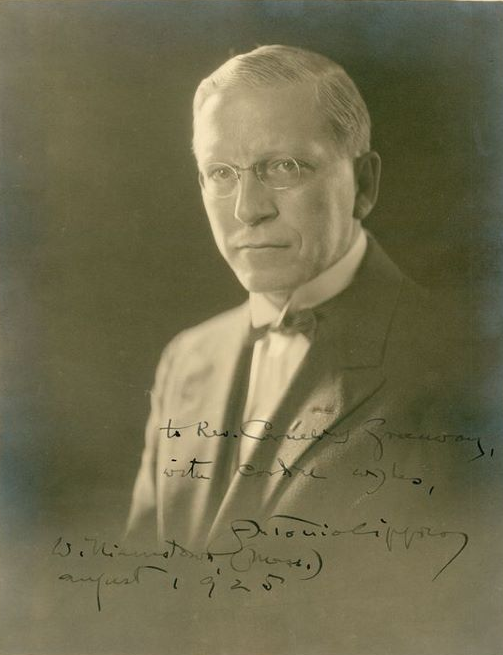

Senator of the Kingdom of Italy
- In office 31 May 1923 – 17 January 1935

Personal details
- Born: 20 March 1877 Zara, Kingdom of Dalmatia, Austria-Hungary (Today Zadar, Croatia)
- Died: 17 January 1935 (aged 57) Rome, Italy
- Awards: Grand Officer of the Order of the Crown; War Merit Cross

Antonio Cippico (20 March 1877 – 17 January 1935) was a Dalmatian Italian politician, translator, and irredentist. Cippico was an Italian senator. He translated Shakespeare and Nietzsche into Italian, and the Oresteia together with Tito Marrone.

He was an Italian born in Zara, Dalmatia, and was for many years Professor of Italian Literature at the University of London. Cippico was appointed senator by Benito Mussolini. He was also a delegate to the League of Nations Assembly. Cippico, who died in 1935, was a supporter of Italian fascism in its beginnings. Cippico was also an Italian irredentist. He wrote for the Giornale d'Italia ("The Newspaper of Italy"), publishing a series of articles about Italian interests in the Adriatic, and made fierce attacks on the so-called "neutralists", whom he scornfully called "Germanophiles". In the end of 1914 he co-founded in Rome the society Pro Dalmazia italiana ("In favor of an Italian Dalmatia").
