= Carlo Viola =

Dalmatian Italian geologist

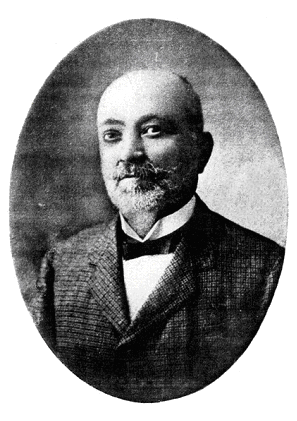
- Portrait of Carlo Maria Viola
- Born: Carlo Maria Viola; 11 February 1855; Zara, Dalmatia, Austrian Empire
- Died: 8 April 1925 (aged 70); Bologna, Italy
- Occupations: Geology, mineralogy, crystallography, physics, mathematics

Carlo Viola (2 November 1855 – 4 August 1925) was a Dalmatian Italian geologist.

== Biography ==
He was born in Zara, Austrian Empire (now Zadar, Croatia) on 2 November 1855. The identity of his parents is unknown. It is known, however, that his father was originally from Fiume (Rijeka), and a captain in the Navy, and that his mother was Venetian.

He was educated in his native Dalmatia, in Istria and in Graz. He enrolled at the University of Vienna, where he met Guglielmo Oberdan, who at the time was a prominent figure among Italian students. He later fled Austria together with Oberdan and other Italian irredentists, and was able to see again his family only when Zara (Zadar) was annexed to Italy, in the aftermath of the Treaty of Rapallo.

He came back to Italy, where he made important studies in the field of geology. He contributed to the creation of the Carta geologica d'Italia, although he made yet more fundamental contributions in the fields of crystallography, mathematics and physics, publishing such books as Contributo alla geologia del Gargano, in Bollettino del Reale Comitato geologico d’Italia (1893), Il calcolo dei quaternioni in cristallografia (1893), Le roccie eruttive della Punta delle Pietre Nere in provincia di Foggia (1894), Über Homogenität, in Zettschr. f. Krystall (1898), Grundzüge der Krystallographie (1904), Determinazione di tre indici principali di rifrazione in una sezione qualsiasi (1912).

In 1900 he became Engineer in Chief in Iglesias (Sardinia), and the director of the local mining school. In 1905 he became professor at the University of Parma, teaching mineralogy. He spent his summers in Germany, studying crystallography with Victor Goldschmidt and Paul Heinrich von Groth. In 1902 he joined the Mineralogical Society of Great Britain and Ireland.

He studied geology in Rome and Berlin (Bergakademie). At this time he made several excursions in Thuringia, in the Harz and in the area around Berlin. He also studied pedology in the newly established laboratory in Berlin.

He later promoted the annexation of Fiume (Rijeka) and Zara (Zadar) to Italy, dedicating his work to it. He died in Bologna on 4 August 1925.

== Legacy ==
Today there are several streets named after him in Italy. In Rome there is a square named after him (Largo Carlo Maria Viola).

== Sources ==
- Fonti e Bibl.: M. Ferrari, L’ing. prof. C.M. V., in Bollettino del Regio Ufficio geologico d’Italia, LI (1926), pp. 1–15;
- D. Brianta - L. Laureti, Cartografia, scienza di governo e territorio nell’Italia liberale, Milano 2006;
- D. Brianta, Europa mineraria: circolazione delle élites e trasferimento tecnologico, secoli XVIII-XIX, Milano 2007.
