= Riccardo Forster =

- Born: 1869; Zara, Kingdom of Dalmatia, Austria-Hungary (today Zadar, Croatia)
- Died: 1939 (aged 69–70); Naples, Kingdom of Italy

Riccardo Forster (1869–1939) was a Dalmatian Italian poet, journalist and critic.

== Biography ==
As a young man, Forster was an exponent of the Julian-Dalmatian irredentists, and for this reason persecuted by the Austrians. He moved to Naples with the help of Gabriele D'Annunzio and Edoardo Scarfoglio. He began to collaborate with Il Mattino as a theater critic.

He founded and directed the cultural magazine, Flegrea, from 1899 to 1901. From the beginning, he sided with fascism, and in 1925 at the behest of Benito Mussolini, became the director of the newspaper. Forster held this position until 1928.

In 1905 he published a book of poems: La fiorita, consisting of sonnets with a neo-romantic and late-scapigliato style. He also wrote a one-act drama, Revelations, and short novellas inspired by D'Annunzio that were published in the magazines of the day.

== Sources ==
- Francesco Bruno, Dentro Napoli, Alfredo Guida Editori, Napoli, 2004 ISBN 88-7188-807-3
- Matteo D'Ambrosio, Nuove verità crudeli: origini e primi sviluppi del futurismo a Napoli, Alfredo Guida Editori, Napoli, 1990
- Necrol. La morte di R. F. In silenzio (articoli di L.A. Procida e A. Vesce), in Il Mattino, 20 dic. 1938;
- I. Tacconi, R. F., in Riv. dalmatica, XIX (1938), 4, p. 54; T. Rovito, Diz. dei letterati e giornalisti ital. contemporanei, Napoli 1907, p. 104;
- F. Barbagallo, Il Mattino degli Scarfoglio, Milano 1979, pp. 70, 115, 208, 210;
- G. Infusino, La storia del Mattino, Napoli 1982, pp. 113, 167, 179, 291;
- E. Giammattei, D'Annunzio giornalista a Napoli. I segni del contesto, in D'Annunzio giornalista. Atti del V Convegno internazionale di studi dannunziani, Pescara 1983, pp. 37–39;
- R. Gisotti, La nascita della terza pagina. Letterati e giornalismo 1860–1914, Lecce 1986, p. 53.
