= Furio Lauri =

Dalmatian Italian aviator

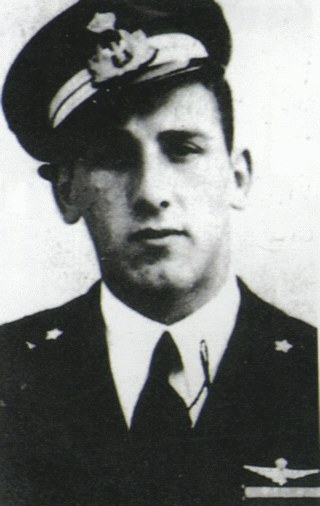
- Born: 11 October 1918; Zara, Dalmatia, Austria-Hungary
- Died: 2 October 2002 (aged 83); Rome, Italy
- Military career
- Allegiance: Kingdom of Italy
- Branch: Regia Aeronautica
- Service years: 1939–1947
- Awards: Gold Medal of Military Valour; Silver Medal of Military Valor; Silver Medal of Military Valor; War Cross of Military Valor

Furio Lauri (12 February 1915 – 2 October 2002) was a Dalmatian Italian aviator, Italian Air Force officer and pilot during World War II, who was awarded several medals for his rescue missions. He fought on the fronts of Italy, Libya and Tunisia.

== Biography ==
Enlisted in the Regia Aeronautica in 1939, at the beginning of the Second World War he was assigned to the 368th Squadron of the 151st Autonomous Group CT with which he fought on the fronts of Italy, Libya and Tunisia, achieving 11 kills, mainly aboard a Fiat G.50 Freccia. After 8 September 1943 he took part in the clashes with the Germans at Porta San Paolo, then he continued to fly among the ranks of the Italian Co-belligerent Air Force, flying a Fieseler Fi 156 Storch that transported personnel across the front line. Among these rescue actions, the one that took place in April 1945 is best remembered. On this occasion, Lauri rescued two wounded from the secret mission Operation Tombola, organized by the British 2 SAS and by the Italian and Russian partisans against the command of the Western Gothic Line located in Botteghe d'Albinea (province of Reggio Emilia). English captain Micheal Lees (SOE) and Lieutenant Glauco "Gordon" Monducci (head of the Black Owl partisan team connected to the English mission), wounded during the March 27 attack on the German headquarters located in Villa Rossi, were saved by a group of British partisans and SAS and then transported beyond the enemy lines by the action of Lauri who picked them up in the Parma Apennines with a reckless landing and take-off.

Lauri was awarded a gold medal for military valor for his actions. He later graduated in law and became a lawyer, and after the war he founded two companies active in aeronautical construction. After his death in 2002, the exhibition hall of the Ronchi dei Legionari Airport was named after him.

The episode of the attack on the command of the Western Gothic Line, of the rescue of Lees and Monducci thanks to the courageous action of Lauri and of their re-embracing after half a century is narrated in the book The sterling bracelet (Il bracciale di sterline) by Matteo Incerti and Valentina Ruozi (2011).

Lauri's Storch with which he saved Lees and Monducci is on display at the Italian Air Force Museum, located on the former Vigna di Valle Air Base in Bracciano near Rome.

== Awards ==
He was awarded with several medals, including two Silver Medals of Military Valor and the Gold Medal of Military Valour.
