= Giorgio Politeo =

Dalmatian Italian philosopher

- Giorgio Politeo at the Liceo Marco Foscarini of Venice in 1882
- Born: April 15, 1827; Split, Kingdom of Dalmatia, Austrian Empire
- Died: December 26, 1913 (aged 86); Venice, Kingdom of Italy
- Citizenship: Italian
- Occupation(s): Philosopher, educator

Giorgio Politeo (15 April 1827 – 26 December 1913) was a Dalmatian Italian philosopher and educator. He is said to have elaborated "a form of intuitionism based on Indian mysticism."

== Biography ==
He was born in Split, Kingdom of Dalmatia (present-day Croatia) on 15 April 1827. He attended the seminary in his city of birth. Said seminary also served as a high school for non-seminarians, under the name of Ginnasio Liceo Imperiale in Spalato; where Ugo Foscolo, who Politeo admired, had also studied. He came from an old and esteemed Split family, but a financial setback forced him to seek employment as a substitute teacher in the same seminary / high school, thus having to continue his studies as an autodidact.

Between 1850 and 1852 he was a substitute teacher of Latin, history and geography in Split.

He graduated from the University of Vienna in 1852, and the following year published the important essay Delle opinioni del Gioberti sull'Orlando Furioso.

In 1854 he was a substitute for the chair of universal and Austrian history at the University of Padua, where he associated with the group of Dalmatian students and teachers who used to meet at the house of Countess Cattani Borelli of Vrana. While waiting for a planned appointment at an Austrian university, he obtained a temporary post at the Liceo / Convitto di Santa Caterina in Venice (since 1867 Liceo Ginnasio Marco Foscarini). He was soon recalled in Vienna because he was suspicious to the Austrian authorities. Called back to Vienna, he waited in vain for almost three years (1857-1859) for the promised university chair and finally was sent again to the Liceo Santa Caterina in Venice.

After being accused again, he was sent to teach in Mantua, as a punishment. He taught Italian literature and history in Mantua.

Here he resumed his studies, and in particular his work on his essay Storia dell'Ideale Umano, of which he finished and published the introduction in 1862, with the title Genesi naturale di un'idea.

Following the wars of independence, the province of Mantua and the Veneto were annexed to the Kingdom of Italy and in 1867 Politeo returned to teach in Venice; first at the Liceo Marco Polo and finally again at the Liceo Foscarini, in 1870, and at the Paolo Sarpi technical institute. In 1870 he married a young Mantuan girl, Maria Guadagni. In 1873 the couple had a daughter who died prematurely at the age of five.

In the following years Politeo worked continuously on his work, showing more and more a trait of very strong self-criticism that led him to destroy several times the texts already completed: because of this commitment he refused the offer of a candidacy to Parliament. At the insistence of Luigi Luzzatti in 1879 he took part in the competition for the chair of moral philosophy at the University of Padua, eventually not getting the position.

He had a great influence on Alfredo Panzini, among others.

He died in Venice on 25 December 1913.

== Bibliography ==
- Giorgio Politeo. Scritti filosofici e letterari, con introduzione di Luigi Luzzatti, Bologna, Zanichelli, 1919.
- Giovanni Bordiga, Giorgio Politeo - Commemorazione, Venezia, 1927.
- A. Faggi, Per un filosofo dalmata, Marzocco, 1920.
- Giovanni Gentile, Giorgio Politeo in Critica, 20 novembre 1919.
- A. Renda, Un pensatore dalmata in Nuovo Convito, novembre 1919.
- F. Tacconi, Un filosofo dalmata in Rivista dalmatica, gennaio 1926.
- Ildebrando Tacconi, Giorgio Politeo, in Istria e Dalmazia. Uomini e Tempi. Dalmazia, Udine, Del Bianco, 1992.
- Erminio Troilo, Un filosofo dalmata in Bilychnis, novembre 1927.
