= Camerlengo =

Italian title of medieval origin

Camerlengo (plural: camerlenghi, Italian for "chamberlain") is an Italian title of medieval origin. It derives from the late Latin camarlingus, in turn coming through the Frankish kamerling, from the Latin camerarius which meant "chamber officer" (generally meaning "treasure chamber").

== Description ==
Camerlengo has been used in the papal court for the following official positions:

- Camerlengo of the Holy Roman Church, in the Vatican, senior administrator for the Holy See
- Camerlengo of the Sacred College of Cardinals, lapsed 1997
- Camerlengo of the Roman Clergy

Some other positions in the papal court were formerly termed papal chamberlains. Although usually given as an honorary award, the position involved some duties. Laity receiving this honor are now called Papal Gentlemen, while clergy are typically appointed as a "Chaplain of His Holiness", a form of monsignor.

== See also ==
- Kamerlengo Castle (Croatia)
