= Francesco Carrara (archaeologist) =

Dalmatian Italian archaeologist

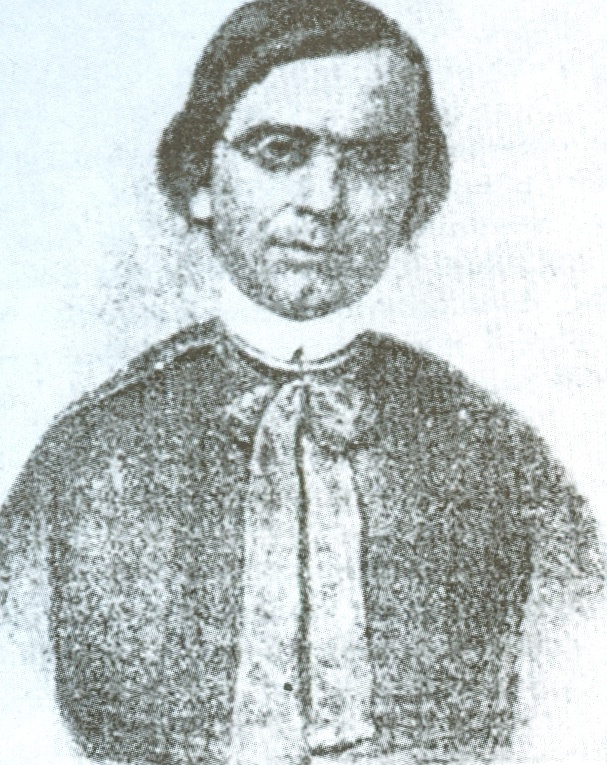
- Born: 16 November 1812; Spalato, Austrian Empire
- Died: 29 January 1854 (aged 41)
- Occupation: Archaeologist

Francesco Carrara (16 November 1812 – 29 January 1854) was a Dalmatian Italian archaeologist.

== Biography ==
Carrara was born in Dalmatia, in Spalato (today Split, Croatia), into a well-to-do family. His father died when he was 19 years old. He joined the seminary, where he studied grammar, philosophy and rhetoric. He carried on his studies of theology at the central seminary in Zara against the wishes of his father, who wanted him to run the family business. He was then sent to study in Vienna, at the Augustinian Institute, where he completed his studies and celebrated his first mass. The latter was celebrated in the private chapel of monsignor L. Altieri, who had taken him under his wing.

His first publication, entitled Piombo unico inedito attribuito a Teodora figlia di Giovanni Ducas moglie di Michele VIII Paleologo was about a piece in the collection of the Altieri princes.

In 1842, he was called to the chair of history and religion at the Seminary of Spalato, but not having received permission to examine the archive of the Metropolitan Chapter of the city, after a short stay in Padua for a degree in theology he decided to return to Vienna (1840) believing to be able to discover findings of the historical events of Dalmatia's past.

In the State Archives of the Austrian capital, Carrara found over 250 documents relating to the period from 1078 and 1694. However, he aroused some envy in the restricted circle of researchers, which was also due to his brusque style and sharp judgments.

He became curator of the Museum of Spalato and obtained a government grant, in 1844 he began an excavation campaign in Salona which proved to be very successful, with a series of interesting findings that helped to get a better knowledge of the Roman city. In these years he strengthened his friendship with some of the greatest Dalmatian and Italian intellectuals of the time, including Niccolò Tommaseo, Cesare Cantù, Francesco Dall'Ongaro and Pier Alessandro Paravia.

== Excavations and the controversies ==
The envy of the detractors intertwined in those years with the turbulence within the Austrian Empire.

In 1847, Carrara – at the head of the Dalmatian delegation – took part in the Congress of Italian Scientists in Venice, where he gave a report entitled "The Excavations of Salona" (Gli scavi di Salona), published by the Giornale Euganeo di Scienze e Lettere. On his return to Spalato he devoted himself to a campaign of studies and excavations along the Cetina river, to study the position of the Roman Aequum and the Pons Tiluri, which led from Tenin to Narona and in Bosnia to the ancient Delminium.

In October 1849, he was revoked from teaching at the seminary in Spalato, accused of nurturing exalted political ideas and instilling them in young people. A petition signed by 170 citizens and articles in his defense in the city newspapers were to no avail. Yet, for the time being, funding for archaeological excavations weren't interrupted.

In 1850, he published in Trieste the volume Topography and Excavations of Salona (Topografia e scavi di Salona), which remains his most famous work. Divided into two parts, the first deals with the topography of Salona, while the second analytically describes the works on the monuments and artifacts discovered year by year from 1846 to 1849. The work is accompanied by seven original plates, based on surveys carried out over the years.

He then resumed excavations, but was forced to suspend them as his funding was withdrawn. Carrara appealed to the government and even to King Frederick Augustus II of Saxony, a botany enthusiast, a visitor to Dalmatia at the time and an admirer of Sebenico native botanist Roberto de Visiani: all was in vain.

The only assignment he managed to get was to compose an anthology for schools. Carrara then embarked on a study trip to Venice, at the Marciana Library. The result was a work in two volumes, of which only the first - dedicated to the thirteenth and fourteenth centuries - was published (Antologia italiana, Vienna 1853).

== Legacy ==
The headquarters of the Community of Italians in Spalato is named after Spalato's native Francesco Carrara.

In Croatian sources his name is sometimes also transliterated Franjo Carrara.

== Chief works ==
- Teodora Ducaina Paleologhina. Piombo unico inedito. Vienna. 1840.
- Archivio capitolare di Spalato. Spalato: Dalla tipografia Oliveti e comp. 1844.
- Chiesa di Spalato un tempo Salonitana. Trieste: Papsch. 1844.
- La Dalmazia descritta con 48 tavole miniate rappresentanti i principali costumi nazionali. Zara: Battara. 1846.
- Canti del popolo dalmata. Zara: Battaria. 1849.
- Della vita e degli scritti di Giovanni Cattalinich. Zara: Tipi Battara. 1849.
- Topografia e scavi di Salona. Trieste: Tip. del Lloyd austriaco. 1850.
- De' scavi di Salona nel 1850. Prague: Haase. 1852.
- Antologia italiana, proposta alle classi de' ginnasi liceali. 3 vols. Vienna: Amministrazione per la vendita de' libri scolastici. 1853.

== Bibliography ==
- Semi, F. (1992). "Francesco Carrara". In F. Semi; V. Tacconi (eds.). Istria e Dalmazia. Uomini e tempi. Dalmazia. Udine: Del Bianco.
- Bralić, S. (2005). "Il piccolo mondo dalmata visto con gli occhi di Francesco Carrara - 150 anni dalla morte". Adriatico/Jadran. Rivista di cultura tra le due sponde. Atti del I Congresso internazionale della Cultura Adriatica. Pescara: Fondazione Ernesto Giammarco. pp. 162–173.
- Garbin, D. (2007). Salona negli scavi di Francesco Carrara. Spalato: Centro Ricerche Culturali Dalmate di Spalato. ISBN 9788890312908.
- S. Gliubich, Dizionario biografico degli uomini illustri della Dalmazia, ristampa anastatica dell'edizione di Vienna-Zara del 1856, Arnaldo Forni Editore, Bologna 1974.
- C. von Wurzbach, Biographisches Lexikon des Kaisertums Österreich, II, Wien 1857.
- Cella, Sergio (1977). "CARRARA, Francesco". Dizionario Biografico degli Italiani (in Italian). Vol. 20: Carducci–Carusi. Rome: Istituto dell'Enciclopedia Italiana. ISBN 978-88-12-00032-6.
