= Adolf Mussafia =

Dalmatian philologist (1834–1905)

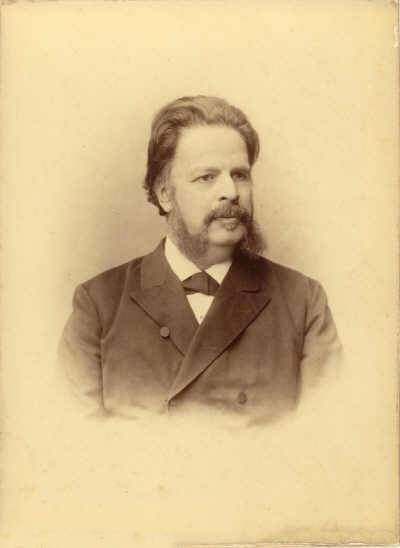
Adolf Mussafia

Adolf Mussafia (15 February 1835 – 7 June 1905), also known as Adolfo Mussafia or Adolpho Mussaphia, was a polyglot Dalmatian Italian philologist from Dalmatia, author of over 350 works.
