= Silvio Ballarin =

Dalmatian Italian mathematician (1901–1969)

Silvio Ballarin (1901 – 1969) was a Dalmatian Italian mathematician and university professor.

He was born in Zara (today Zadar) in 1901, which at the time was still part of Austria-Hungary. He graduated in mathematics from the University of Bologna in 1924. Ballarin taught topography at the University of Pisa starting from 1950. He was principally interested in gravimetry and geodesy. Ballarin performed many gravimetric measurements in Italy.

== Bibliography ==
- Gero Geri - Brunetto Palla. BALLARIN, Silvio. Dizionario Biografico degli Italiani - Volume 34 (1988).
- Attilio Selvini (2013). Appunti per una storia della topografia in Italia nel XX secolo. Maggioli Editore, 2013. pp. 22–25. ISBN 978-88-387-6211-6.
