= Alessandro Dudan =

Dalmatian Italian politician

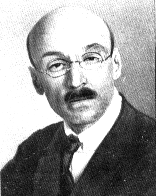

Senator

Personal details
- Born: 29 January 1883 Vrlika, Kingdom of Dalmatia, Austria-Hungary
- Died: 31 March 1957 (aged 74) Rome, Italy

Alessandro Dudan (29 January 1883 – 31 March 1957) was a Dalmatian Italian politician and senator. As a member of the Autonomist Party, he rejected the unification of Kingdom of Dalmatia with the Kingdom of Croatia-Slavonia.

== Early life and studies ==
Dudan was born in Vrlika, a small town which was a part of the Kingdom of Dalmatia, an administrative division (kingdom) within the Austro-Hungarian Empire. Dudan spent his childhood in Split, where his family had established nobility for centuries and had given the city a mayor (Leonardo Dudan, mayor between 1848 and 1853). His father, Antonio, was one of the richest landowners in Dalmatia. His mother, Caterina Gazzara, belonged to one of the most prominent families of the Italian community in Split.

== Participation in World War I ==
At the outbreak of World War I, Dudan fled from Austria to Italy. In Italy, he served as acting president of the Italian Pro-Dalmatia and advocated for intervention against the central powers. During that period he published a famous essay, which was imbued with irredentism and opened considerable historical and political debate in that transitional period.

When Italy entered the war, Dudan was appointed as a volunteer cavalry officer. He distinguished himself and was decorated with a Cross of War. A Fascist from the movement's beginning in 1919, he worked fervently for the maintenance-costs promises made to Italy in the Treaty of London, and was a member of the Italian delegation at the peace conference in Paris. At the news of the Impresa di Fiume, he left to become a legionnaire under Gabriele d'Annunzio.

== Italian art history ==
Between 1921 and 1922, Dudan wrote: Twenty Centuries of Civilization: A Ponderous work of Art History in Italian Dalmatia. His work presented a comprehensive overview of the history of Dalmatia in relation to contemporary artistic events. In particular, Dudan deepened the connections between Dalmatian and Italian art. Historians who found this study important have included Adolfo Venturi, Bernard Berenson, Joseph Fiocco, Mario Salmi, and Rodolfo Pallucchini.

== Politician ==
Dudan is directly linked to his "national border". He participated in the March on Rome, representing the Italian fascists of Zadar and Dalmatia. As Consul of the Militia, he was elected to the Chamber of Deputies for the first time in 1921 from Rome, and again in 1924 and 1929 as an at-large delegate.

Dudan was a Freemason, probably from his time in Vienna. In 1918, he was the master of the "Universe" gallery in Rome. During the meeting of the Grand Council of Fascism on 23 February 1923, he was among those who abstained from voting, believing in the incompatibility of Fascism and Masonry. Due to this, he was ejected from the Grand Lodge of Italy.

On 1 March 1934, he was appointed a senator of the Kingdom and was sworn in on 4 May that year. In his parliamentary work, he always reminded representatives not to forget Dalmatia.

At the outbreak of World War II, Dudan managed to finally achieve his dream: annexation of much of Dalmatia and the creation of the Governorship of Dalmatia. However, in 1944 Dudan was arrested and imprisoned in Padula and remitted to the High Court of Justice for Sanctions against Fascism. His senatorship was revoked on 28 December 1944.

== Last years and death ==
Dudan spent the last years of his life working for Istrian-Dalmatian exile associations. He died in his house in Rome on 31 March 1957.

== See also ==
- Autonomist Party
- Irredentism
- Vrlika
