= Franco Luxardo =

Dalmatian Italian entrepreneur

- Born: 12 February 1936; Zadar
- Awards: Stella al merito sportivo

Franco Luxardo (born on 12 February 1936) is a Dalmatian Italian entrepreneur, sports manager and former fencer.

== Biography ==
He was a fencer for the A.S. Comini 1885 Padova Scherma, wearing the Italian national jersey from 1959 to 1968. In 1955 he started the Trofeo Luxardo - Coppa del Mondo di Sciabola.

An entrepreneur in the liquor branch, together with his family, he runs the Girolamo Luxardo SpA of Torreglia, in the Province of Padua. In this company he deals with the export sales direction.

He is the President of the Dalmatian Society of Homeland History of Venice (since 2007), of the Association of Dalmatian Italians in the World, and of the company Petrarca Impianti Scherma-Padova.
