= Kamerlengo Castle =

Fortification in Croatia

Kamerlengo Castle Kaštel Kamerlengo
- Trogir; Croatia
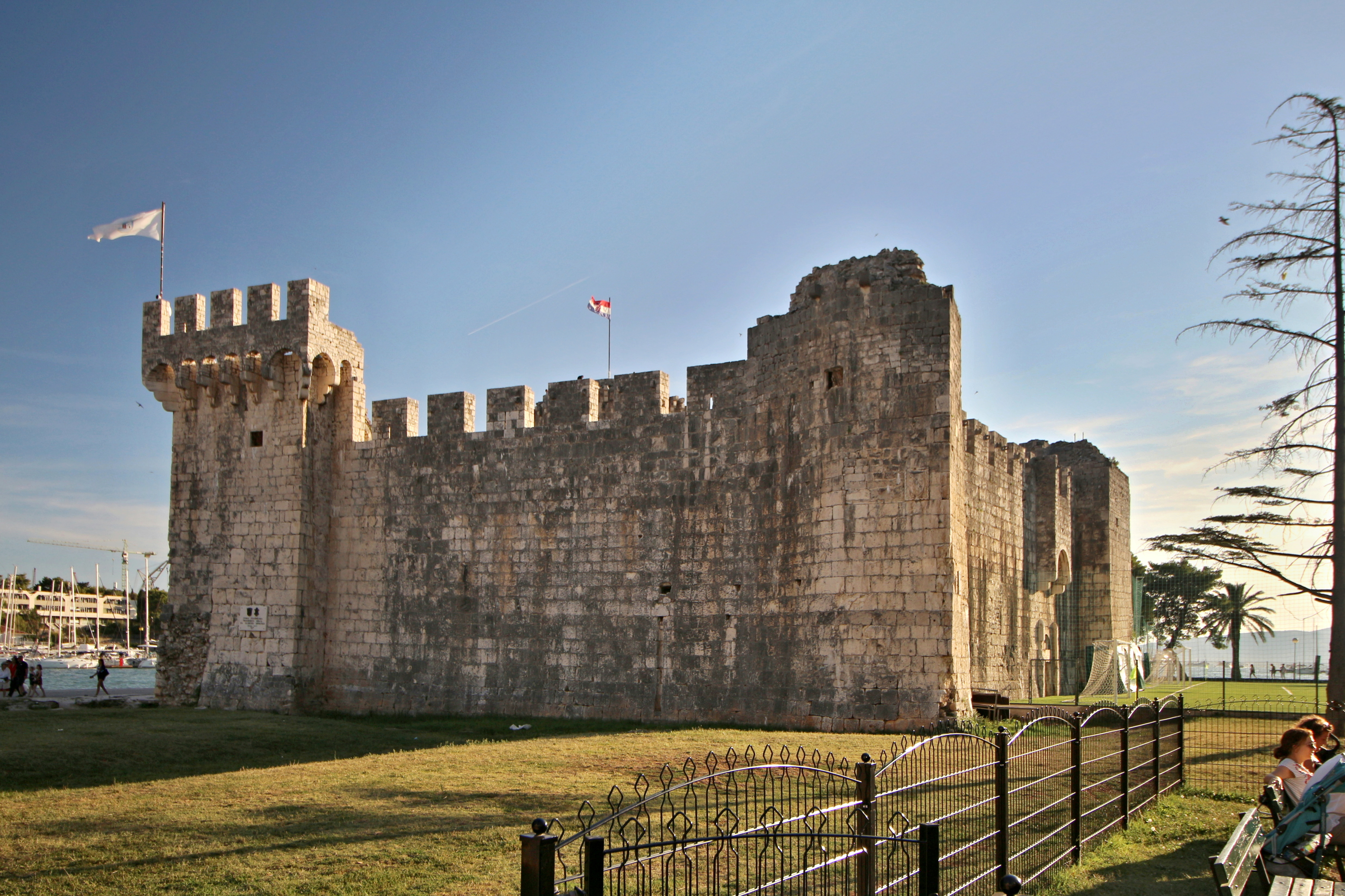
- Kamerlengo Castle

Site information
- Type: Castle
- Owner: City of Trogir, Croatia
- Controlled by: Venetian Republic
- Condition: Preserved

Location
- Coordinates: 43.5152°N 16.2474°E
- Height: 30m

Site history
- Built: 1420–1437; 589 years ago
- Built by: Marin Radoj
- Materials: Limestone

Kamerlengo Castle (Croatian: Kaštel Kamerlengo; Italian: Castello del Camerlengo) is a castle and fortress in Trogir, Croatia.

== History ==
The castle was built in the mid-15th century by Marin Radoj as part of an expansion of the Veriga Tower, built on the site in the late 14th century. It is used as a location for performances during the summer months. The word kamerlengo (Italian: camerlengo) refers to the title of an administrative official (a chamberlain).

In 1420 the Venetian Republic conquered Trogir after a siege of almost 2 months. As the city's defenses were badly damaged during the siege and the people of Trogir were hostile to their new lords, the Venetians felt the need to erect a city-castle from which they could rule the newly conquered city. So, between 1420 and 1437 they built Kamerlengo Castle and the former corner tower of the city walls became a keep. Originally, the fortress was separated from the city by an outer crenelated wall and a wet moat. It housed the Venetian mercenaries and their kamerlengo (governor). At first, it was just known as the castle of Trogir, only since the mid-16th century did it became known as Kamerlengo Castle. In the mid-19th century, most of the city walls were demolished, and the castle moat was filled in. There were even plans to tear down the dilapidated castle, but this was prevented.

In the Kamerlengo courtyard, a smaller chapel was built dedicated to St. Mark, the patron saint of the Venetian Republic. Below the monumental relief of the lion was a smaller one with the coat of arms of the Tron family in a quadrilobe. Luka Tron distinguished himself as the sopracomite of the Venetian galley during the surrender of Korčula and the siege of Trogir, and was awarded the confidential function of city prince (1421–1424), the second in a row since the establishment of the new Venetian administration. The Gothic relief of the lion with the initials DC and the coat of arms of the Contarini family was made after the capture of Trogir in the 15th century and placed on the chapel in memory of Doge Domenico Contarini I (1043–1071), who is mentioned in the Venetian annals in the context of the conquest of Zadar in the mid-12th century.

== See also ==
- Croatia
- Trogir
- Klis Fortress
- Dalmatia
