= Pier Alessandro Paravia =

Italian writer

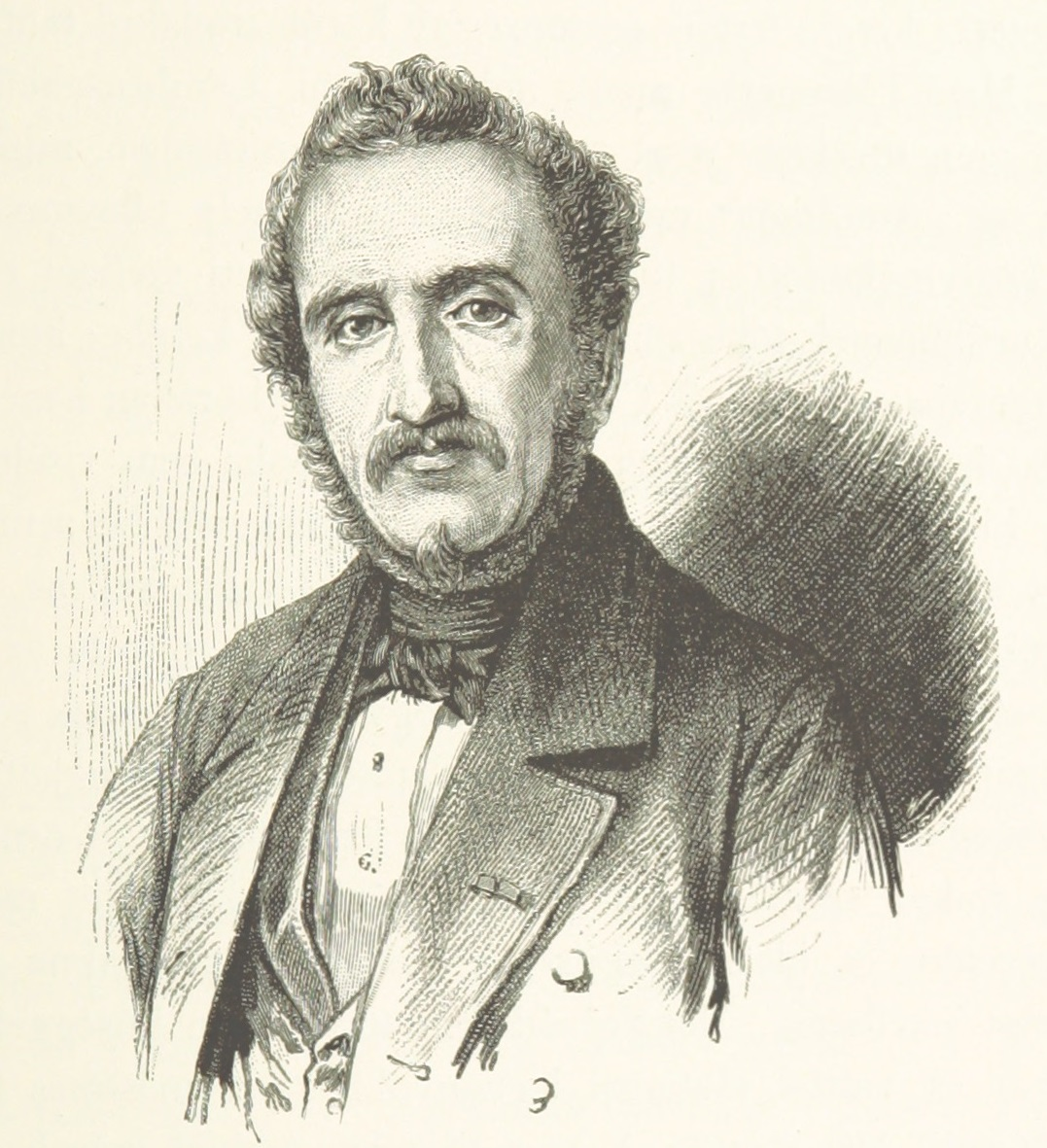
- portrait of Pier Alessandro Paravia
- Born: 15 July 1797; Zara, Republic of Venice (now Croatia)
- Died: 18 March 1857 (aged 59); Turin, Kingdom of Sardinia (now Italy)
- Resting place: Turin
- Education: University of Padua
- Occupations: Scholar, writer, philologist
- Writing career
- Period: 1820 - 1857
- Genre: essays
- Notable works: Dei Sentimenti Patriottici, Vita di Antonio Canova
- Notable awards: Accademia della Crusca; 1850 honour – member
- Movement: Italian Risorgimento

Pier Alessandro Paravia was born in Zara, Dalmatia on July 15, 1797, and was a Dalmatian Italian writer, scholar, philanthropist and professor of Italian eloquence at the University of Turin.

== Biography ==
=== Early years ===
Son of Giovanni, colonel of the Oltremarini (or Schiavoni), an elite infantry division of the Navy of the Republic of Venice, and grandson of Antonio, also a naval officer of the Venetian Republic, he was born in Zara (present-day Zadar) two months after the fall of the Republic.

As a child he moved to Venice, where he studied at the Lyceum of Santa Caterina. He graduated in law at Padua in 1818, and served in Venice as a state functionary for twelve years, until - in 1832 - he was called to the chair of Eloquence of the Faculty of Philosophy at the University of Turin. He had already published several studies: mostly biographies of writers and artists, but also a popular translation of the Letters of Pliny the Younger.

=== In Turin ===
On taking up his new post, he commenced a prolific period of production, in which he ranged from Italian literature (studies on Torquato Tasso and Ariosto) to Provençal literature and even Chinese novels (which he was one of the first to study in Italy). In addition to literature, he was also interested in history and politics, to which he dedicated an essay significantly entitled Del Sentimento Patrio ("On Patriotic Feeling"). He purchased a villa near Treviso (in Veneto, then part of the Austrian Empire), which he frequented. Although politically conservative, he was constantly monitored by the Austro-Hungarians, owing to his adherence to Italian patriotic ideals

He was a friend of and corresponded with many Italians - from Niccolò Tommaseo to Silvio Pellico, from King Charles Albert of Sardinia to Vincenzo Gioberti - and had an affection for Antonio Rosmini, whom he had known since his days at the University of Padua.

Greatly interested in the Italian language, he wrote important essays about it which earned him a nomination to the Accademia della Crusca.

He died in Turin on March 18, 1857. In his honor a herma was erected at the University of Turin, where is also preserved a large and valuable collection of manuscripts that had belonged to his uncle Antonio.

== Relationship with Zadar ==
Paravia never forgot his native town of Zara, and after a visit in 1850, he donated his private library of over ten thousand volumes in 1855 to create a public library, which was later named in his honor Municipal Library Paravia. Its purpose was not simply philanthropic. Paravia pleaded: "Study your language, because in it lies your future greatness; it is a merit which nobody can deny you, and it is great honor." Paravia clearly meant, through his donation, to send a strong message to the Dalmatians, so much so that he invited the leaders of contemporary Italian culture, with whom he maintained a very active correspondence, to also offer books. This library, which was housed in the ancient Venetian Loggia of Zara/Zadar until 1938, was from its opening on August 18, 1857, the largest in the whole of Dalmatia. Closed during World War II, it was reopened on October 14, 1945, with the new name Narodna Biblioteka (National Library).

== National identification ==
Given Paravia's personal history, his enthusiastic adhesion to the sentiments of the Italian Risorgimento and his explicit affirmations of nationality (he wrote "No one can be a great writer without being a national writer, without representing, that is, in his writings his proper nation, his proper era."), until recently his nationality was not in question. In present-day Croatia, however, his surname is occasionally found transliterated as Paravija, his explicit choice of nationality is regularly omitted, and he is simply indicated as having been born in Zara.

While there is no doubt that Pier Alessandro Paravia was an Italian by nationality, the demarcation line of his class ancestry as stipulated by the Republic of Venice, links to the Schiavoni regiment and the 19th century society, suggests a family connection to an untitled commoner merchant class, which was a status above normal commoners. In today's Dalmatia, people of mixed Northern Italian and Croatian ancestry whose families were tied to the merchant classes (both titled and untitled) are sometimes referred to as Lombard Dalmatian (Lombardsko Dalmatinski) indicating affiliation to the Dalmatian commonwealth and culture. This may be the source of the confusion in question.

Further to that, the Croatisation of Latin/Italian surnames and Italianization of Slavic surnames was an age-old tradition in Venetian Dalmatia and the Republic of Ragusa that simply translates a given name into dual language formats as means to acceptance and/or trade branding. While it does not imply a current shift in self identity, the collusion could, in theory, create perplexity (and to some degree bewilderment), from a historical point of view.

== Works ==
- News about the life of Antonio Canova, Venice 1822 - complete work available here
- Versi, Venice 1825
- Traduzione delle lettere di Plinio il Giovane, Venice 1830-1832 (3 volumes)
- Lettere inedite di illustri italiani, Venice 1833
- Delle relazioni del Cristianesimo con la letteratura, Turin 1837
- Notizie intorno ai Generali della Repubblica Veneta, Turin 1837
- Sistema mitologico di Dante, Turin 1837–1839
- Orazione per l'onomastico di Carlo Alberto, Turin 1838 - complete work available here
- Del sentimento patrio nelle sue relazioni con la letteratura, Turin 1839
- Biografie degli Italiani illustri, Venice 1840
- Prolusioni e discorsi, Parma 1845
- Antologia italiana, Turin 1847
- Canzoniere nazionale scelto e annotato, Turin 1849
- Memorie veneziane di letteratura e di storia, Turin 1850 - complete work available here
- Lezioni accademiche e altre prose, Zara 1851
- Lezioni di letteratura, Turin 1852 (second edition in 1856)
- Carlo Alberto e il suo regno. Orazioni, Voghera 1852 - complete work available here
- Vincenzo Gioberti. Prelezione accademica, Turin 1853 - complete work available here

== See also ==
- Dalmatian Italians
- Dalmatia
- Zadar
