= List of people from Zadar =

The following is a list of notable people who were born in the Croatian town of Zadar. Zadar natives are referred to as Zadrani. For people born in Zadar County, see List of people from Zadar County.

== A ==
- Vladan Alanović (born 1967), basketball player.
- Ingrid Antičević-Marinović (born 1957), lawyer, politician, Minister of Justice, Public Administration and Local Self-government, justice of the Constitutional Court.

== B ==
- Silvio Ballarin (1901–1969), mathematician and university professor.
- Marko Banić (born 1984), basketball player.
- Igor Banović (born 1987), football player.
- Juraj Baraković (1548–1628), poet.
- Lovre Bašić (born 1995), basketball player.
- Nikola Bašić (born 1946), architect.
- Ivan Batur (born 1991), basketball player.
- Luka Begonja (born 1992), football player.
- Josip Bilaver (born 1984), football player.
- Saša Bjelanović (born 1979), football player.
- Sava Bjelanović (1850–1897), politician and journalist.
- Vlatko Blažević (born 1994), football player.
- Jure Brkljača (born 1994), singer.
- Spiridon Brusina (1845-1909), malacologist.
- Zoran Bujas (1910–2004), psychiatrist.
- Ante Bukvić (born 1987), football player.
- Jurica Buljat (born 1986), football player.
- Marijan Buljat (born 1981), football player.

== C ==
- Marjan Čakarun (born 1990), basketball player.
- Tullio Carminati (1894–1971), actor.
- Stefan Cebara (born 1991), professional soccer player.
- Čika (died 1095), founder of the Benedictine monastery of St. Mary.
- Andrea Cippico (1877–1935), Italian senator.
- Arturo Colautti (1851–1914), journalist, polemicist and librettist.
- Igor Crnadak (born 1972), politician.
- Branko Culina (born 1957), football player and trainer.
- Hrvoje Ćustić (1983–2008), football player.
- Zoran Čutura (born 1962), basketball player.

== D ==
- Renzo de' Vidovich (born 1934), politician, historian and journalist.
- Vladan Desnica (1905–1967), writer.
- Valter Dešpalj (1947-2023), cellist and music professor.
- Natali Dizdar (born 1984), singer.
- Donatus of Zadar, Catholic saint and bishop.

== G ==
- Giorgio da Sebenico (1410–1475), sculptor and architect.
- Josip Gjergja (born 1937), basketball player and coach.
- Gjon Rënësi, (1567-1624), Albanian rebel.
- Mladen Grdović (born 1958), singer.
- Alan Gregov (born 1970), basketball player.

== H ==
- Helen of Zadar (?-976), queen consort of the Kingdom of Croatia.

== I ==
- Ive Ivanov (born 1985), basketball player.
- Tomislav Ivčić (1953–1993), singer and composer.

== J ==
- Jakov Varingez (c. 1400 – 1485), blessed of the Roman Catholic Church, patron of the Italian town of Bitetto.
- Toni Jeričević (born 1983), businessman, actor, TV host.
- Joanna II of Naples (1373–1435), Queen of Naples.
- Pope John IV (died 12 October 642) reigned from 24 December 640 to his death in 642.

== K ==
- Pavle Kalinić (born 1959), politician and writer.
- Božidar Kalmeta (born 1958), politician and Mayor of Zadar.
- Tomislav Karamarko (born 1959), politician and First Deputy Prime Minister of Croatia.
- Brne Karnarutić (1515–1573), poet.
- Emilija Kokić (born 1968), singer.
- Arijan Komazec (born 1970), basketball player.
- Emilio Kovačić (born 1968), basketball player.
- Šimun Kožičić Benja (1460-1536), orator, humanist and printer.
- Marie Kraja (1911–1999), opera singer.
- Ante Krapić (born 1985), basketball player.

== L ==
- Boris Labar (born 1947), physician and scientist in the field of hematology and hematopoietic stem cell transplantation.
- Francesco Laurana (1430–1502), sculptor and architect.
- Luciano Laurana (c. 1420 – 1479), architect and engineer.
- Tihana Lazović (born 1990), actress.

== M ==
- Davor Marcelić (born 1969), basketball player.
- Pavle Marčinković (born 1989), basketball player.
- Marcela Marić (born 1996), diver.
- Oliver Maric (born 1981), football player.
- Petar Marić (born 1987), basketball player.
- Dominik Mavra (born 1994), basketball player.
- Stelvio Mestrovich (born 1958), writer, musicologist, and critic.
- Luka Modrić (born 1985), football player.
- Vedran Morović (born 1983), basketball player.

== N ==
- Antun Nalis (1911–2000), actor.
- Benedikt Nikpalj (born 1993), bobsledder.
- Ivan Novačić (born 1985), basketball player.

== O ==
- Marc Ostarcevic (born 1941), basketball player.

== P ==
- Darko Pahlić (born 1963), basketball player.
- Pier Alessandro Paravia (1797–1857), writer, scholar, philanthropist and professor of Italian eloquence.
- Bernarda Pera (born 1994), tennis player.
- Ivan Perinčić (born 1977), basketball player.
- Teo Petani (born 1988), basketball player.
- Doris Pinčić (born 1988), actress and TV and radio presenter.
- Joseph Plachutta (1827–1883), chess player.
- Marko Popović (born 1982), basketball player.
- Herdi Prenga (born 1994), football player.
- Zoran Primorac (born 1969), table tennis player.
- Toni Prostran (born 1991), basketball player.
- Dado Pršo (born 1974), football player.

== R ==
- Ivana Radovniković (born 1985), singer.
- Tomislav Ružić (born 1979), basketball player.

== S ==
- Franko Šango (born 1992), basketball player.
- Andrea Schiavone (c. 1510/1515–1563), painter.
- Giorgio da Sebenico (1410-1473), sculptor and architect from Dalmatia.
- Juraj Segarić (born 1993), basketball player.
- Mima Simić (born 1976), writer, film critic, translator, LGBT activist.
- Velimir Škorpik, Yugoslav Partisan commander.
- Branko Skroče (born 1955), basketball player.
- Tamara Šoletić (born 1965), actress.
- Šime Špralja (born 1983), basketball player.
- Simone Stratigo (1733–1824), mathematician and a nautical science.
- Jovan Sundečić (1825–1900), poet, Orthodox Christian priest, secretary of Prince Nikola I of Montenegro.
- Ivan Santini (born 1989), football player.

== T ==
- Carlo Tivaroni (1843–1906), historian and politician.
- Enrico Tivaroni (1841–1925), Italian senator and magistrate.
- Georg von Trapp (1880–1947), K.u.K. Submarine commander and father of "singing Trapp family".

== V ==
- Jakov Varingez (1400–1496), Roman Catholic professed religious of the Order of Friars Minor.
- Vekenega (died 1111), abbess of the Benedictine monastery of St. Mary.
- Vladimir Velebit (1907–2004), Yugoslav People's Army Major-General, lawyer, historian, diplomat.
- Giorgio Ventura (c. 1570 – c. 1610), painter.
- Dalibor Veselinović (born 1987), football player.
- Jeronim Vidulić (c. 1430 – 1499), poet.
- Jakov Vladović (born 1983), basketball player.

== W ==
- Felix Weingartner (1863–1942), composer.

== Z ==
- Anđeo Lovrov Zadranin, 14th-century architect.
- Juraj Lovrov Zadranin, 14th-century architect.
- Luigi Ziliotto, (1863–1922), politician, podestà of Zadar (Zara).
- Ksenija Zečević (1956–2006), pianist and composer.
- Petar Zoranić (c. 1508, died 1543–1569), writer.
- Luka Žorić (born 1984), basketball player.
- Katija Zubčić (born 1958), actress.
- Tomislav Zubčić (born 1990), basketball player.
- Jurica Žuža (born 1978), basketball player.
