= List of Croatian architects =

This is a list of notable architects from Croatia.

== A ==
- Vladoje Aksmanović
- Alfred Albini
- Andrija Aleši
- Vicko Andrić
- Ante Anin

== B ==
- Vjekoslav Bastl
- Nikola Bašić

== D ==
- Juraj Dalmatinac
- Julio Deutsch

== F ==
- Nikola Firentinac
- Ignjat Fischer
- Igor Franić

== G ==
- Stjepan Gomboš

== H ==
- Vjekoslav Heinzel
- Leo Hönigsberg

== I ==
- Drago Ibler

== J ==
- Bruno Juričić

== K ==
- Franjo Klein
- Viktor Kovačić

== L ==
- Luciano Laurana (Lucijan Vranjanin)
- Slavko Löwy
- Aleksandar Ljahnicky

== M ==
- Paskoje Miličević Mihov

== N ==
- Juraj Neidhardt
- Velimir Neidhardt

== P ==
- Stjepan Planić

== R ==
- Božidar Rašica
- Vjenceslav Richter
- Ante Rožić

== S ==
- Josip Seissel

== Š ==
- Edo Šen
- Vladimir Šterk

== T ==
- Petar Trifunović

== V ==
- Josip Vancaš
- Ivan Vitić
- Franjo Vranjanin

== Z ==
- Anđeo Lovrov Zadranin
- Juraj Lovrov Zadranin
- Milan Zloković
