= Krasić =

Krasić (Serbian Cyrillic: Красић) is a South Slavic surname, derived from the word krasiti ("to adorn"). It may refer to:

- Bojan Krasić (born 1983), Serbian footballer
- Marko Krasić (born 1985), Serbian footballer
- Miloš Krasić (born 1984), Serbian footballer
- Stjepan Krasić, Croatian priest and historian

== See also ==
- Krasići, two settlements north of Tovrljane in the Toplica District, Serbia
- Krašić, a village in central Croatia
- Krasović, similar surname
