= Stelvio =

Stelvio may refer to

- Stelvio, the Italian name for the municipality of Stilfs in South Tyrol
- Stelvio (ski course), a downhill ski course in Bormio, Italy, named after the Stelvio Pass
- Stelvio Pass, a mountain pass in Italy
- Stelvio National Park, a national park of Italy
- Stelvio (cheese), a cheese named after the village
- Stelvio, a suburb of Newport, United Kingdom
- Stélvio (footballer), Angolan footballer
- Stelvio Cipriani, Italian composer
- Stelvio Massi, Italian film director
- Stelvio Mestrovich, Italian musicologist
- Alfa Romeo Stelvio, a sport utility vehicle named for the Stelvio Pass
- Moto Guzzi Stelvio, a dual-sport motorcycle named for the Stelvio Pass and manufactured by the Italian company, Moto Guzzi, since 2007
