= Casa dei Cavalieri di Malta =

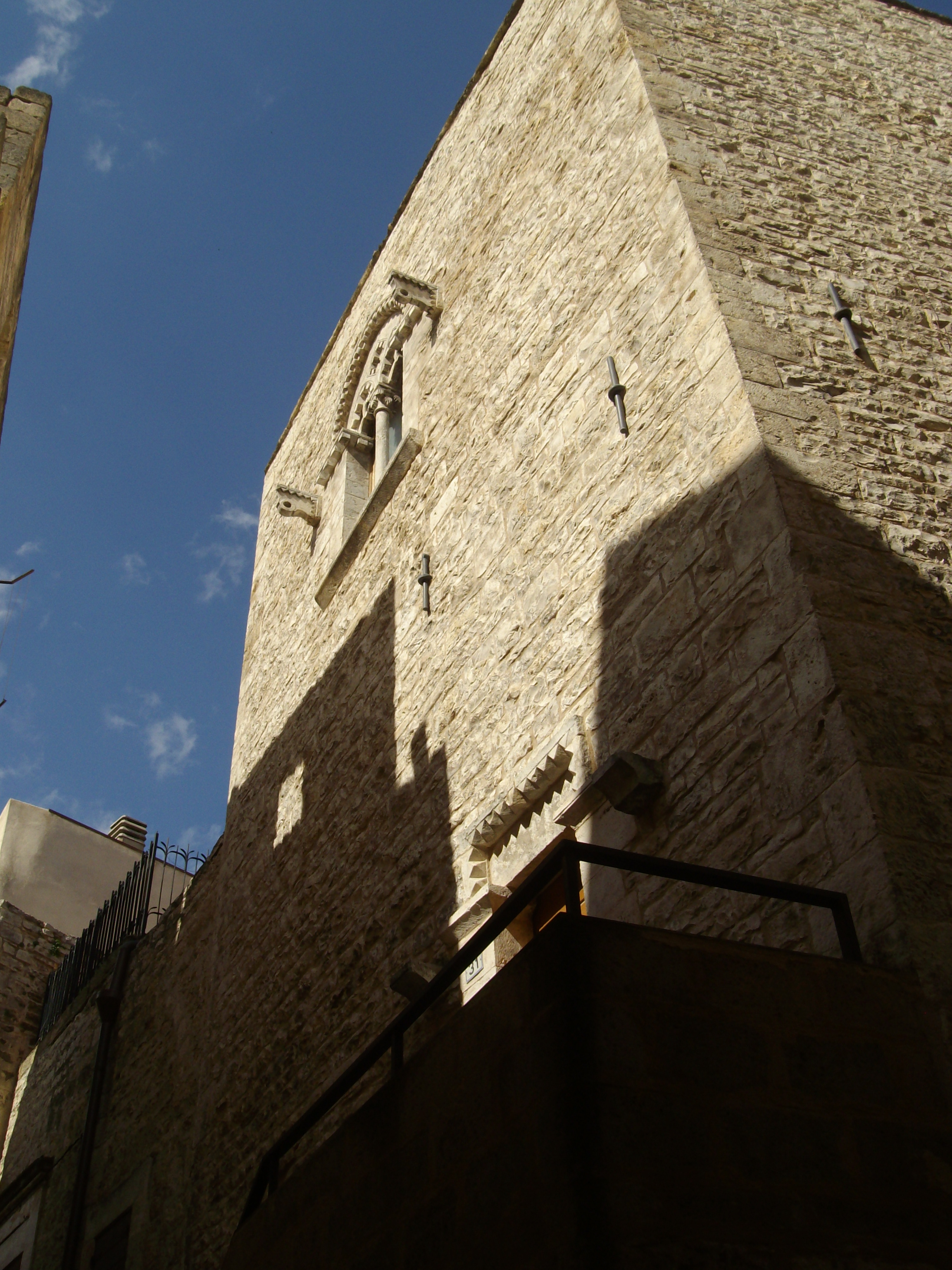
- The building's façade
- Interactive map of the Casa dei Cavalieri di Malta area

General information
- Status: Intact
- Type: House
- Location: Bitetto, Metropolitan City of Bari, Apulia, Italy
- Coordinates: 41°2′26.02″N 16°44′57.58″E
- Named for: Knights of Malta
- Completed: c. 13th–14th centuries

Technical details
- Material: Stone

The Casa dei Cavalieri di Malta (Italian for House of the Knights of Malta) is a historic building in the old town of Bitetto, in the Metropolitan City of Bari, Italy. The building is traditionally associated with the Knights Hospitaller, also known as the Knights of Malta.

== History ==
=== Attribution to the Knights of Malta ===
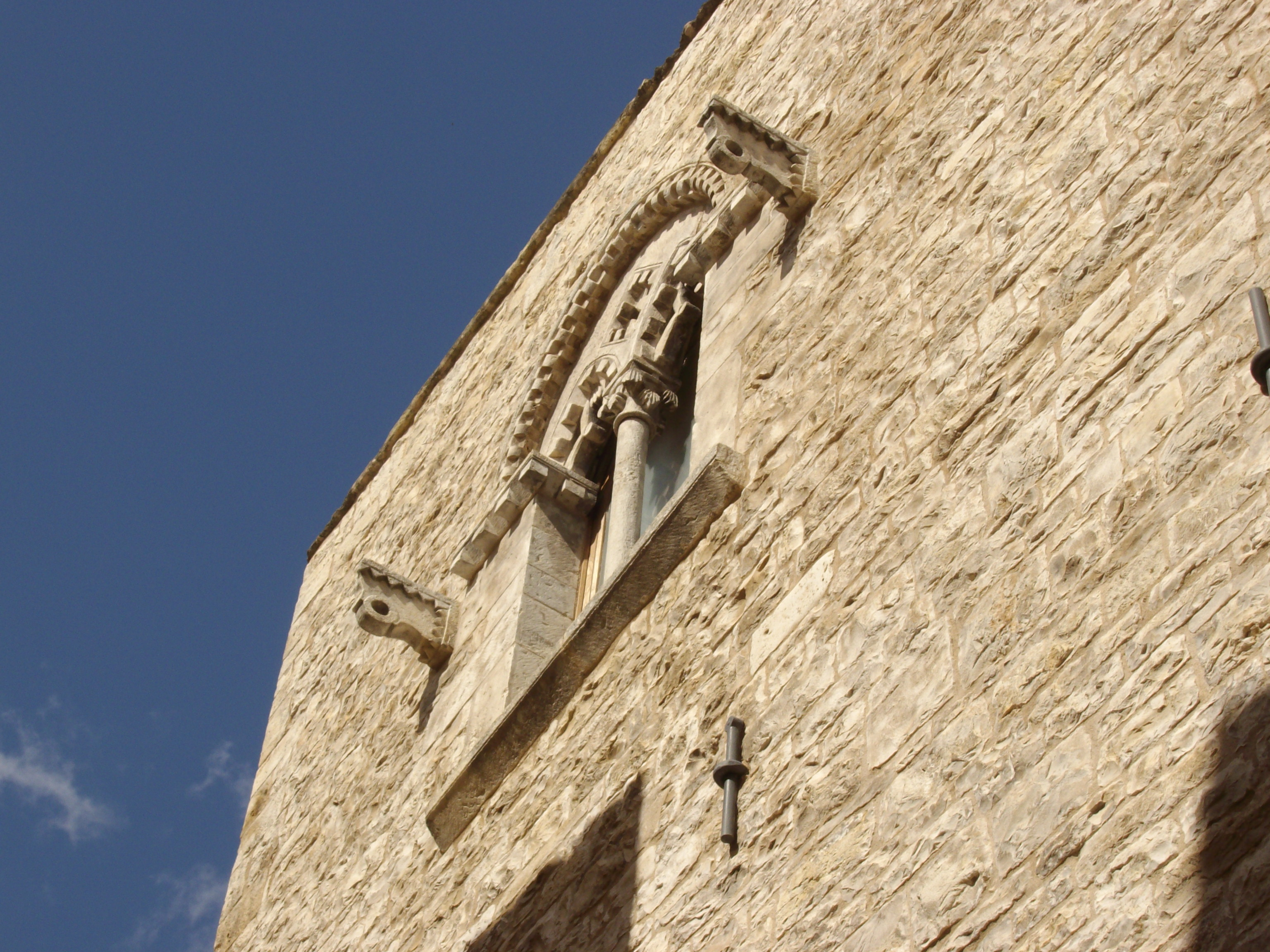
The building's mullioned window

Very little is known about the building, and its relation to the Knights Hospitaller is derived from popular tradition. Some authors state that the house gave shelter to knights during the Crusades, while on their journey to the Holy Land. However, the building is believed to have been constructed in the late Middle Ages, possibly around the 14th century, judging from its style including its mullioned windows, which seem to be contemporary to the last reconstruction of the Cathedral. The first inhabitants of the building are unknown, and there is no indication of its original use.

Research carried out at the State Archives of Naples found no trace of members of the Knights Hospitaller from Bitetto. Another search in Barletta, seat of the Priory of Apulia, whose documents were transferred to the State Archives of Bari, was unsuccessful since the papers are believed to have been destroyed in a fire. However, it has been found that the Della Marra family wore the habit of the Order in 1381, and Giovanni della Marra had been feudal lord of Bitetto from 1305 until his death in 1311.

The Segreteria della Commenda di Malta in Rome also stated that their files do not make any reference to any buildings in Bitetto. The same is true of an act dated 26 November 1471 by the notary Nicola Guglielmo of Naples, in which Bernardo Garano di Riccaseus was entrusted with the Hospitaller commandery in Apulia, which included Bitetto. The document mentioned various holdings and assets, but none in Bitetto.

Perhaps irrefutable proof to the fact that in the past no one talked about this building is the fact that the emblem of the Commenda di Malta, which depicts a rampant griffin, is completely absent in the complex.

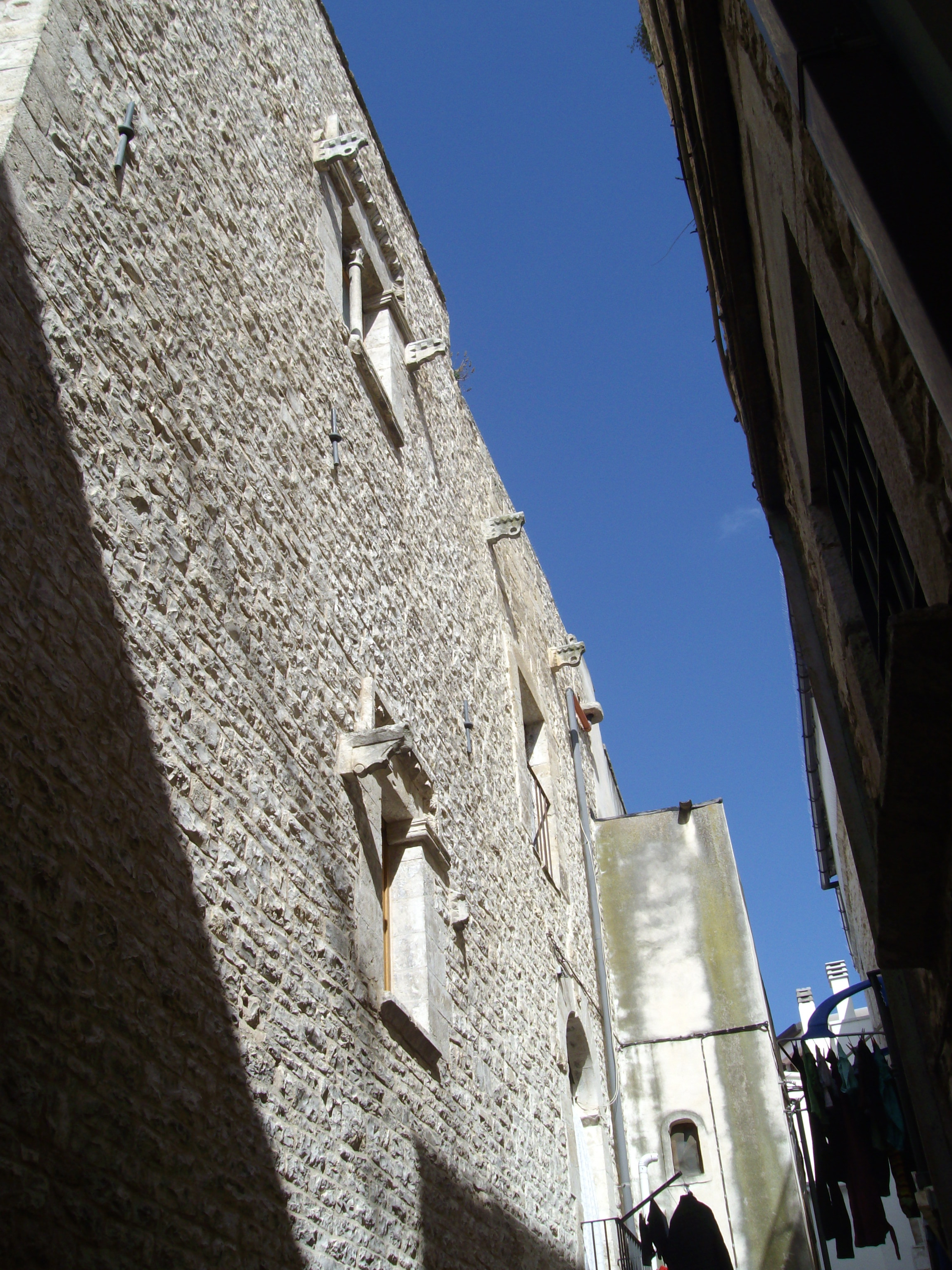
The building's second floor

=== Known owners and inhabitants ===
==== Ottavio de Nicolò ====
On the building's façade there is a coat of arms which is divided into two: the right depicting a castle with two towers on the sea (identical to another emblem found at the courtyard of the Bitonto Cathedral), and the left depicting a bearded face and a lily. The presence of the initials O. N. suggests that it belongs to Ottavio de Nicolò or Nicolai, who fought in the Portuguese Restoration War and became vice-admiral of the Marina of Giovinazzo. From the date on the shield, it is understood that the complex was readapted in 1608.

==== Seminary of Conza ====
In the 17th century, the building also housed some part of the seminary of Conza. A plaque placed under the coat of arms reads Intrent securi qui querunt vivere pure. 1610, referring to future men of God. The seminary was a centre of studies for thirty eight years, and documents show that it was closed down in 1648. In 1753 a procurator who administered the property was still housed in the building

==== Casa Fazio ====
The Casa dei Cavalieri di Malta is also defined as Casa Fazio as reported in Blasonario Generale di Terra di Bari (1912) written by Edgardo Noya from Bitetto.

== Architecture ==
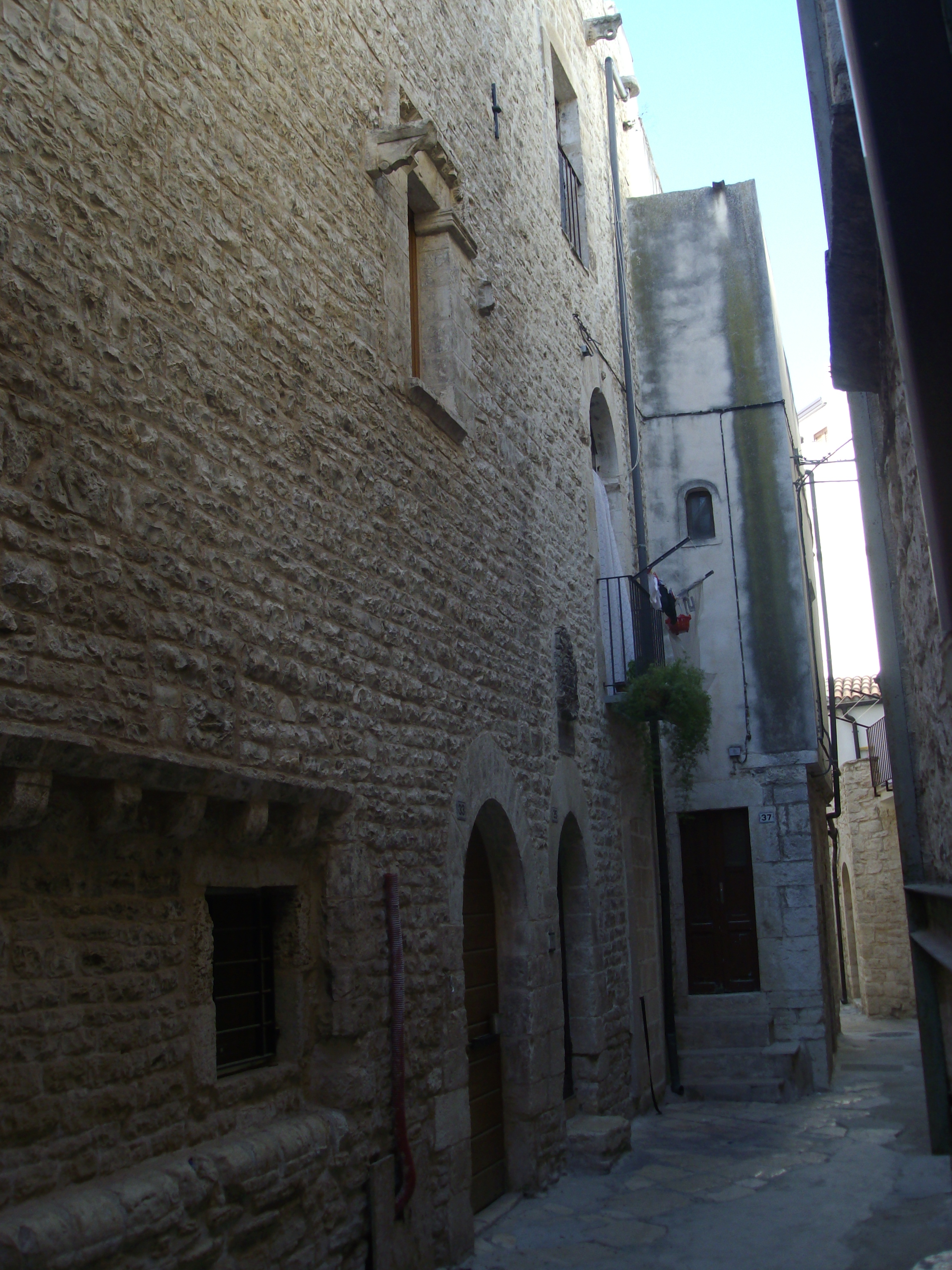
Eastern façade on Via San Antonio

The building is spread over three levels, and it is built around an internal courtyard, with two sides arranged at right angles overlooking the street.

It is located at the intersection between Via San Antonio and Via Leonese, with the latter containing the main façade. The main entrance includes an architrave with an ornate cornice, and it is located on the first floor so it is reachable by a staircase. An ornate mullioned window is found on the second floor. Two arched entrances are located on the ground floor of the eastern façade. The entire building has a service court at the back.

The windows have stone architraves decorated with interesting geometric patterns. The two mullioned windows on the top floor are of great value, and one of them contains two openings surmounted by an archivolt perforated with a diamond-shaped bezel.

== Bibliography ==
- Antonacci De Marco, Rosa (1993). Bitetto nell'età borbonica (in Italian). Bitetto: Tipolito Vitetum.
