= Villa Kallina =

Historic country house in Zagreb, Croatia

- Vila Kallina (in Croatian)
- Interactive map of the Villa Kallina area

General information
- Architectural style: Art Nouveau / Vienna Secession
- Location: Zagreb, Croatia
- Coordinates: 45.8395°N 15.975°E
- Completed: 1907

Design and construction
- Architect: Vjekoslav Bastl

Villa Kallina is a historic country house in Zagreb, Croatia built by Vjekoslav Bastl as the family residence for the wealthy industrialist Josip Kallina's son Gustav.

The Villa was constructed between 1906 and 1907 at Jandrićeva street in the area of Ksaver on what was then the outskirts of Zagreb, now in the Gornji Grad–Medveščak city district. Villa Kallina is considered a notable achievement of Croatian architecture in its own right, and the project was featured at the 1925 Exposition Internationale des Arts Décoratifs in Paris and the Half a Century of Croatian Art (Pola stoljeća hrvatske umjetnosti) exhibition held in 1938 at the Meštrović Pavilion.

The building is listed in the Croatian Ministry of Culture's Protected Cultural Heritage Registry (Registar zaštićenih kulturnih dobara) since September 2005.

Villa Kallina should not be confused with Kallina House, built by the same architect in another part of Zagreb.
