= Juraj Lovrov Zadranin =

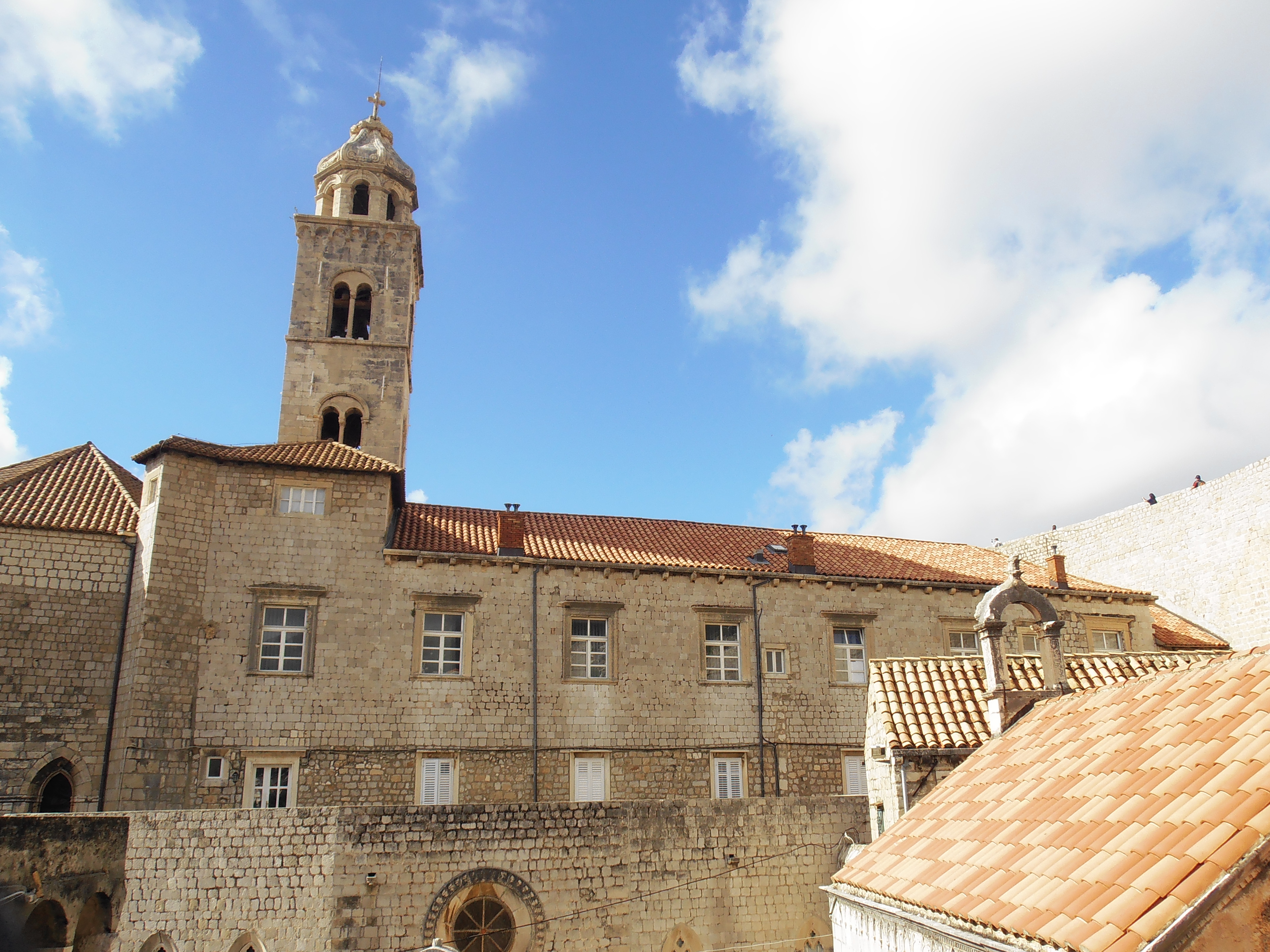
- Juraj Lovrov Zadranin's main work was the Dominican Monastery in Dubrovnik (pictured)
- Born: 13th century Zadar, Kingdom of Croatia in personal union with Hungary
- Died: 14th century
- Occupation: Architect
- Parent: Lovro Zadranin (father)
- Buildings: Dubrovnik Dominican Monastery

Juraj Lovrov Zadranin or Juraj Lovrin (transl. George, son of Laurence from Zadar; active during the fourteenth century) was a Croatian architect and builder, born in Zadar and mostly active in Dubrovnik.

He was a member of an architect family. His father Lovro /Laurence/ was a master builder in Zadar by the end of the thirteenth and the beginning of the fourteenth century. He had brothers Nikola /Nicholas/, Anđeo /Angel/ and Petar /Peter/, who all succeeded his father's business and expanded it.

At the beginning of the fourteenth century he settled in Dubrovnik and started his own business. In documents he is mentioned to have possessed a stonemasonry workshop in Dubrovnik in 1314. There he had an apprentice named Osroje Bogdanović from the Konavle region. His brother Nikola joined him in December 1316 and both of them obliged to work for the Dubrovnik Dominican Monastery, one of the most important architectural structures in the City of Dubrovnik, established in 1225 and completed in the fourteenth century. The brothers Juraj and Nikola built it in a simple Gothic architectural style.

While Juraj was active in Dubrovnik, his brothers Anđeo and Petar were later working as architects and builders in Dubrovnik and Kotor as well.

== See also ==
- List of Croatian architects
- List of people from Zadar
