= Bastl =

Bastl is a surname. Notable people with the surname include:

- George Bastl (born 1975), Swiss tennis player
- Vjekoslav Bastl (1872–1947), Croatian architect
