= Croatian Dominican Province =

Croatian Dominican Province of the Annunciation of the Blessed Virgin Mary
- Hrvatska dominikanska provincija Navještenja Blažene Djevice Marije
- Abbreviation: HDP
- Formation: 1380
- Location: Bosnia and Herzegovina, Croatia, Slovenia
- Provincial: Tomislav Kraljević, OP
- Website: dominikanci.hr

The Croatian Dominican Province of the Annunciation of the Blessed Virgin Mary (Croatian: Hrvatska dominikanska provincija Navještenja Blažene Djevice Marije) is a province of the Dominican Order, established in 1962 with a merger of Dalmatian Province, consisting of convents along Dalmatian coast and islands, and Congregation of Dubrovnik and convents in Gruž, with a house established in Zagreb in 1927. Today province consist of 13 convents and houses located in Croatia ten convents and houses, Slovenia two houses, and in Bosnia and Herzegovina one house.

== Order history in the region ==
=== Dominicans in medieval Bosnia ===
First mention of Dominicans presence in Bosnia is dated to 1233, while fewer information are actually known to researchers to this day. There, according to Dominican Stjepan Krasić, and historian expert on Dominican order activity in medieval Bosnia, Salih Jaliman, order established two monasteries, with locations, where these existed until 1241 and Mongols invasion, still unknown. It is known that order attempted to build a church somewhere in Vrhbosna, with exact location again unknown, but after a Mongolian invasion deep mistrust and discord started developing between Dominicans on one side and Bosnian medieval ruling elite and Bosnian Franciscans on the other. This lead Dominicans to decide to remove seat of Bosnian diocese from Bosnia altogether, and move it to Đakovo in Hungary, where it stayed until 1881. Until cca 1380 Province of Budapest had jurisdiction over activities in Bosnia, and since 1380 Province of Dalmatia, but all organized activities ceased already in the second half of the 13th century, giving a way to individual priests practices during the 14th and 15th century.

=== Hungarian Province ===
On the second General Chapter of the Order in 1221, Saint Dominic entrusted his associate Paul the Dalmatian to implant the Order in the Kingdom of Hungary-Croatia. In the Middle Ages the Dominicans spread to all Croatian areas. First they came in Dubrovnik in 1225 and at the beginning of the 14th century they began to build the monumental complex of the Convent and church of Saint Dominic. During the 13th century they established monasteries in Nin (1228), Čazma (1229), Dubica (1235), Zagreb (before 1241), Virovitica (before 1242), Zadar (1244), Split, Croatia (1245), Pag (c. 1250), Ulcinj (1258), Trogir (1265), Bihać (1266), Kotor (1266), Skradin (before 1312) and Brskovo (1285). In the 14th century several convents were established: Požega (1303), Hvar (1312), Šibenik (1346), Bosanska Krupa (before 1357) and Senj (before 1378) and Krk (before 1380). Until 1380 the Croatian convents were part of the Hungarian Province with vicars for the area along the Adriatic Sea.

=== Dalmatian Province ===
Pope Urban VI recognized complete autonomy of the Dalmatian Province in the bull Sedis Apostolicae of March 3, 1380. Newly erected Province of Dalmatia covered convents along the eastern Adriatic and had its headquarters in Zadar. During the 15th and 16th century numerous convents were established: Rab (1426), Čiovo (1432), Gruž (1437), Bol (1474), Rijeka (1477), Korčula (1501), Budva (1513) and others.

==== Dubrovnik Congregation ====
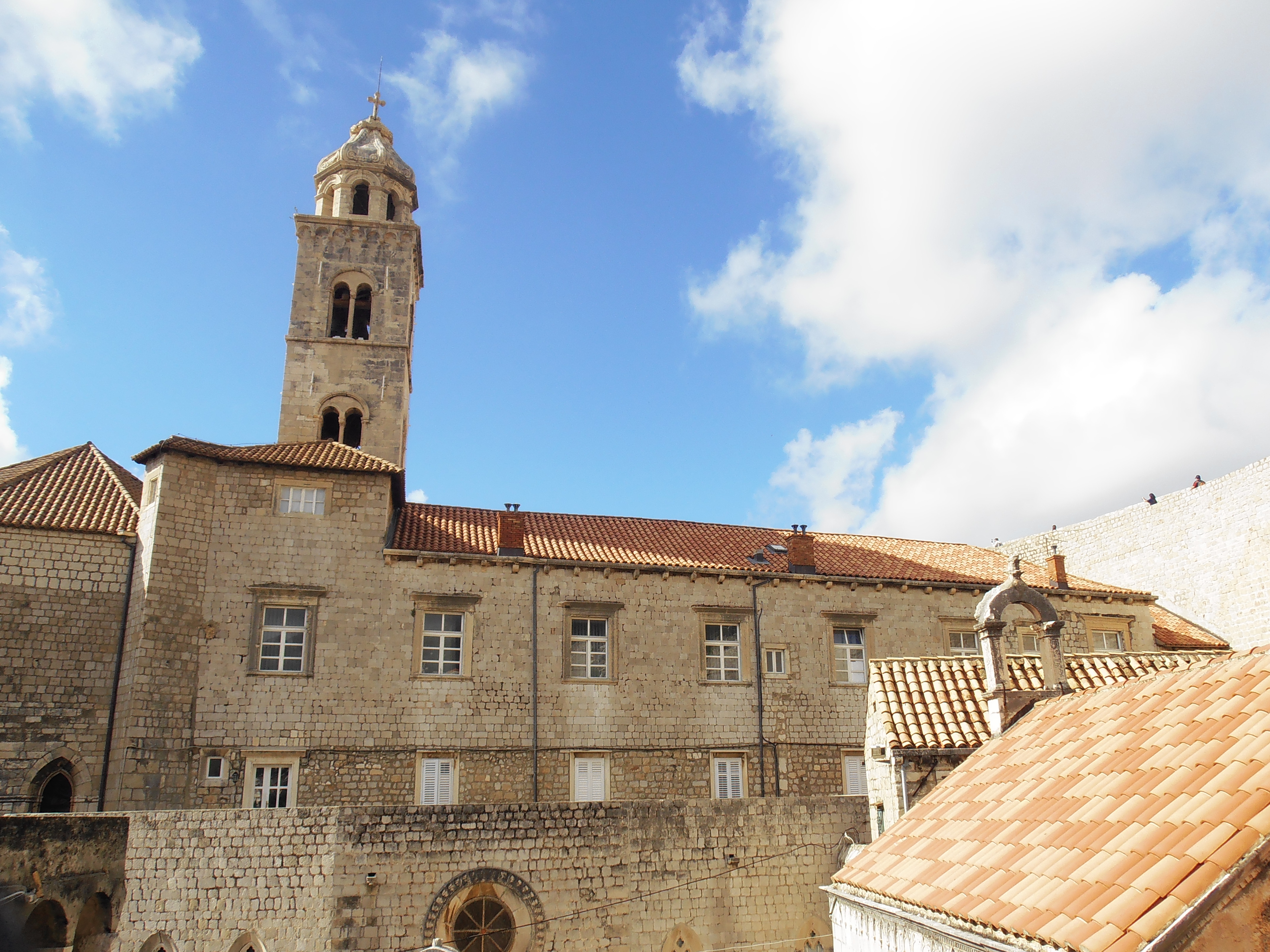
Dominican Priory in Dubrovnik (1225)

Following the process of reform in the Order, the reformed Congregation of Dubrovnik was founded in 1486, uniting three priories in the territory of the Republic of Ragusa: St. Dominic's Priory in Dubrovnik, Holy Cross Priory in Gruž and St. Nicholas' Priory in Lopud. Congregation spread with the foundation of new priories: on the island Ruda (1535), in Župa dubrovačka, Broci (1628), Viganj (1671) and Orašac (1690).

==== Congregation of Senj ====
Priories of Senj, Modruš and Bihać located on the territory of the Croatian-Hungarian Kingdom formed Congregation of Senj (Congregation of Croatia) in 1508, which, in some documents of the Order is also called the Province of Croatia. In these convents existed an effort to counter the impact from Dalmatia, which was under Venetian rule and thus had the support of the Hungarian king. Later the Congregation grew with the foundation of new priories: Trsat, Brinje, Kraljevica, Veruda and Gradišće. The majority of these priories were destroyed during the Ottoman invasion. The last time that mention is made of this Congregation is in 1585.

=== The rise and fall of the Dalmatian province ===
In the mid 15th century, the Province had about seventy convents and 2,000 members, but that number has started to decrease drastically due to the Ottoman invasion. Turkish raids in Bosnia, Slavonia, Lika and Dalmatia had destroyed almost completely the Dominican presence there. So in 1573 Dalmatian province had only a hundred members in eight convents. To 1583. number of convents increased to thirteen. During the 17th century the number of convents and members remained largely the same.

Since the Republic of Dubrovnik was spared of the Turkish conquest nor convents of the Dubrovnik congregation were not destroyed. Until the second half of the 17th century, the Congregation flourished and had seven convents, but after the devastating earthquake from 1667, the Congregation, because death of many members and significant material damage, experienced its decline.

Extensive damage to the Province inflicted the laws that Venetian Republic began to introduce during the 18th century and that restricted many of the rights of the religious orders. With the arrival of the French government in Dalmatia in the early 19th century, the state occupied and abolished many convents including that of Zadar, seat of the Province through the centuries and place where a university existed from 1389 until the abolishment of the convent in 1807. After Austria took over Dalmatia in 1814 situation insignificantly improves. Province in 1833 had had only six convents and 21 members.

Since the Dubrovnik congregation was threatened with extinction, with only 10 members in several rooms in two occupied convents (Dubrovnik and Gruž), the unification of the Congregation with the Dalmatian province was decided in 1835. The seat of the Province is then moved to Dubrovnik.

== Croatian Dominican province ==
Province began to reestablish after the First World War, and in 1927 Zagreb convent was founded. The house in Subotica followed in 1945, and in 1951 the convent in Rijeka. Since 1967, with a spread of the order beyond Croatia proper into other areas with Croatian population present, province rejected the regional names and began calling itself the Croatian Dominican province. Moving beyond the Croatian borders began in 1967 with a foundation of the house at Žalec in Slovenia, followed with a house in Klopče in Bosnia and Herzegovina in 1978, and another house in Slovenia in 1986 in Petrovče village.

== Convents ==
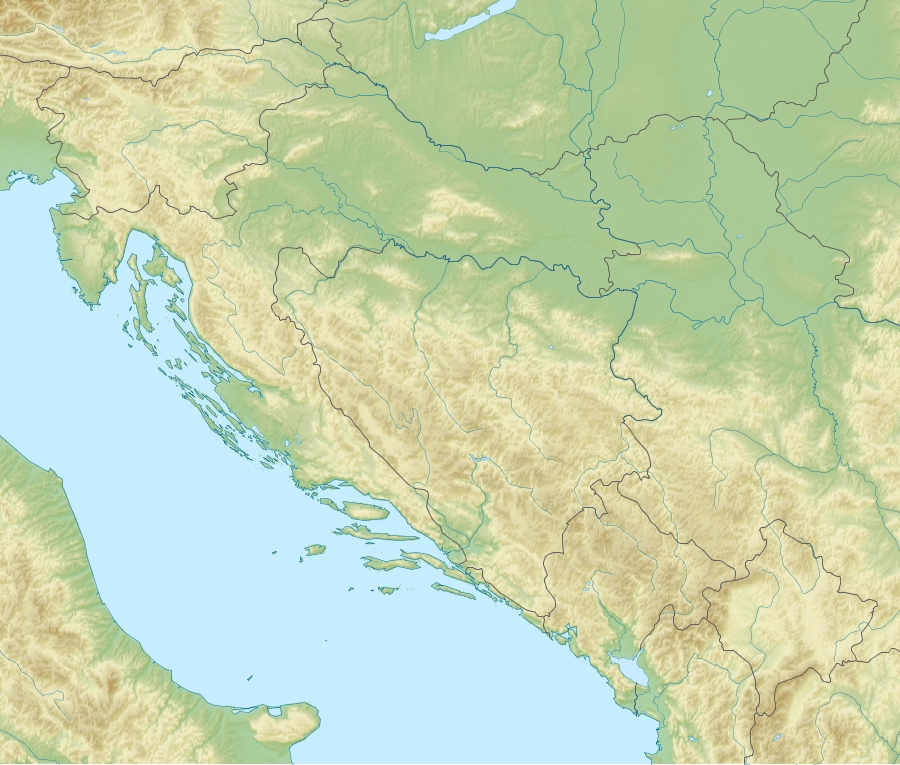
Convents

| Convent | Location | Established |
|---|---|---|
| St. Dominic's Priory | Dubrovnik | 1225 |
| St. Catherine's Priory | Split | 1245 |
| St. Dominic's Convent | Trogir | 1265 |
| Holy Cross Convent | Gruž, Dubrovnik | 1437 |
| Our Lady of Graces Convent | Bol | 1474 |
| St. Peter Martyr's Convent | Stari Grad, Hvar | 1481 |
| St. Nicholas' Convent | Korčula | 1501 |
| Our Lady of the Rosary Priory | Maksimir, Zagreb | 1927 |
| St. Jerome's Convent | Rijeka | 1951 |
| St. Joseph's Convent | Žalec, Slovenia | 1965 |
| Our Lady Convent | Petrovče, Slovenia | 1975 |
| Bl. Augustine's Convent | Klopče, Zenica | 1978 |
| Bl. Augustine's Priory | Peščenica – Žitnjak, Zagreb | 2001 |

=== Former convents ===
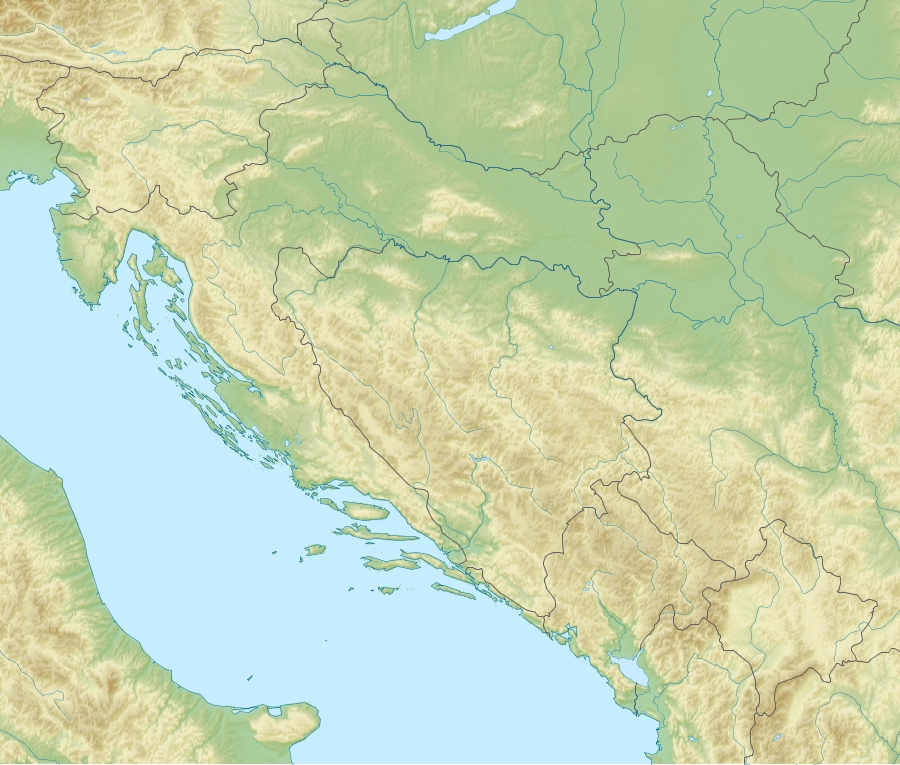
Former convents

Incomplete list of former convents of the Croatian Dominican Province:

| Convent | Location | Established | Abolished | Notes |
|---|---|---|---|---|
| | Nin | 1228 | after 1646 | |
| | Čazma | 1229 | 1552 | |
| | Ptuj | 1230 | 18th century | |
| | Vrhbosna | 1233 | 1242 | Dominican friar Ponsa, Bishop of Bosnia, had built cathedral of Saint Peter in Vrhbosna between 1238 and 1244. |
| St. Nicholas Convent | Dubica | 1235 | 15th century | |
| | Virovitica | 1242 | 1553 | |
| St. Dominic's Convent | Zadar | 1244 | 1807 | The University of Zadar, the first university in Croatia, was founded in 1396 in the St. Dominic's Convent. |
| | Pag | c 1250 | after 1646 | |
| Saint Anthony's Convent | Bihać | before 1266 | 1578 | In the late 16th century when the Ottomans conquered Bihać, the Saint Anthony's church was converted into a mosque (Fethija). |
| | Požega | before 1303 | 1529 | |
| St. Mark's Convent | Hvar | 1313 | 1806 | St. Mark's church was the seat of the Great Council, therefore, noble families had there their tombs and altars. |
| St. Dominic's Convent | Šibenik | 1346 | 1974 | |
| | Gorjani | before 1347 | 16th century | |
| | Otoka kod Krupe (Bosanska Otoka) | 1357 | 15th century | |
| | Rab | before 1380 | before 1613 | |
| | Brinje | 1520 | 16th century | |
| | Subotica | 1945 | 1948 | |

== Notable Croatian Dominicans ==
- Bl. Augustin Kažotić (c. 1260-1323), Bishop of Zagreb and Lucera
- John of Ragusa (c. 1380-1443), theologian
- Vinko Pribojević (mid-15th century - after 1532), historian and ideologue
- Ambroz Ranjina (1490-1550), first Croatian biographer
- Serafin Crijević (1696-1759), historian and encyclopedist, author of the first encyclopedia of the Dalmatian language (Ragusan Library)
- Stjepan Krasić (1938), historian, significant for his discoveries substantial for the history of Croatian education and linguistics
