= Kockica =

- Zgrada ministarstava (Ministry Building)
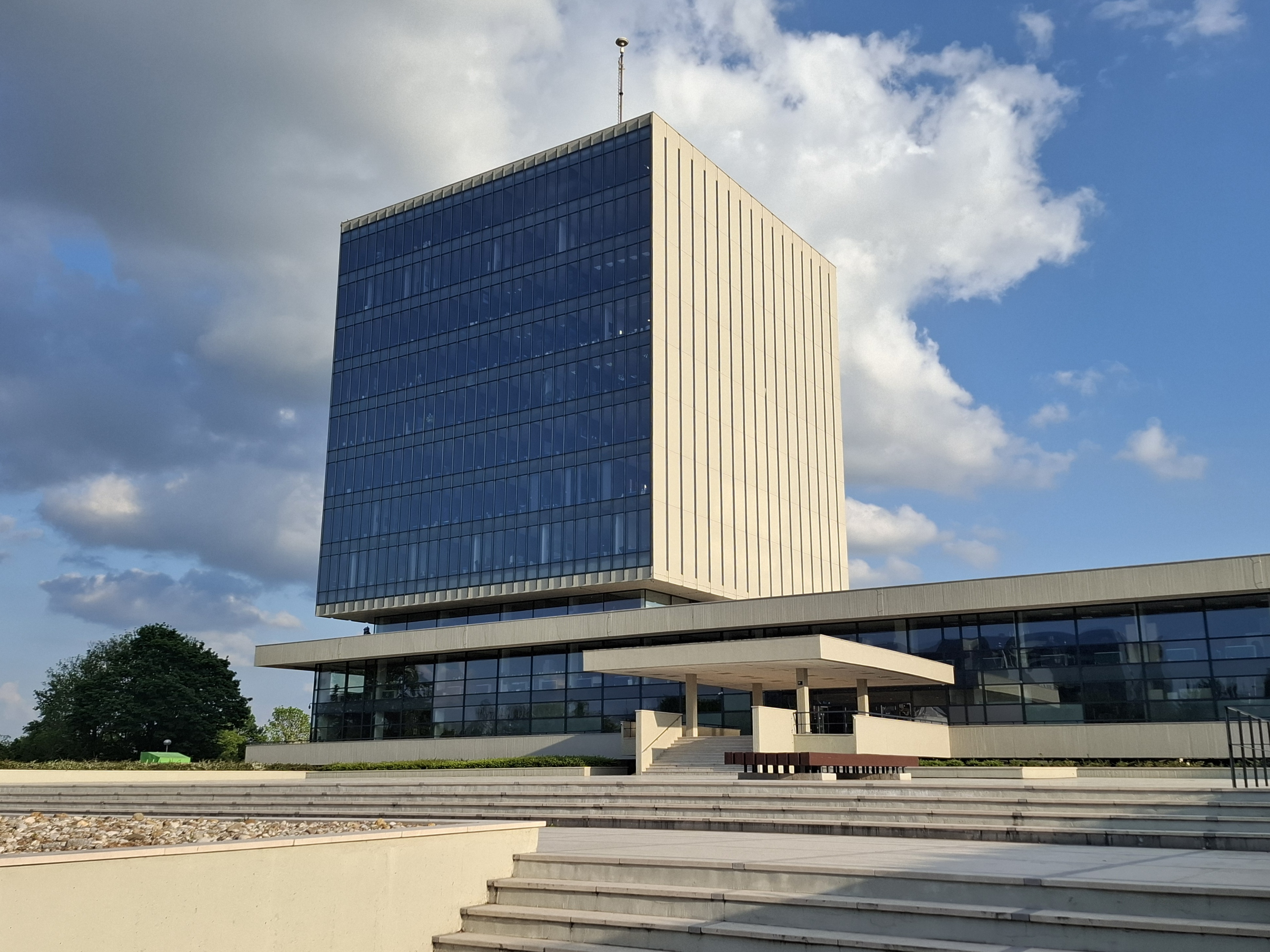
- Kockica in 2025, as seen from the northwest.
- Interactive map of the Kockica area

General information
- Status: Completed
- Architectural style: Modernism
- Location: Zagreb, Prisavlje 14
- Coordinates: 45°47′26.4″N 15°58′07.8″E
- Construction started: 1963
- Completed: 1968
- Opened: 1968
- Landlord: The Government of the Republic of Croatia

Height
- Height: roof 50 m (164 ft)

Technical details
- Floor count: 10
- Floor area: 14,500 m^{2} (156,000 sq ft)

Design and construction
- Architect: Ivan Vitić
- Main contractor: European Construction

Kockica (a diminutive form of "kocka", Croatian for "dice" or "little cube") is a 10-story mixed-use building located at Prisavlje 14 in Zagreb, the capital of Croatia. It was originally built to house the Central Committee of the League of Communists of Croatia and currently serves as the headquarters of Ministry of Maritime Affairs, Transport and Infrastructure and Ministry of Tourism of Croatia. Croatian architect Ivan Vitić planned the building, the construction of which began in 1963. However, the construction was delayed because of the 1964 Zagreb flood, and the building was finished in 1968.

== History ==
In 1961, the government of Croatia announced a tender for a new building to house the Central Committee of the League of Communists of Croatia. A first prize was not awarded; instead, two-second prizes were awarded. Ivan Vitić's design received the "first second" prize, while Boris Čipan and Petar Muličkovski from Skopje obtained the "second second" prize. The construction only began in 1963, as the building-to-be was located on undeveloped ground near the Sava river. The construction site was flooded in 1964, possibly inspiring Kockica's tall mezzanine. The building was completed in 1968. Because of its cubic shape, the citizens of Zagreb took to calling it the "little cube".

The Building was originally conceived as the third part of a complex, which was supposed to include a large conference hall (which would be a similar hall for the UN skyscraper). However, costs and overruns meant that part of the project has never been realized, though traces can still be seen today in form of the bridge supports designed to connect the hall with the main building.

Despite the bland outside appearance, the building's interior was richly decorated by the artists of the era. Raoul Goldoni coordinated the effort and contributed artworks in glass, Jagoda Buić created the tapestry, while Stevan Luketić made the metal relief. The building also features mosaics by Zlatko Prica, wall paintings by Edo Murtić and at one time was home to a metal tapestry by Dušan Džamonja, which was stolen in the tumult of the 1990s. The building is protected as cultural heritage of the Republic of Croatia.

The building went through a major renovation between 2017 and 2020, fixing all major damage as well as upgrading its energy efficiency.

The Zagreb Tourist Board organizes free tours of Kockica with professional guides.

== See also ==
- Architecture of Croatia
