= Dubrovnik International University =

Coordinates: 42.6416°N 18.1111°E

Libertas University
- Motto: Education today for success tomorrow
- Type: Private
- Established: 2008
- Rector: Prof. Ivo Andrijanić, PhD
- Location: Trg J. F. Kennedya 6 b, Zagreb, Croatia
- Website: www.libertas.hr

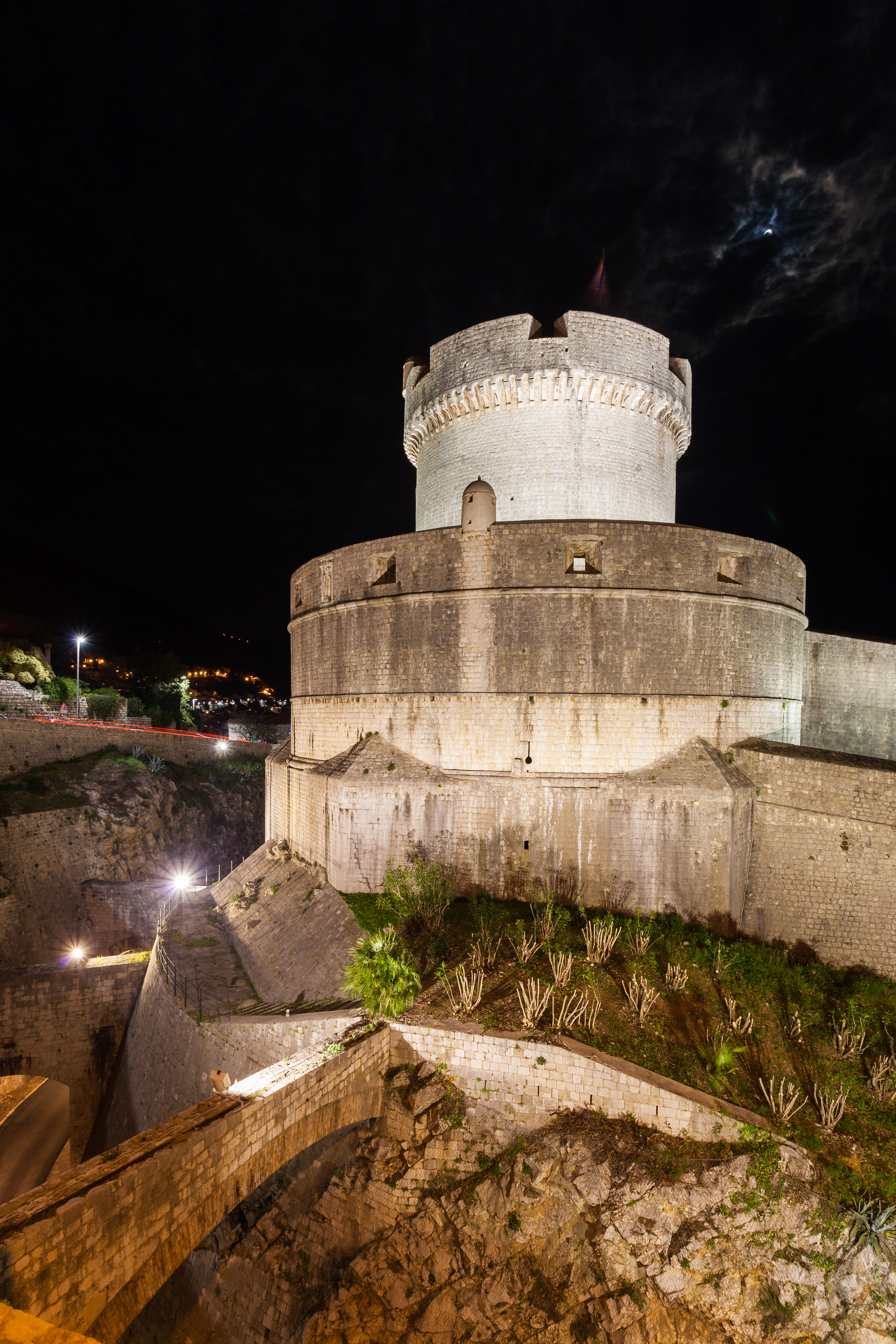
Dominican monastery in Dubrovnik.

Libertas University, formerly known as Dubrovnik International University (DIU) (DIU Libertas, or DIU Libertas International University) is a private university established in 2008 under the auspices of the United Nations Alliance of Civilizations and in conjunction with both Croatian and American institutions. It is located within the Dominican Monastery in Dubrovnik, Croatia and is the first private university in the Republic of Croatia. DIU maintains three schools: the Dubrovnik School of Diplomacy, the Dubrovnik School of International Business and the Dubrovnik School of Arts and Humanities. Classes are taught primarily in English, which facilitates the enrollment of both Croatian and foreign students.

== Programs ==
DIU offers three undergraduate programs, a Bachelor of Arts in International Relations & Diplomacy, which is the first of its kind in the Republic of Croatia, and a Bachelor of Arts in International Business & Economics. All of DIU's undergraduate academic programs consists of six semesters over the course of a three-year period.

The Dubrovnik School of Diplomacy also offers Master of Arts Program in International Relations and Diplomacy. All of the programs adhere to the Bologna process. Students receive either 180 or 300 points under the European Credit Transfer System (ECTS) upon graduation, which would allow them to continue their education abroad. Additionally, DIU offers exchange programs based on cooperative agreements with other universities and institutions.

== The Dubrovnik School of Diplomacy ==
The Dubrovnik School of Diplomacy offers both undergraduate and graduate programs, respectively culminating in BA or an MA in International Relations & Diplomacy. Students focus on topics of international affairs, including globalization, international organizations, conflict resolution, international law and global governance. Skills-based classes designed to prepare students for the professional world are also an important element of the programs, requirements ranging from courses in writing and communication skills to statistics and research methodologies. Available career paths for alumni of the Dubrovnik School of Diplomacy include working for state administration, the foreign affairs, international organizations, the non profit sector as well as the private sector. The Dean of the Dubrovnik School of Diplomacy is Ambassador Thomas Melady, a diplomat and academic from the United States.

Operating under a joint partnership, Dubrovnik International University, and the University of Zadar are the first institutions to offer a Master of Arts linking several academic disciplines related to International Relations and Diplomacy. Graduate students can attend courses either at DIU or at the University of Zadar. Students will be able to choose a faculty member to serve as their dissertation mentor from either university's faculties.

The MA in International Relations and Diplomacy has four separate concentrations:

1. International Relations and Diplomacy: The concentration in International Relations and Diplomacy focuses on preparing students to be practitioners and analysts of foreign affairs and diplomacy in the global environment. Courses focuses on politics, international and national legal systems, security studies and current international affairs ranging from economic to ecological considerations.

2. Commercial Diplomacy: This concentration explores the connection between international institutions and global economics by looking at the role of international business and financial organizations in shaping transnational networks, global politics, conflict, and development.

3. The European Union: This concentration is designed to expand the understanding of how Europe has reached its current position, explain what structures, policies, laws and regulations form the EU, and examine how the contemporary politics of the EU - its institutional architecture, party politics, contested legitimacy, and ambiguous identity - will shape its future.

== Dubrovnik School of International Business ==
The Dubrovnik School of International Business and Economics undergraduate program focuses on economics, management, accounting, and international law. Students are required to complete an internship. The Dean of the Dubrovnik School of International Business is Dr. Michael Gary O'Callaghan, advisor, representative and economist at the International Monetary Fund and macroeconomic advisor for USAID.

== Professors and staff ==
DIU employs a group of international scholars and academics who teach at the university on a permanent basis and hosts visiting professors and lecturers each semester.

DIU’s community of international scholars includes professors that have taught at Harvard University, Princeton University, London School of Economics, University of Paris, New York University, University of Virginia Law School, and many other educational institutions in Europe and the United States. Former First Minister of Scotland, Jack McConnell, has taught several classes at the school as a visiting professor.

Full-time faculty :

- Ambassador Miomir Zuzul, Ph.D.
- Janice McCormick, Ph.D.
- Margaret Melady, Ph.D.
- Ambassador Thomas Melady, professor emeritus
- Michael Gary O'Callaghan, Ph.D.
- Damir Mladic, Ph.D.
- Ambassador Dr.iur. Christof Maria Fritzen
- Stjepan Krasić, professor emeritus
- Ambassador Zoran Jašić, Ph.D.

== Facilities ==
The university has four classrooms and several offices for staff and professors located on a one floor of a wing of an ancient monastery.

== See also ==
- List of universities in Croatia
- Education in Croatia
