= Anđeo Lovrov Zadranin =

Croatian architect

- Born: Zadar
- Occupation: Architect

Anđeo Lovrov Zadranin or Anđeo Lovrin (active during the fourteenth century) was a Croatian architect, born in Zadar and mostly active in Dubrovnik.

He was a member of an architect family from Zadar. He had brothers Nikola, Juraj and Petar, who were also architects or builders.

He is mentioned in documents between 1339 and 1368. From 1348 he works on the St. Blaise's Church and the Franciscan Church and Monastery in Dubrovnik. After that, he left for Kotor, where he had a stonemasonry workshop.

== Literature ==
- Cvito Fisković: Zadarski majstori u Dubrovniku tokom 14. stoljeća, Anali, Dubrovnik, 1953.
- Cvito Fisković: Prvi poznati dubrovački graditelji, JAZU, Dubrovnik, 1955.
- Cvito Fisković: Zadarski srednjovječni majstori, MH, Split, 1959.

== See also ==
- List of Croatian architects
- List of people from Zadar
