= Vicko Andrić =

Croatian architect

- Born: March 23, 1793; Trogir, Habsburg monarchy
- Died: January 15, 1866 (aged 72); Split, Austrian Empire
- Occupation: Architect
- Buildings: Archaeological museum on the east side of Diocletian's Palace (demolished); Round Pavilion in Sustipan; Belfry Gospe od Zdravlja

Vicko Andrić (March 23, 1793 – January 15, 1866) was a Croatian architect.

== Early life and education ==
The architect and renovator Vicko Andrić was born in Trogir on March 23, 1793. His family, father Josip and mother Antica were inhabitants of Split temporarily residing in Trogir. 10 years after his birth the family returned to Split. From 1803 to 1807 Andrić attended the Archdiocesan Seminary gymnasium in Split.

From Fall 1807 to 1810 Vicko Andrić attended the Zadar lyceum (Italian: Liceo di Zara, Croatian: Zadarski licej). His professor of architecture and technical drawing was the famous Italian architect Basilio Mazzoni. In 1811 Andrić enrolled the Illyrium high school. At the same time he attended a law school and a technical drawing class. However, he soon gave up the law school, for, according to his words, "love toward beautiful art."

== Study in Rome ==
In 1812, Vicko Andrić went to study in Rome, Italy. He enrolled the Faculty of Mathematics at the Sapienza University and the Accademia San Luca. By studying mathematics he attained the diploma of an expert surveyor. On Accademia San Luca he continued his education and practice again under the supervision of Mazzoni, who came to Rome the same year as Andrić due to the closing of Zadar lyceum. At the time, the honorary president of the academy was the sculptor Antonio Canova. Under Mazzoni's surveillance Andrić attained the status of an architect in 1816.

On the basis of diplomas received, Vicko Andrić was licensed for architectural works and measurement. During his stay in Rome, he was also involved in the research and preservation of buildings dating back to Ancient Rome. Carlo Fea, an expert on the Ancient Rome and the "president of Roman antiquities," helped Andrić at the start of Andrić's career. Andrić was deeply influenced by Fea's book Sacral and profane buildings.

Andrić's four years long stay in Rome was crucial not only for his education, but also for his commitment to classicism and fascination by the antique period, which he later used in studying and preserving the Diocletian's Palace in Split.

In Rome, Andrić projected several important concept designs: an inn (1814), a triumphal arc for the Austrian emperor Francis II (1815), a circular temple and a cathedral in the form of a Greek cross for a large city with a capitol and a seminary (both projects also in 1815) and a concept design of a casino and theater in Split (1816).

== Return to Split ==
After finishing his education in Rome, Vicko Andrić returned to Split in 1817. At the end of that year he was chosen to be a "temporary imperial royal district engineer." Soon after taking over this duty, he oversaw the Splitian completion of the lazaretto adaption, designing the whole Split harbor from the lazaretto up to the church of St. Francis, estimating the costs of renovating the coast and piers and building new bollards. A selection of Andrić's work in Split contains the technical snapshots of the construction complex of the former Communal and Principal Palace, of the main square in Split, and of the fortress in Gripe district, and projects of a suburban cemetery on Sustipan and a new building of the marine Health Office.

== Completed projects ==
The only notable finished projects of Andrić in Split are the building of the Museum of Archeology next to the eastern wall of Diocletian's Palace (built in 1821, later demolished), cemetery and a circular pavilion on Sustipan (1823–26) and the tower of the Church of the Lady of Health (built in 1846).

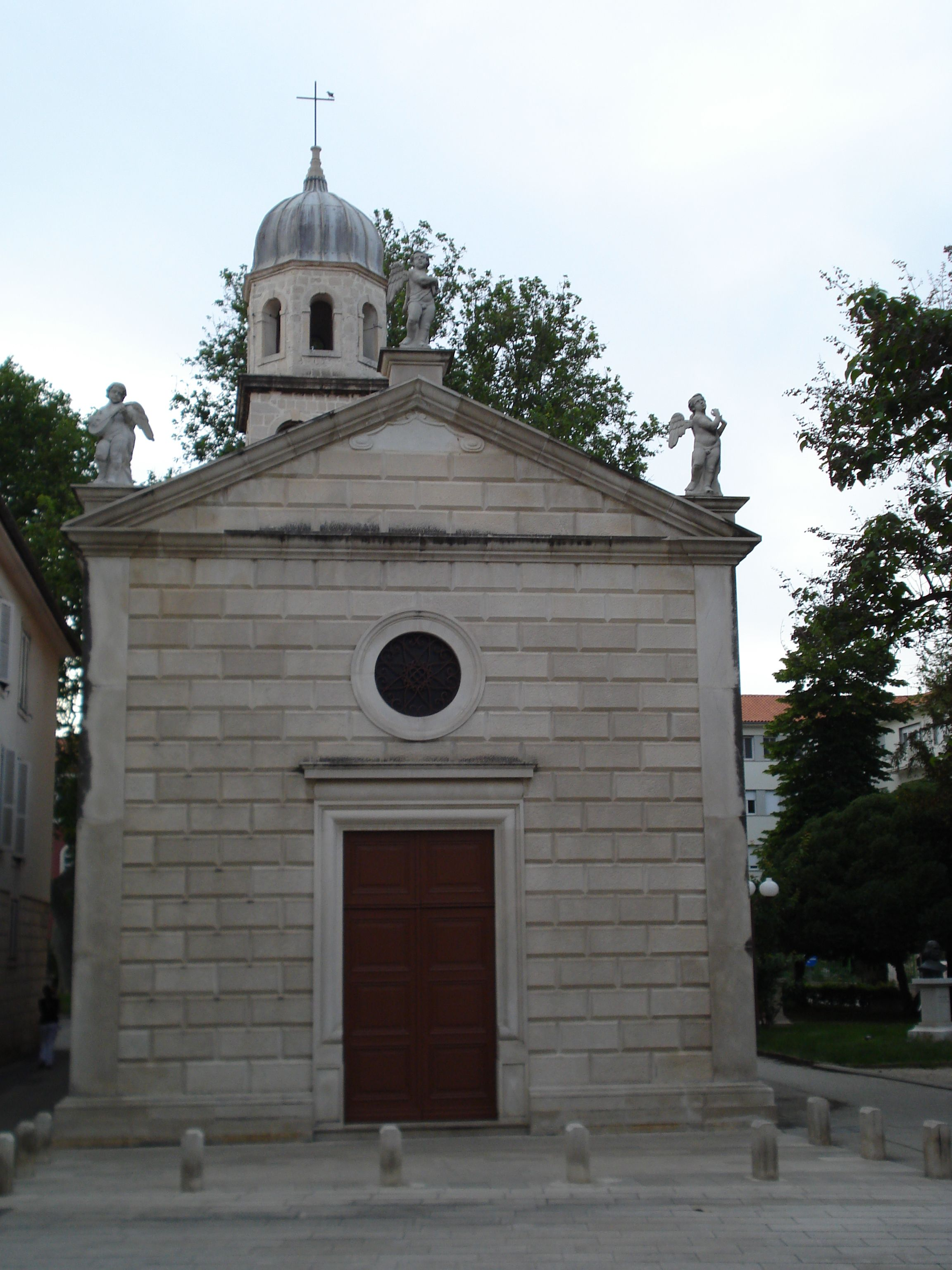
Belfry from the church in Zadar

== Work in the Dalmatian Directorate of Public Construction ==
Although he had an architect's and surveyor's diploma, he was generally given geodetic work. After being appointed an engineer in the Directorate of Public Construction in Dalmatia, from 1824 to 1828 he mainly worked reclaiming wetlands in the Dalmatian hinterland, renovating and constructing roads, bridges, wells and fountains. During 1828 and 1829 he led the work on the river Krka and the Botišnici creek in Knin. According to architectural records while there he also worked on a project restoring a church and parish hall in Vrpolje. Around the year 1830 he worked on a project for the Orthodox in the episcopate of Šibenik, and also led work on the court building in Skradin and the parish office in Ervenik.

Due to continuously living on site and the difficult working conditions, Vicko Andrić become ill. In 1833 he was appointed a regular pension by decision of the Royal Commission.

== Conservation work ==
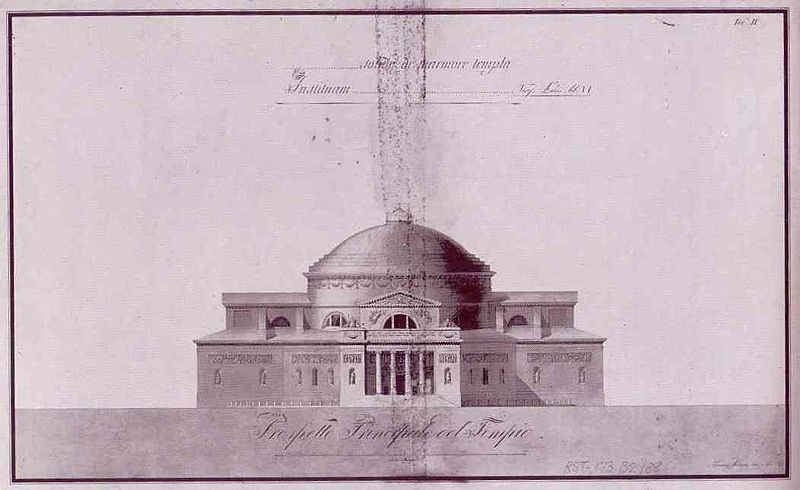
Split Cathedral (1815.)

Vicko Andrić was the first Croatian conservator. He was already showing a great interest in antiquities while studying in Rome. On his return to Split he became actively involved in researching and protecting Salona and Diocletian's Palace. After the emperor Francis I's visit to Split and Salona in the spring of 1818, the emperor came to a decision about the conservation of Diocletian's Palace and the excavations in Salona. By 1820 the government had already issued a decree ordering that Vicko Andrić supervised the excavation of antiquities. Andrić became one of the first to make a topographic and archeological map of Salona. After his retirement in 1833 he devoted himself entirely to the preservation and restoration of Diocletian's Palace.

In 1853, he was named „Conservator for counties of Zadar and Split“. Together with the artist Dujam Marcocchio he made plans for the restoration of the cathedral and recorded the remains of the palace, including the parts of ground halls in the southern part of the complex. He was carried away with the thought of completely stripping the palace of later buildings and reconstructing it according to the original plans. By this, he works on three projects from 1845. that were never brought to life:

- Reparation of the Diocletian's water system
- Cleansing of the southern facade and the basement
- Isolating it from the recent construction activity, restoring the Diocletian's mausoleum and erecting a new cathedral

The most interesting and ambitious project of all was the ordination from 1857 that would've been applied to the southern part of the palace, which envisions cleaning and the restoration of the original late antique facade but also an upgrade with a three-storey object that would stretch along the facade serving as a hotel.

As the main conservator, Vicko Andrić monitored the undergoing restoration works on the Šibenik Cathedral in 1854. On the same year, he was awarded the highest decoration of Emperor's Franz Joseph knight cross. He eventually withdrew from the conservation duty in 1864 when he was 70 years old.

Vicko Andrić died in Split on January 15, 1866, and was buried in the group tomb of St Anthony.

== See also ==
- Architecture of Croatia
- List of Croatian architects
