= Kallina House =

House in Zagreb, Croatia

- Kuća Kallina (in Croatian)
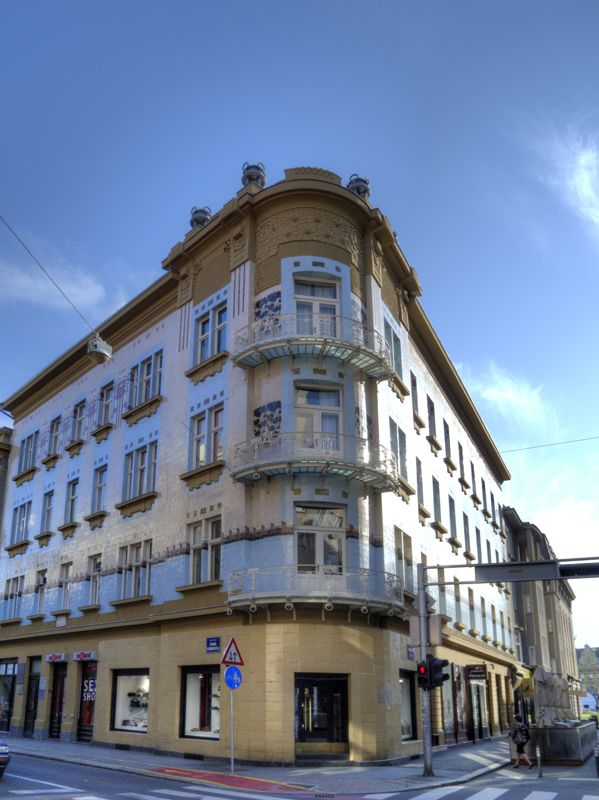
- Facade
- Interactive map of the Kallina House area

General information
- Architectural style: Art Nouveau / Vienna Secession
- Location: Zagreb, Croatia
- Coordinates: 45°48′37″N 15°58′19″E
- Completed: 1904; 122 years ago

Technical details
- Floor count: 4

Design and construction
- Architect: Vjekoslav Bastl

The Kallina House (Croatian: Kuća Kallina) is a historic residential building in Zagreb, Croatia. The house is located in the city centre on the corner of Masarykova and Gundulićeva streets and is regarded as "one of the finest examples of Secessionist-style street architecture in Zagreb."

The house was built between 1903 and 1904 for the wealthy industrialist Josip Kallina and was designed by the Croatian architect Vjekoslav Bastl for the Hönigsberg & Deutsch architecture bureau. Bastl had previously studied at the Akademie der Bildenden Künste in Vienna, where he was influenced by the Austrian architect Otto Wagner, an early proponent of Art Nouveau (called Jugendstil in Austria-Hungary) and one of the founding members of the Vienna Secession art movement.

The three-story house was designed as a residential building, with the exception of the ground level which was intended to house shops. Bastl's design for a house entirely covered in decorative ceramic tiles was at the same time inspired by the Majolika Haus in Vienna (built by Wagner in 1898, itself covered in ceramic tiling) and a way of turning the building into a giant advertisement for Josip Kallina's ceramics company (all the tiles used for the house were produced by his factory). The building features decorative iron balconies overlooking the street intersection, depictions of floral and geometric motifs typical for the Art Nouveau style of the period, and a bat-shaped patterned motif around the first floor façade.

Although many of Bastl's other projects in Lower Town are considered notable examples of the conservative Central European historicism, he allowed freer designs when working on private houses and villas, and the Kallina House today is today described as "one of the most consistent example of the way Secessionist architecture sought to redesign urban dwellings and break from conventional aesthetics."

The building is listed in the Croatian Ministry of Culture's Protected Cultural Heritage Registry (Registar zaštićenih kulturnih dobara) since January 2004.

Kallina House should not be confused with Villa Kallina, a country house built by the same architect in another part of the city.

== Gallery ==
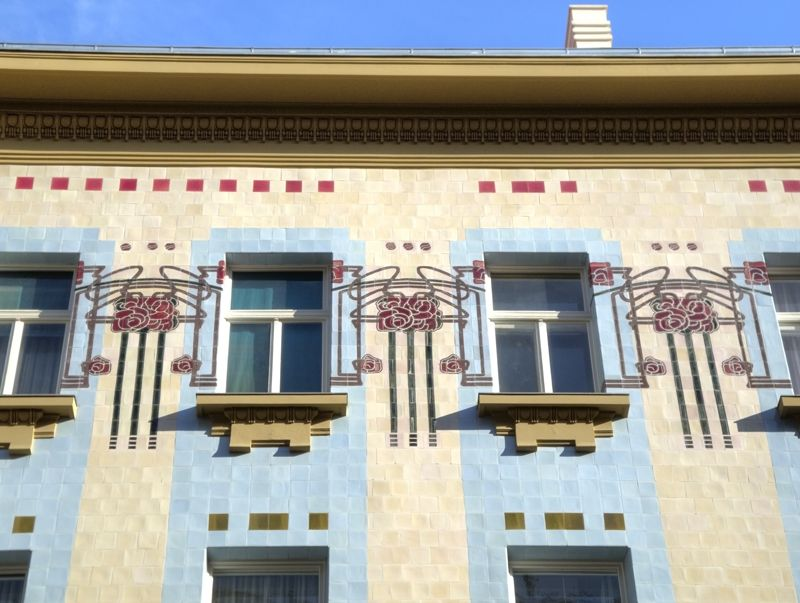
Facade details

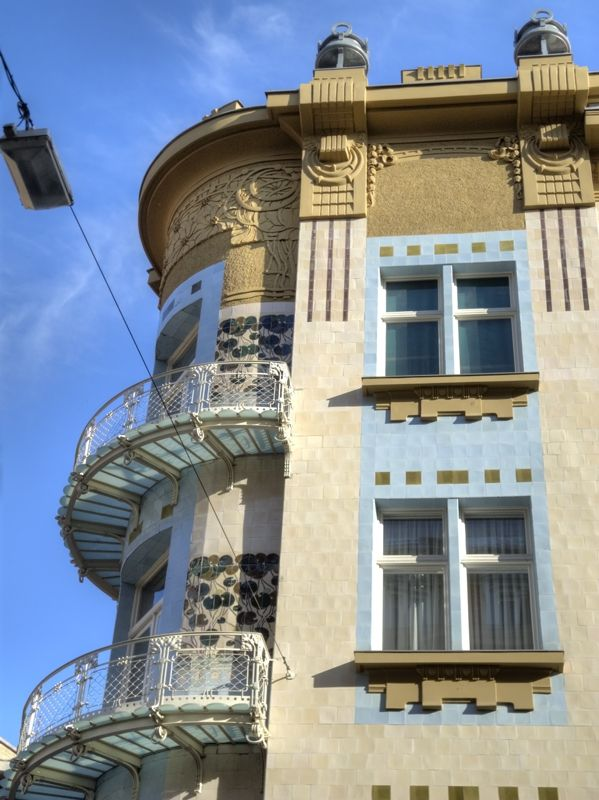
Balcons

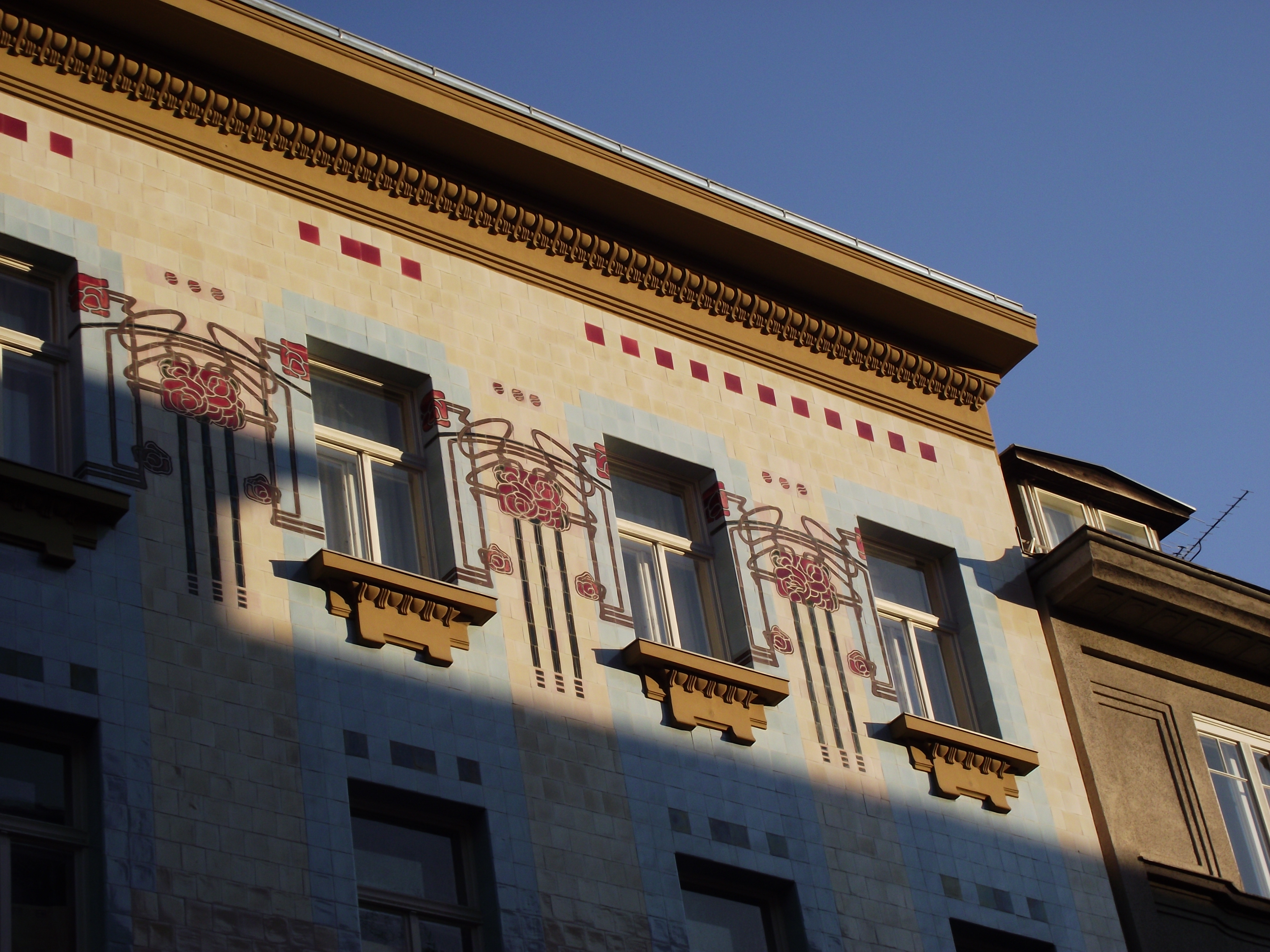
Another facade details

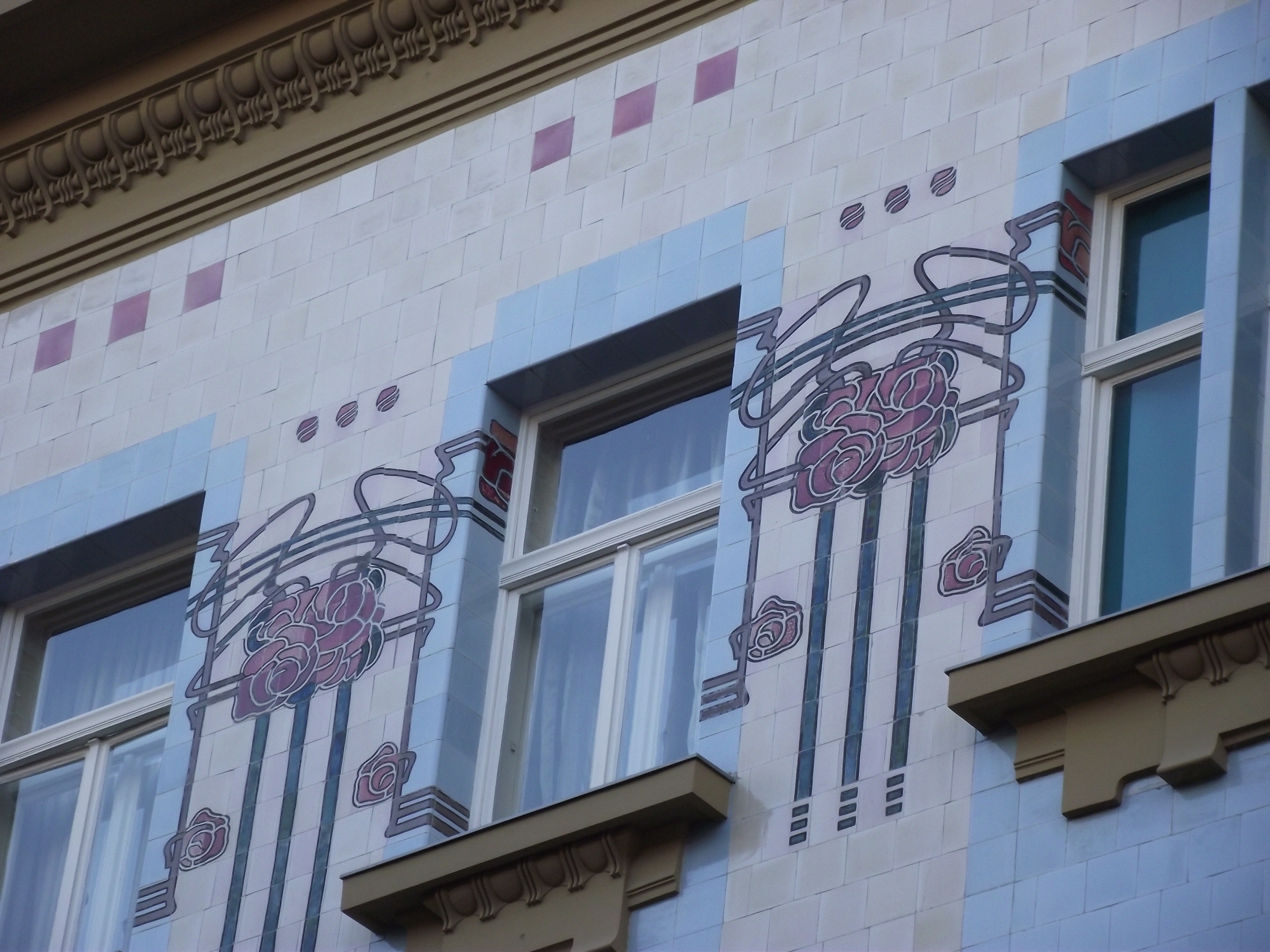
Windows

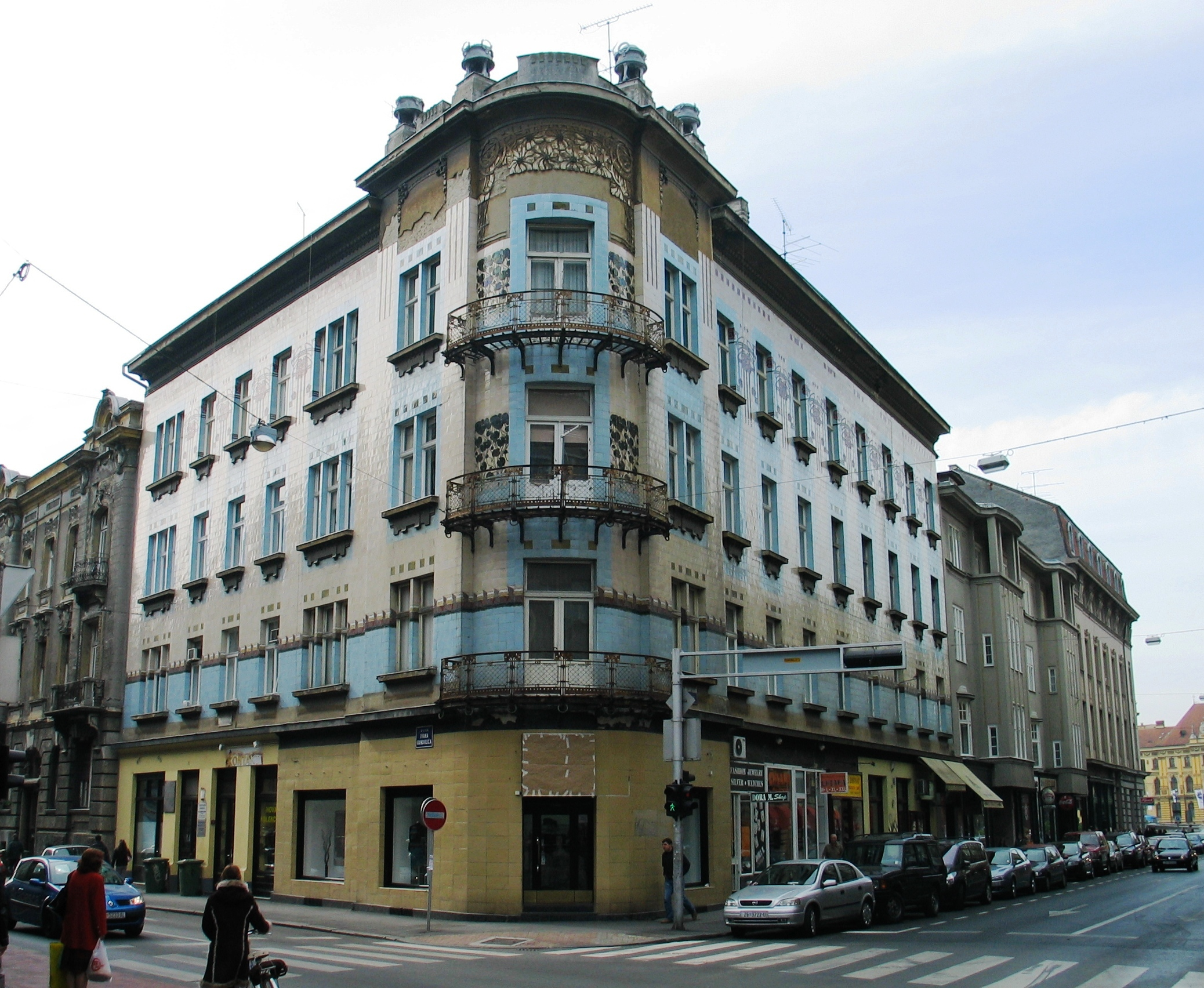
View of the building on corner of Masarykova & Gundulić Street

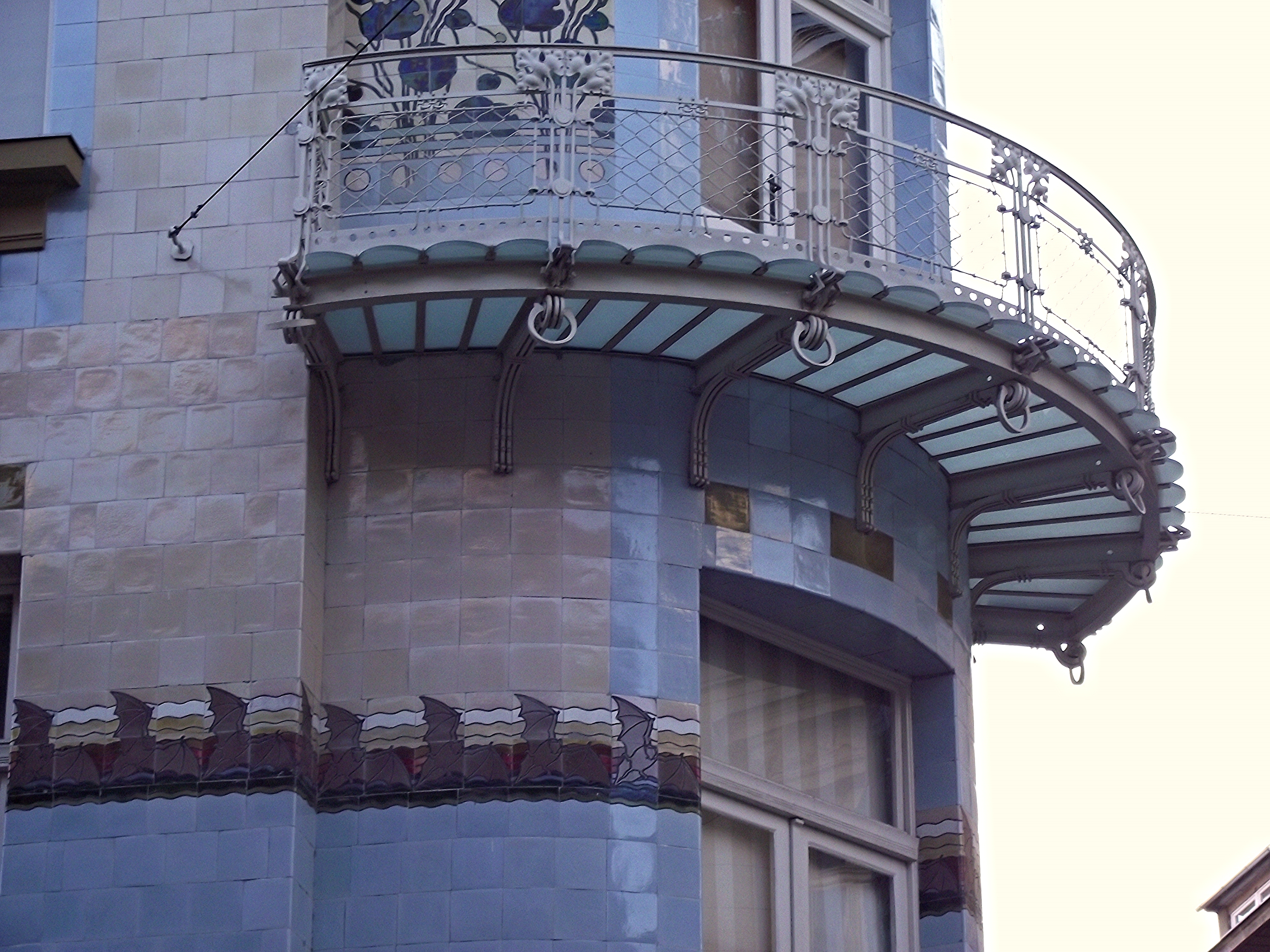
Balcon details
