= Ivan Vitić =

Croatian architect

- Born: 21 February 1917; Šibenik, Austria-Hungary
- Died: 21 December 1986 (aged 69); Zagreb, SFR Yugoslavia

Ivan Vitić (1917–1986) was a Croatian architect important to the development of Architectural Modernism in Yugoslavia.

== Life ==
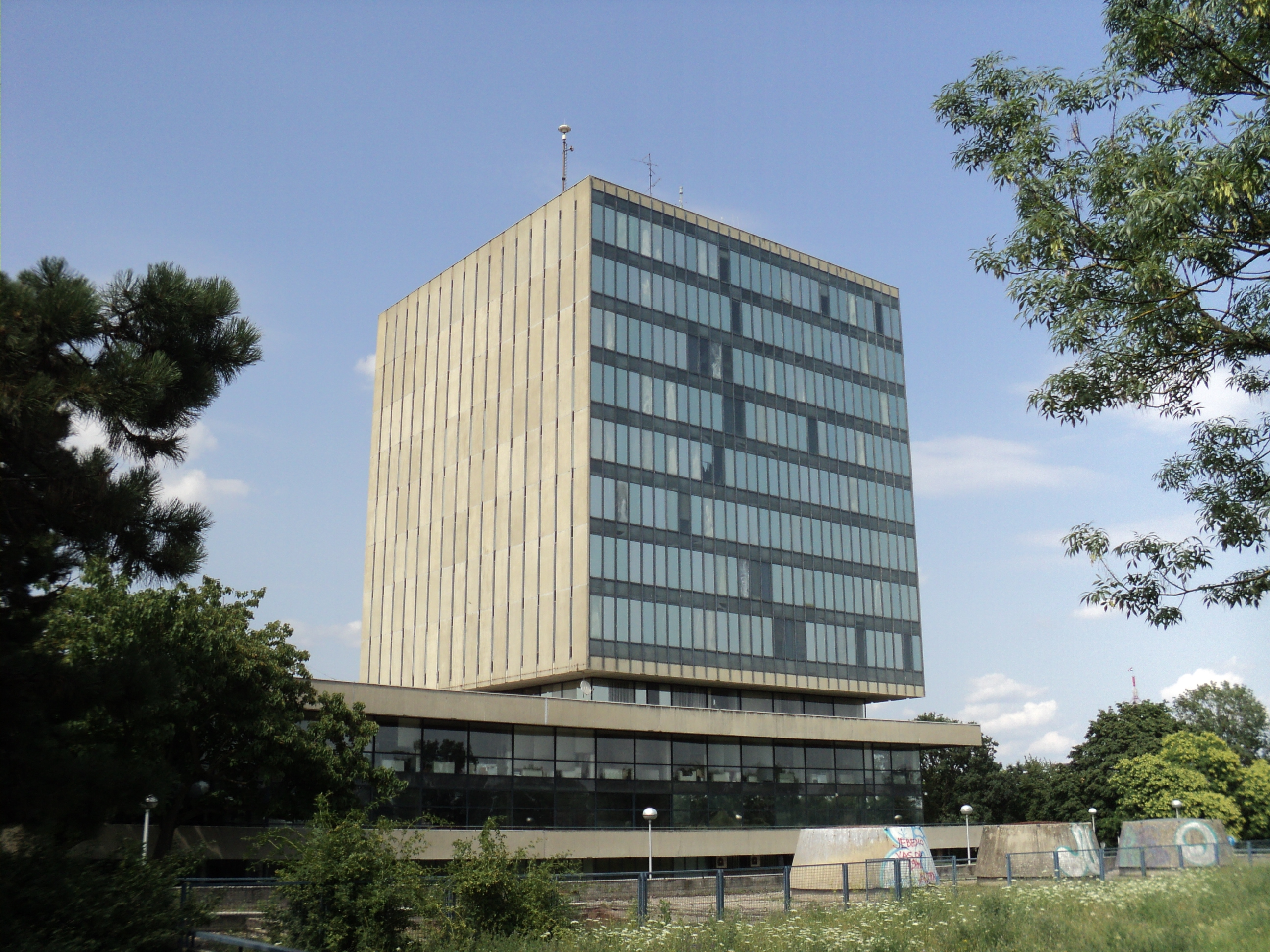
Kockica, one of Vitić's most notable projects

Ivan Vitić was born on 21 February 1917 in Šibenik, Austria-Hungary. He graduated from the Faculty of Engineering at the University of Zagreb in 1941. Following his studies, Vitić worked with Alfred Albini at the Department of Architectural Compositions until 1943. From 1945 to 1946, he worked briefly at the Croatian Ministry of Construction.

Vitić established his own architectural practice in 1951.

Ivan Vitić died on 21 December 1986 in Zagreb.
