= Vladimir Šterk =

Croatian architect (1891–1941)

- Born: 5 January 1891; Zagreb, Austro-Hungarian Monarchy, (now Croatia)
- Died: 6 March 1941 (aged 50); Zagreb, Kingdom of Yugoslavia

Residential and commercial corner building Rosinger - Jungwirth, designed by Šterk in 1930. – 1931.

Vladimir Šterk (5 January 1891 – 6 March 1941) was a well-known Croatian architect.

== Family and education ==
Šterk was born into a Jewish family, to father Vjekoslav-Alois Šterk and mother Lina (née Jelinek). In Zagreb he finished elementary school and graduated from the Gymnasium. Šterk participated in the World War I and was imprisoned in Russia, where he studied Russian wooden vernacular architecture. He attended the Czech Technical University in Prague from which he graduated on March 19, 1921.

== Career ==
After graduation he worked in the technical office of construction company "Špiller, Juzbašić and Šurina". From 1921 until 1923 he was employed at the office of Ignjat Fischer. For some time Šterk worked in the Zagreb construction office. He was one of the first assistant at the Technical university in Zagreb and one of the founding board members "Work for the people - a society of the Jewish and Anti-Zionist asimilants in Croatia" which was established in 1922. Šterk passed the practical exam for architects in 1922 and from 1923 he was an independent licensed architect in Zagreb. He projected part of the interior of the Yugoslav pavilion in Paris in 1925, which was designed by architect Stjepan Hribar, and a portion of the interior of the Yugoslav pavilion in Barcelona, which was designed by architect Dragiša Brašovan in 1929. Šterk designed and built many villas, residential houses and other buildings in Zagreb, the Zagreb area, Slavonski Brod, Požega, Osijek and Vinkovci. In 1931 he participated in the first exhibition of Yugoslav contemporary architecture in Belgrade, and in 1938 in the exhibition "Half a Century of Croatian Art" in Zagreb. Šterk was member of the society "Narodni rad - društvo židovskih asimilanata i anticionista u Hrvatskoj" (Peoples work - Society of Jewish assimilates and anti Zionists in Croatia).

== Death and personal life ==
Šterk came seriously sick in 1936. He died from leukemia in Zagreb on 6 March 1941 and was buried at the Mirogoj Cemetery. His widow Aleksandrina (née Favalle) and sons Vojko and Veljko continued to live in Zagreb until 1949, when they emigrated to Israel. In 2009 his son Vojko Šterk, after eight years and only from the third attempt, finally was granted with Croatian citizenship which was deprived from him during his family emigration to Israel in 1949. He now holds both Israel and Croatian passport.

== Works ==
- Corner semi-detached business building Slavonija d.d., Savska street (Savska ulica) 23, Zagreb. 1923
- Built-in residential building Omega d.d., King Zvonimir street (Ulica Kralja Zvonimira) 3, Zagreb. 1923 - 1924
- Built-in residential and commercial building Präger, Ivana Gundulića street (Gundulićeva ulica) 3, Zagreb. 1926 - 1927
- Detached residential building Schönbaum, Tuškanac street (Tuškanac) 25, Zagreb. 1926
- Corner built-in residential and commercial building Gross, British square (Britanski trg) 12, Zagreb. 1927–1928
- Detached residential building Bogdanović, Tuškanac street (Tuškanac) 90, Zagreb. 1927 - 1929
- Corner built-in residential building Draganec, King Petar Krešimir IV square (Trg Kralja Petra Krešimira IV) 17, Zagreb. 1927 - 1928
- Remodeling of the built-in residential building Jureša, Gjuro Deželić boulevard (Prilaz Gjure Deželića) 43, Zagreb. 1928 - 1931

== Bibliography ==
- Snješka Knežević, Aleksander Laslo (2011). Židovski Zagreb. Zagreb: AGM, Židovska općina Zagreb. ISBN 978-953-174-393-8.
- Goldstein, Ivo (2005). Židovi u Zagrebu 1918 - 1941. Zagreb: Novi Liber. ISBN 978-953-6045-23-5.
