= Petrovče =

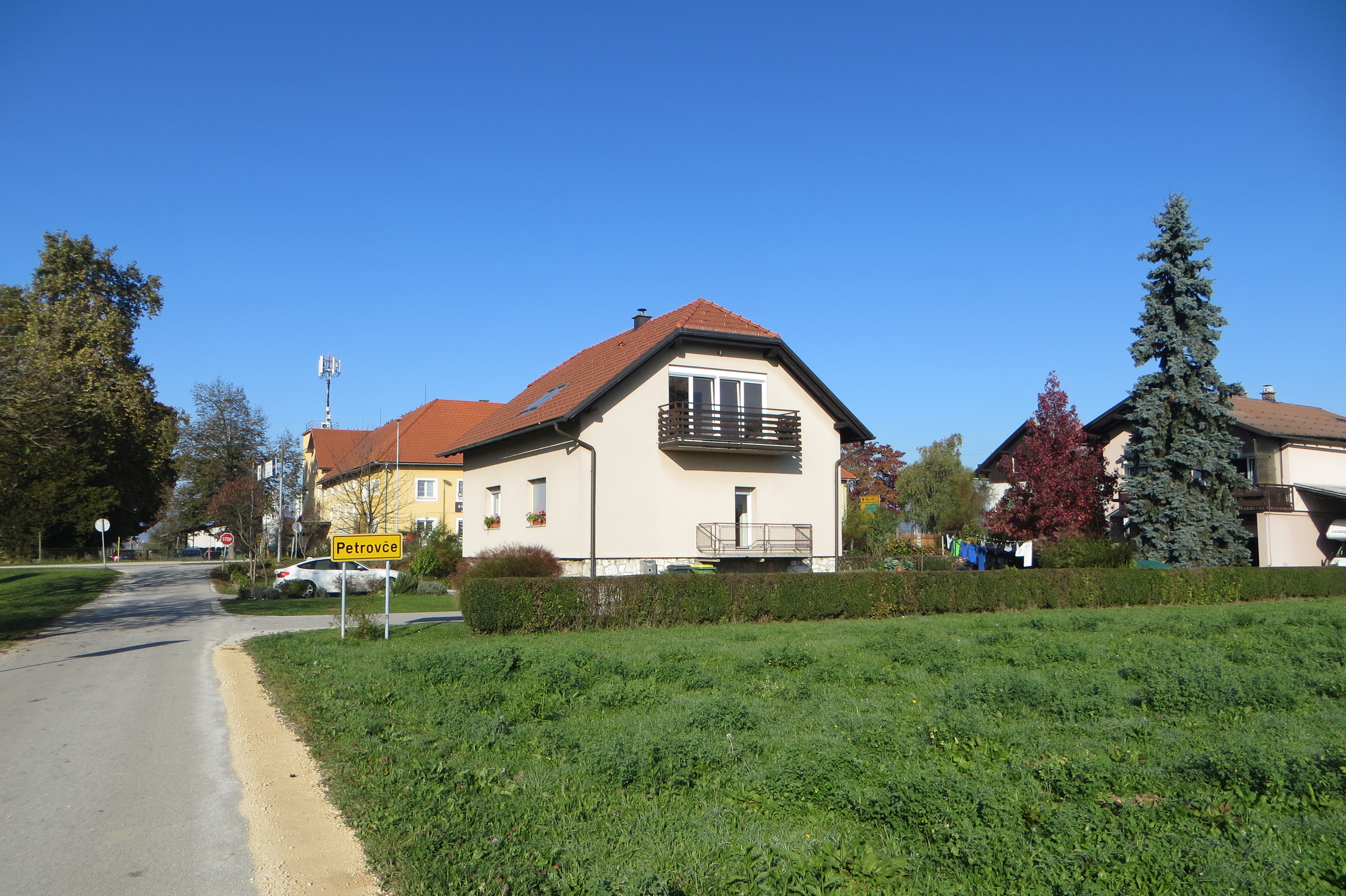

- Location in Slovenia
- Coordinates: 46°14′45.61″N 15°11′36.57″E
- Country: Slovenia
- Traditional region: Styria
- Statistical region: Savinja
- Municipality: Žalec

Area
  - Total: 1.72 km^{2} (0.66 sq mi)
- Elevation: 248 m (814 ft)

Population (2002)
  - Total: 909

Petrovče (pronounced [pɛˈtɾoːu̯tʃɛ]) is a village on the left bank of the Savinja River in the Municipality of Žalec in east-central Slovenia. The area is part of the traditional region of Styria. The municipality is now included in the Savinja Statistical Region.

== Church ==
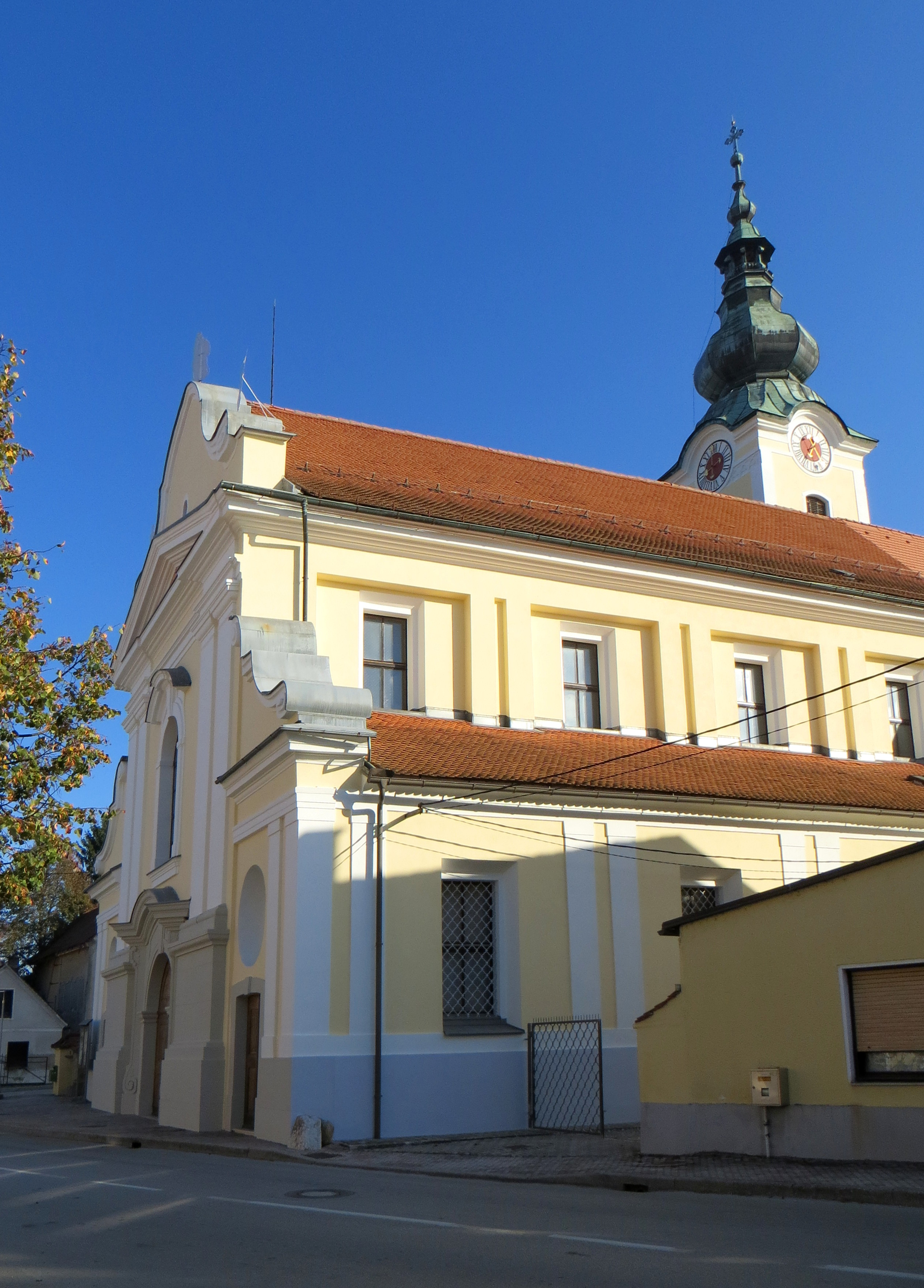
Visitation Church

The parish church in the settlement is dedicated to the Visitation of Mary (Slovene: Marijino obiskanje) and belongs to the Roman Catholic Diocese of Celje. It was built in the 18th century on the site of a 14th-century building.
