= James of Sclavonia =

Blessed James of Sclavonia OFM
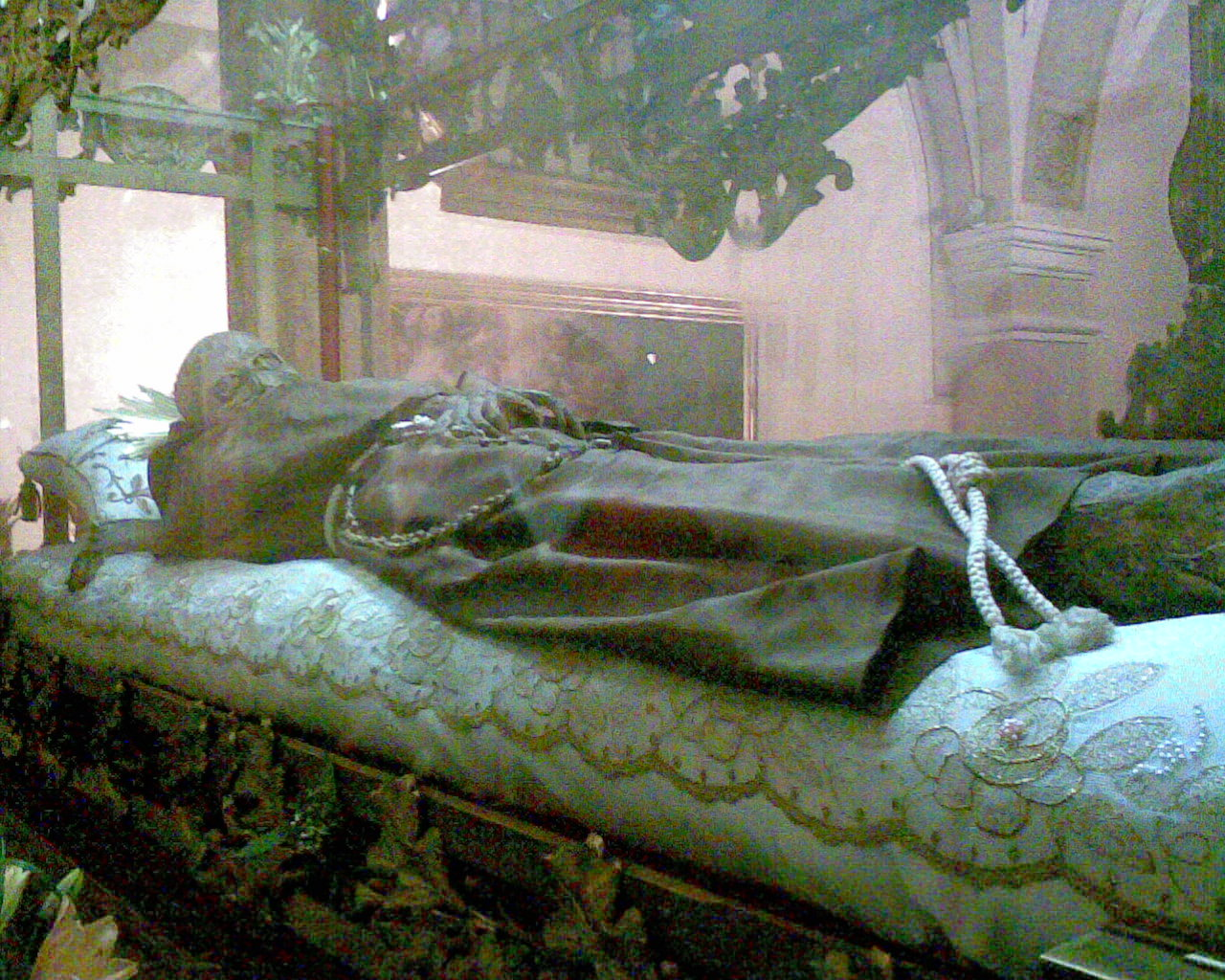
- James's tomb in Bitetto.

Personal details
- Born: c. 1400 Zadar, Croatia in the union with Hungary
- Died: 27 April 1485 or 1496 Bitetto, Bari, Kingdom of Naples

Sainthood
- Feast day: 20 April (Franciscans); 27 April
- Venerated in: Roman Catholic Church
- Beatified: 29 December 1700; Saint Peter's Basilica, Papal States by Pope Clement XI

James of Sclavonia (Croatian: Jakov Zadranin; c. 1400 – 27 April 1485 or 1496), also known as Giacomo Illirico, Giacomo of Bitetto or Jakov Varingez, was a Croatian friar of the Order of Friars Minor (Franciscans). He assumed the religious name "Giacomo". He was beatified on 29 December 1700 by Pope Clement XI and was proclaimed to be Venerable on 19 December 2009 by Pope Benedict XVI. He is patron of the town of Bitetto in Bari, Apulia, Italy.

== Life ==
James was born in Zadar around 1400 to a Croatian family of Leonardo and Beatrice Varinguer. At the age of 20 he joined the Franciscan order as a brother assistant.

In year 1438 his Franciscan deputy-provincial was requested to partake in the general chapter of the Franciscan Order in Bari, and chose James to accompany him. After they arrived James decided to stay. He lived in various Italian monasteries for 12 years, serving as a cook, before settling in one in Bitetto. James was specially devoted to the Passion of Christ and Virgin Mary, he was carrying by a penitential act, delivering the long-term prayers and contemplation, and even fell into raptures few times. James was also in charge of collecting alms, and this led him to numerous travels. During a plague epidemic of 1482 he cared patients infected with the plague.

He relocated to Bari in the Kingdom of Naples in order to escape Turkish invaders of Croatia between the ages of 18 and 20. It was there that he felt a deep call to religious life and thus decided to join the Order of Friars Minor in Bitetto. He spent his time there as a cook as well as a sacristan and gardener. He was known for his devout and simple life and was prone to ecstasies. He was also noted as being a miracle worker and for his skill of levitation. He worked with victims of the plague in 1482.

James died in Bitetto and was buried in a chapel built for him. He died on 27 April 1496 at the age of 96 and was exhumed two decades after his death in which it was found that he was incorrupt.

The Missal of the Croatian-speaking Franciscan community contains texts for liturgical veneration of the blessed James. In 1990, the diocesan process for his canonization was completed, and documents handed over to the Congregation for the Causes of Saints. He is celebrated in the church of St. Francis where believers from Bitetto brought his picture and reliquaries in 1989.

== Beatification ==
James was publicly honored since 1505. The beatification process commenced in Bari and culminated after Pope Clement XI (r. 1700–1721.) confirmed his cultus on 29 December 1700 and approved his veneration to the Franciscan Order. This accorded him the title of Blessed without the formal process needing to be completed on the account of his strong following. Pope Leo XIII (r. 1878–1903) allowed the Archdiocese of Zadar to venerate him.

For the canonization process to proceed he needed to be declared Venerable. The diocesan process in Bari opened under Pope John Paul II on 27 June 1989 and concluded around a decade after. It received two formal decrees of ratification on both 18 December 1998 and then a decade later on 19 December 2008. The Positio was submitted to the Congregation for the Causes of Saints in Rome in 1999 and was delegated to the historical commission around that time. It was on 19 December 2009 that he was proclaimed to be Venerable after Pope Benedict XVI recognized that James had lived a life of heroic virtue.

== Butler's account ==
The hagiographer Alban Butler wrote in his Lives of the Primitive Fathers, Martyrs, and Other Principal Saints (1798),

St. James of Sclavonia, or Illyricum, Confessor

“Though a native of Dalmatia, from which country he received his surname, he spent the chief part of his life on the opposite coast of the Adriatic sea, in Italy, where he embraced with great fervour the humble and penitential state of a lay-brother among the Observantin Franciscan friars at Bitetto, a small town, nine miles from Bari. By an eminent spirit of compunction, humility, self-denial, and heavenly contemplation, he seemed not to fall short in fervour of the greatest lights of his Order. He was seen by a fellow-friar, whose testimony is produced in the process for his canonization, raised in body from the ground at prayer, and many predictions, authentically proved, show him to have been often favoured by God with a prophetic spirit.”

He was sometimes removed to other neighbouring convents of his Order; and he was for some years employed in quality of cook in that of Conversano, eighteen miles from Bari. In this office, from the presence and sight of a temporal fire, he took occasion sometimes to contemplate the everlasting fire of hell, and at other times to soar in spirit above the highest heavens, to the source of infinite love which burns through all eternity, begging some spark to be kindled in his breast from this divine flame, which darts its rays on all creatures, though many unhappily shut their hearts to them, and receive not their influence. In such contemplation he often fell into ecstasies in the midst of his work, and stood for some time motionless and entirely absorpt in God.

One morning whilst he was making ready a mess of beans for his community's dinner, he happened to be thus ravished in spirit, and stood for a considerable time with his hand in the beans, having his mind absorpt in God, and tears streaming from his eyes, fell into the vessel of beans before him. The Duke of Adria, or Atria, in whose estate Conversano was comprised, and who often retired from the court of King Ferdinand I. to pass some months in the country, coming to this convent, passed through the kitchen, and saw the holy brother in this wonderful rapture. He stood some time in great surprise, and said, "Blessed are the religious brethren whose meals are seasoned with such tears." After he was gone from the place, James came to himself, and being informed that so great a guest was come, he went to ask the duke what he was pleased to order to be dressed for his dinner. "I will eat nothing," said the duke, "but some of the beans which have been seasoned with your tears". Which answer gave the saint extreme confusion. The duke took every occasion of testifying his extraordinary veneration for his sanctity.

St. James was sent back by his superiors to Bitetto, and there closed a holy life by a most happy death, in 1485, on the 27th of April: but his festival occurs on the 20th in the Martyrology published by Pope Benedict XIV. for the use of his Order. His body remains uncorrupted at Bitecto; and an account of many miracles wrought through his intercession is collected from authentic vouchers by Papebroke, in April, t. 3, p. 527.

== Sources ==
- "Blaženi Jakov Zadranin". Sveci.net (in Croatian). Archived from the original on 23 December 2015.
- "Blaženi Jakov Zadranin - Zagrebačka nadbiskupija" (in Croatian). Zg-nadbiskupija.hr.
- "Blessed Jakov Varingez". CatholicSaints.Info. Saints SQPN. 12 April 2015.
- "Blessed Jakov of Bietto". Santi e Beati. 2002.
- Butler, Alban (1798), The Lives of the Primitive Fathers, Martyrs, and Other Principal Saints... by the Rev. Alban Butler..., J. Moir This article incorporates text from this source, which is in the public domain.
- "Franjevačka provincija Sv. Jeronima u Dalmaciji i Istri | Bl. Jakov Zadranin". Ofm-sv-jeronim.hr. 31 July 2015.
