= Stjepan Krasić =

Father Stjepan Krasić OP D.Th D.Sc Dr.h.c.
- Stjepan Krasić
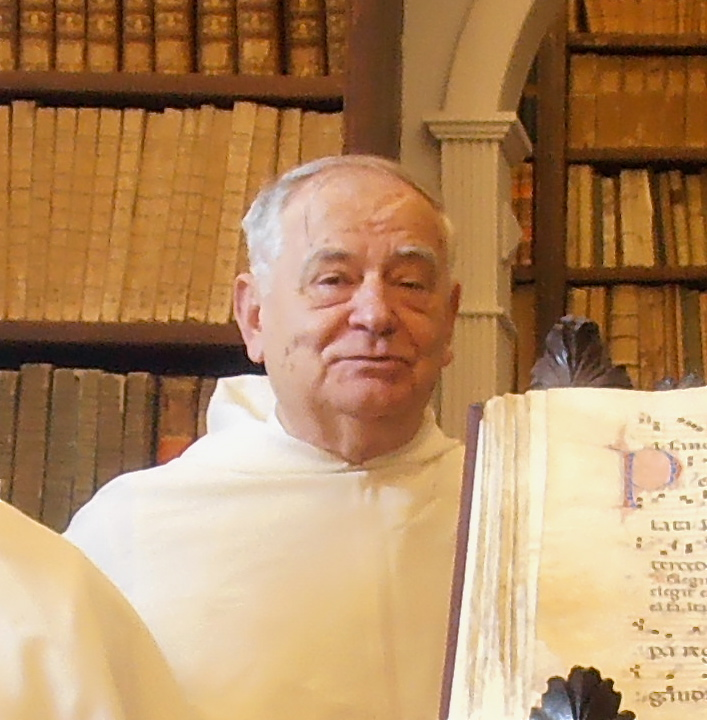
- Born: October 6, 1938; Čitluk, Kingdom of Yugoslavia
- Education: Pontifical University of Saint Thomas Aquinas; Pontifical Gregorian University
- Scientific career
- Fields: History

Stjepan Krasić (pronounced [stjêpaːn krásit͡ɕ]; 6 October 1938) is a Croatian historian, theologian and Roman Catholic friar of the Order of Preachers, member of the Croatian Dominican Province and member of the International Academy of Engineering.

== Early life ==
Stjepan Krasić was born in Čitluk, in what was then the Kingdom of Yugoslavia (present Bosnia and Herzegovina) to Ivan and Luce née Pervan. In Čitluk he attended elementary school and from 1950 to 1957 continued his education in the Classical Grammar School in Bol. After serving a military service, from 1960 he studied philosophy in Dubrovnik and theology in Zagreb and at the Pontifical University of Saint Thomas Aquinas in Rome. He studied history at the Pontifical Gregorian University.

He has taught at Dubrovnik International University and the Pontifical University of Saint Thomas Aquinas in Rome.

He has also served as the president of the Croatian Historical Institute in Rome, the editor-in-chief of the journal Angelicum, and as an advisor to the Congregation for the Causes of Saints in the Vatican.

== Academic vocation ==
In addition to the theological study, Krasić also attended the Vatican School of Palaeography, Diplomatics and Archive Administration. Krasić received his first doctorate at the Pontifical University of Saint Thomas Aquinas making a historical dissertation on the subject of the Dominican Congregation of Dubrovnik in 1970. In 1985 Krasić received a doctorate in the field of history by dissertation about Stjepan Gradić. His professorship Krasić started as a research assistant in 1973 at the Pontifical University of Saint Thomas Aquinas. Ten years later he became a full professor teaching history and methodology of scientific work.

His work focuses on the history of the Dominican Order in Croatia.

In the book General University of the Dominican Order in Zadar or Universitas Jadertina 1396 - 1807 published in 1996 Krasić discovered that the first Croatian university was founded in 1396 in Zadar. It had faculties of philosophy and theology with the privilege of giving the highest academic titles of baccalaureate and doctorate. His work had a great scientific and cultural importance for the Croatian society. Until then, the University of Zagreb founded in 1669 was considered the oldest in Croatia. Based on that discovery the Croatian Parliament in 2003 awarded the title of the university to the Faculty of Humanities in Zadar.

In 2010 he published a book on the history of the Croatian language in the 17th century and the role of the Catholic church in helping to standardise the language.

In 1997 he became a corresponding member of the Croatian Academy of Sciences and Arts.

In October 2015, Krasić was unanimously elected as a member of the International Academy of Engineering due to his distinguished studies in the humanities which has uncovered many hitherto unknown aspects of the history of engineering and technology.

== Honours ==
- Zadar City Award for Lifetime Achievement in 1996
- Gold medal of the Faculty of Philosophy in Zadar in 1996
- Order of the Croatian Daystar by the Republic of Croatia in 1998
- Honorary Doctorate of the University of Zadar for outstanding contributions in the field of humanities in 2005
- Lifetime Achievement Award of Dubrovnik-Neretva County in 2009

== Publications ==
=== Books ===
- Congregatio Ragusina Ord. Praed. 1487-1550 (1972)
- Stjepan Gradić (1613-1683). Život i djelo (1987)
- Ivan Dominik Stratiko (1732-1799). Život i djelo (1991)
- Dominikanci u srednjovjekovnoj Bosni (1996)
- Generalno učilište Dominikanskog reda u Zadru ili "Universitas Jadertina" (1396 - 1807) (1996)
- Dominikanci. Povijest Reda u hrvatskim krajevima (1997)
- Pet stoljeća dominikanske nazočnosti u Korčuli: 1498. - 1998 (1998)
- Povijest Dubrovačke metropolije i dubrovačkih nadbiskupa (1999)
- Počelo je u Rimu. Katolička obnova i normiranje hrvatskog jezika u XVII. st. (2009)
- Nastanak i razvoj školstva od antike do srednjega vijeka (2012)
- Prag i Zadar: dva europska sveučilišna središta u XIV. stoljeću / Prague and Zadar : two European University Centres in the 14th Century (2015)
- Kandijski rat i oslobođenje Klisa od Turaka godine 1648 (2018)

=== Selected papers ===
- Semantic Scholar website, Stjepan Krasić
- Croatian Scientific Bibliography website, Stjepan Krasić (CROSBI Profile: 17027, MBZ: 229414)
