= Alfred Albini =

Croatian-Jewish architect (1896–1978)

- Born: 15 July 1896; Zagreb, Austro-Hungarian Empire, (now Croatia)
- Died: 4 November 1978 (aged 82); Zagreb, SFR Yugoslavia
- Education: University of Zagreb

Alfred Albini (Croatian pronunciation: [ǎlfred albǐːni]; 15 July 1896 – 4 November 1978) was a Croatian-Jewish architect. He received a Vladimir Nazor Award for architecture and urban planning.

Albini was born and died in Zagreb. He worked at the ateliers of Viktor Kovačić and Hugo Ehrlich and as a professor at the Faculty of Architecture at the University of Zagreb. He projected single-family houses and apartment buildings, together with civic buildings (Faculty of Technology at the University of Zagreb). He synthesized modernistic ideas into his own architectural expression. Furthermore, he discussed the problem of urban planning and the protection of landmarks, wrote expert works and theoretical articles, and painted. Albini died on 4 November 1978 in Zagreb. He was buried at the Mirogoj Cemetery.

== See also ==
- List of Croatian architects

== Bibliography ==
- Goldstein, Ivo (2005). Židovi u Zagrebu 1918 - 1941. Zagreb: Novi Liber. ISBN 953-6045-23-0.
