= Bitetto =

- Comune
- Comune di Bitetto
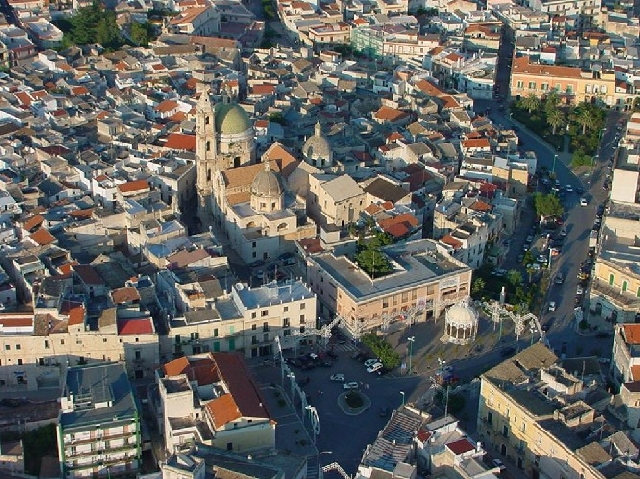
- View of Bitetto

- Coat of arms

- Location within Italy Location within Apulia
- Coordinates: 41°02′N 16°45′E
- Country: Italy
- Region: Apulia
- Metropolitan city: Bari (BA)

Government
  - Mayor: Fiorenza Pascazio

Area
  - Total: 116 km^{2} (45 sq mi)
- Elevation: 139 m (456 ft)

Population (30 April 2017)
  - Total: 12,001
  - Density: 103/km^{2} (268/sq mi)
- Demonym: Bitettesi
- Time zone: UTC+1 (CET)
  - Summer (DST): UTC+2 (CEST)
- Postal code: 072010
- Dialing code: 080
- Patron saint: Jakov Varingez
- Saint day: April 27
- Website: Official website

Bitetto (Barese: Vetétte; Latin: Vitetum, Bisctictum or Bitectum) is a town and comune in the Metropolitan City of Bari, Apulia, Italy.

== Main sights ==
The main attraction of Bitetto is the cathedral, dedicated to Saint Michael, one of the main examples of Apulian Romanesque architecture, built in 1335. It has a sober façade divided by false columns with a big rose window. Of the three portals, the central one has a rich series of sculptures: two stone lions supporting columns with carved capitals showing vegetable motifs; these in turn support is a lunette with basreliefs of Christ and the twelve apostles. The frame has instead scenes from the New Testament. The interior was plastered in the 18th century, but was restored to the original Romanesque style in 1959. It has a nave and two aisles; the transept has three apses.

The diocese of which the building was the cathedral was founded at some date between a bull of Pope John XIX in 1025, which does not mention it among the suffragan sees of Bari, and the bull Quia nostris temporibus of Pope Urban II in 1089, which does list it among them. Its bishop Raus, the first whose name is known, took part in the Third Lateran Council in 1179. Its last bishop died on 1 January 1798. In 1818, the see was incorporated into the archdiocese of Bari. No longer a residential bishopric, Bitetto (Bitettum in Latin) is today listed by the Catholic Church as a titular see.

== Notable people ==
- Alessio Mininni (born 1997), singer
- blessed James of Sclavonia (Zadar, Croatia in the union with Hungary c. 1400 - Bitetto, 1496), Franciscan

== Twin towns ==
- Prienai, Lithuania
- Józefów, Poland
