= Stelvio Mestrovich =

- Born: 20 June 1948; Zadar, Croatia
- Occupation: Novelist, poet, literary critic, musicologist

Stelvio Mestrovich (Italian pronunciation: [ˈstɛlvjo], born 20 June 1948) is a writer, born in Zadar, then part of Yugoslavia, today in Croatia. His parents were Italian.

He has contributed to the Viennese magazine LOG, under the auspices of UNESCO, and has an entry in the Dizionoir, published by Delos Books.

His first novel, Suor Franziska, won the 2009 Viareggio-Farabolina Prize.

== Published works ==
- "Il mio ultimo chiarodiluna" (Poem, Italy, 1974)
- "Il Ponte-die Bruecke" (Poem, Germany, 1979, ISBN 3-88325-378-2)
- "Suor Franziska" (Novel, Italy, 1992)
- "Il diario di Lucida Mansi" (Novel, Italy, 1995)
- "Anton Diabelli, un genio tranquillo" (Essay, Italy, 2001)
- "Appunti di archeologia musicale" (Essay, Italy, 2002, ISBN 88-8251-136-7)
- "Venezia rosso sangue" (Crime Novel, Italy, 2004 ISBN 978-88-7758-555-4)
- "W.A.Mozart, il Cagliostro della musica" (Essay, Italy, 2006 ISBN 978-88-89421-36-9)
- "Delitto in casa Goldoni" (Crime Novel, Italy, 2007 ISBN 978-88-95078-53-3)
- "La sindrome di Jaele" (Crime Novel, Italy, 2009 ISBN 978-88-6096-421-2)
- "Il mostro di Ebersdorf" (Crime Novel, Italia, 2010 ISBN 978-88-6490-008-7)
