= Vjekoslav Bastl =

Croatian architect

- Born: 13 August 1872; Příbram, Kingdom of Bohemia, Austria-Hungary
- Died: 3 September 1947 (aged 75); Zagreb, PR Croatia, SFR Yugoslavia
- Occupation: Architect
- Practice: Hönigsberg & Deutsch
- Buildings: Kallina House, Zagreb Ethnographic Museum

Vjekoslav "Alojz" Bastl (13 August 1872 – 3 September 1947) was a Croatian architect known for his diverse secessionist architectural style. His work circulated mostly within the boundaries of Zagreb, where he resided. Later in life, he was heavily influenced by modernism. Today, he is regarded as one of the highlights of early modern architecture in Croatia.

== Biography ==
Bastl was born on 13 August 1872 to an ethnic Czech family in Příbram in Bohemia, Austria-Hungary. He eventually moved to Zagreb where he established a status as an architect working for the Hönigsberg & Deutsch atelier. His motives for emigrating to Croatia remain unknown (Croatian lands and Czech lands were part of one empire at the time). Upon arrival, he enrolled in the Royal crafts school, graduating in 1896.

== Work ==
Arranged chronologically:

- Pečić House - 43 Ilica st. (1899)
- Ethnographic Museum, Zagreb (1902)
- Rado House - 5 Ban Jelačić square (1904–1905)
- Feller House - Ban Jelačić square (1905–1906)
- Kallina House, 20 Gundulićeva st.
- Hrvatsko-slavonska zemaljska štedionica - Ilica 25
- Goršak House - 166 Ilica st. (1906)
- Hodovsky House - 47 Gajeva st. (1909–1910)
- Hotel Manduševac - Vlaška st. (1920)
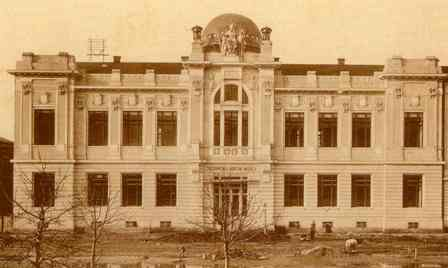
Zagreb Ethnographic Museum (1905–1906)

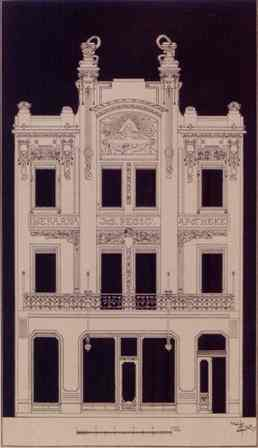
Pečić House (1899)

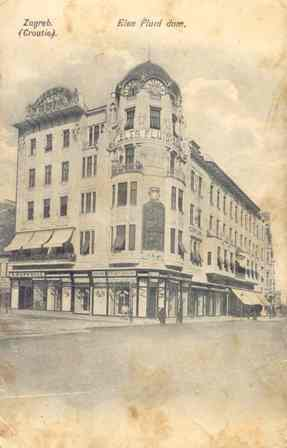
Feller House (1905–1906)

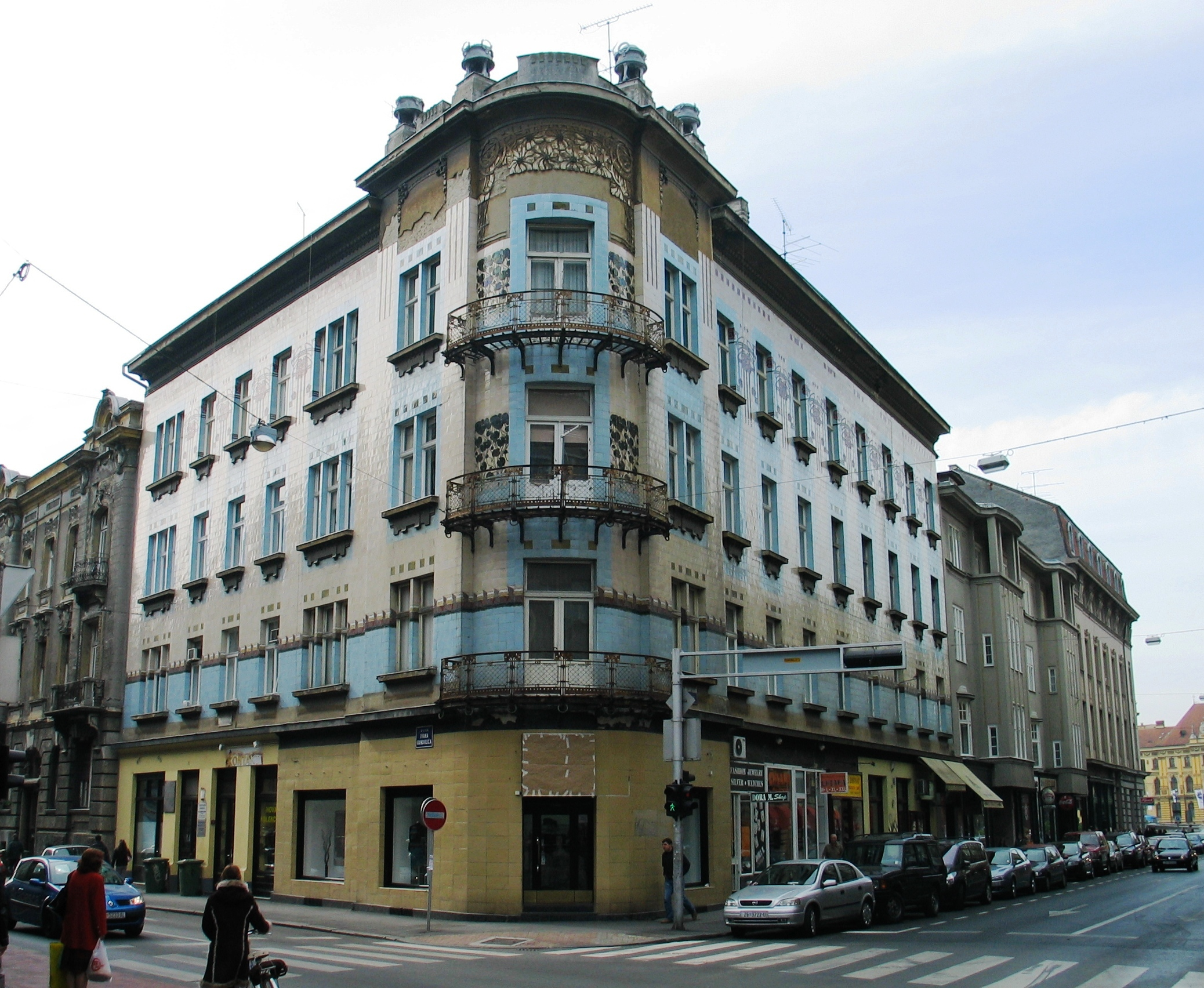
Kallina House (1903–1904)

== Sources ==
- Vjekoslav Bastl (in Croatian)
- Bastl, Vjekoslav (in Croatian)
