= List of people from Zadar County =

The following is a list of notable people from Zadar (Zara) and the geographical area corresponding to present-day Zadar County.

== Artists, musicians and actors ==
- Steve Bacic (born 1965), actor
- Nikola Bašić (born 1946), architect
- Tomislav Bralić (born 1968), singer
- Natali Dizdar (born 1984), pop singer
- Tullio Carminati (1894–1971), actor
- Gianni Garko (born 1935), actor
- Giorgio da Sebenico (1410–1475), sculptor and architect
- Francesco Laurana (1430–1502), sculptor and architect
- Luciano Laurana (c. 1420 – 1479), architect and engineer
- Tihana Lazović (born 1990), actress
- Ottavio Missoni (1921–2013), designer
- Antun Nalis (1911–2000), actor
- Andrea Schiavone (c. 1510/1515–1563), painter
- Tamara Šoletić (born 1965), actress
- Živko Stojsavljević (1900–1979), painter
- Giorgio Ventura (c. 1570 – c. 1610), painter
- Anđeo Lovrov Zadranin, 14th-century architect
- Juraj Lovrov Zadranin, 14th-century architect
- Antonio Pini-Corsi (1858–1918), opera baritone
- Katija Zubčić (born 1958), actress
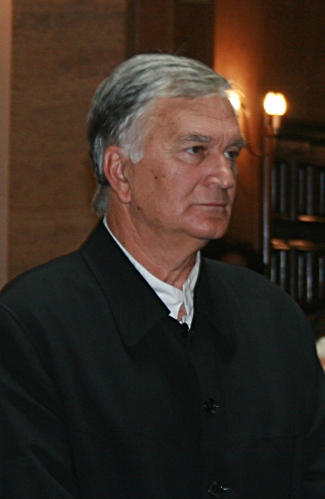
Bašić

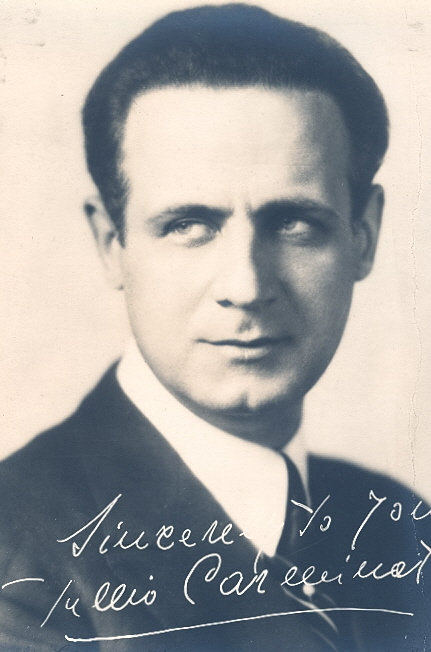
Carminati

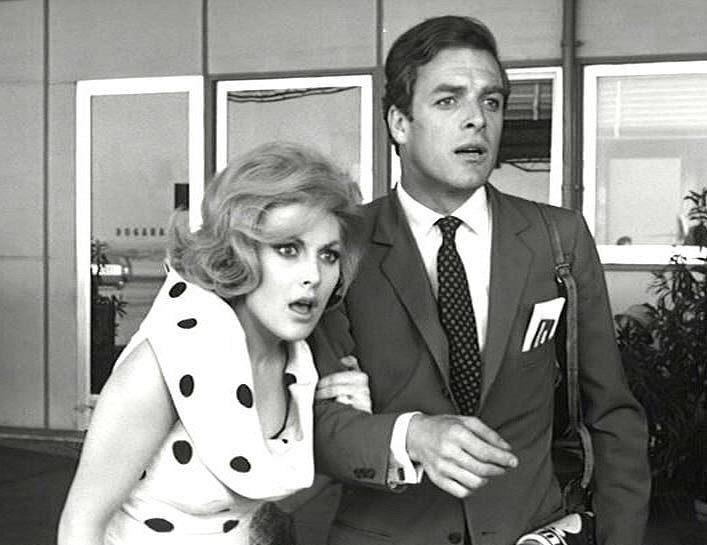
Garko

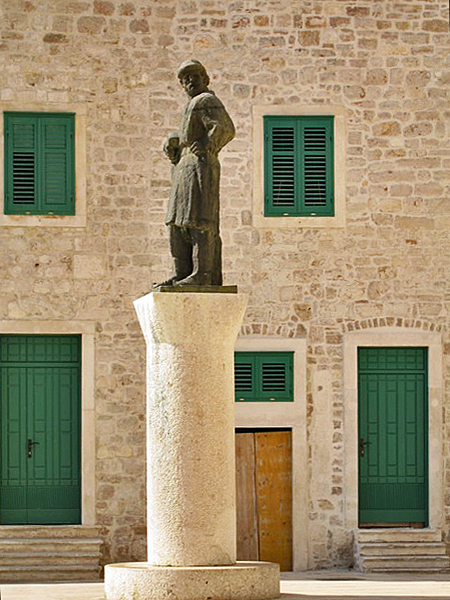
Giorgio da Sebenico

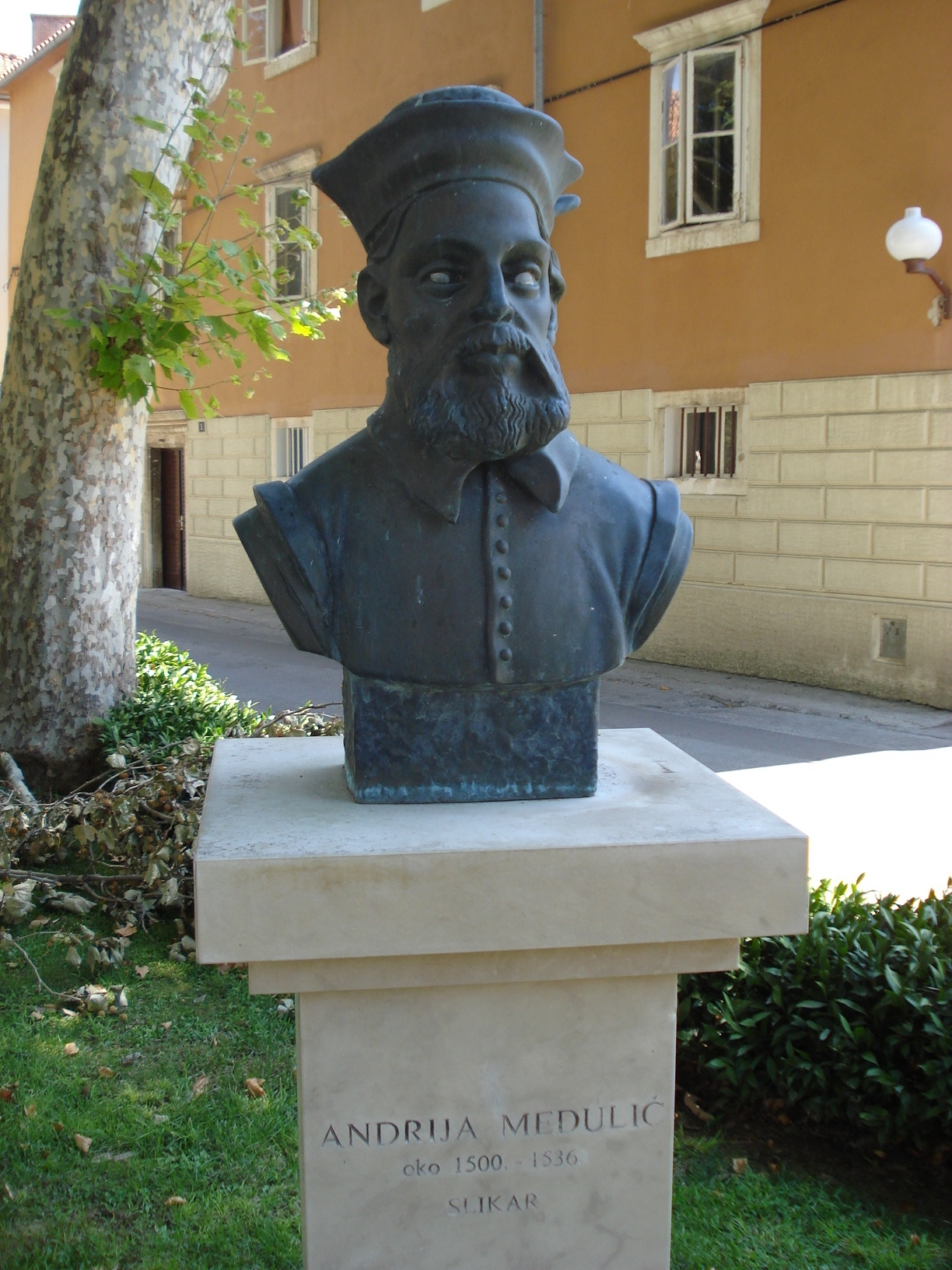
Schiavone

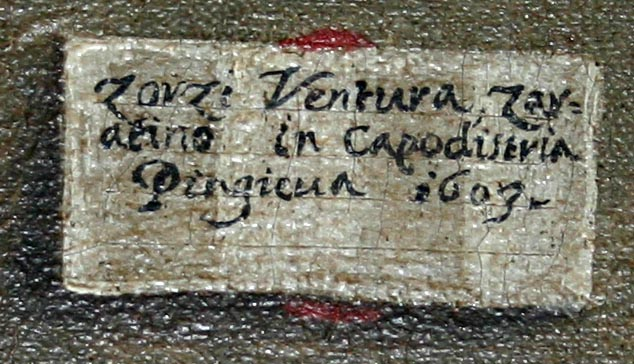
Ventura

== Authors ==
- Juraj Baraković (1548–1628), poet
- Arturo Colautti (1851–1914), journalist, polemicist and librettist
- Vladan Desnica (1905–1967), writer
- Vincenzo Duplancich (1905–1967), journalist
- Riccardo Foster (1869–1939), poet, journalist
- Pavle Kalinić (born 1959), writer
- Brne Karnarutić (1515–1573), poet
- Bartol Kašić (c. 1575 – 1650), scribe, translator
- Stelvio Mestrovich (born 1958), writer, musicologist, and critic
- Pier Alessandro Paravia (1797–1857), writer, scholar, philanthropist and professor of Italian eloquence
- Mima Simić (born 1976), writer, film critic, translator, LGBT activist
- Savo Štrbac (born 1949), author and lawyer
- Tanja Stupar-Trifunović (born 1977), writer
- Jovan Sundečić (1825–1900), poet, Orthodox Christian priest, secretary of Prince Nikola I of Montenegro
- Jeronim Vidulić (c. 1430 – 1499), poet
- Petar Zoranić (c. 1508, died 1543–1569), writer
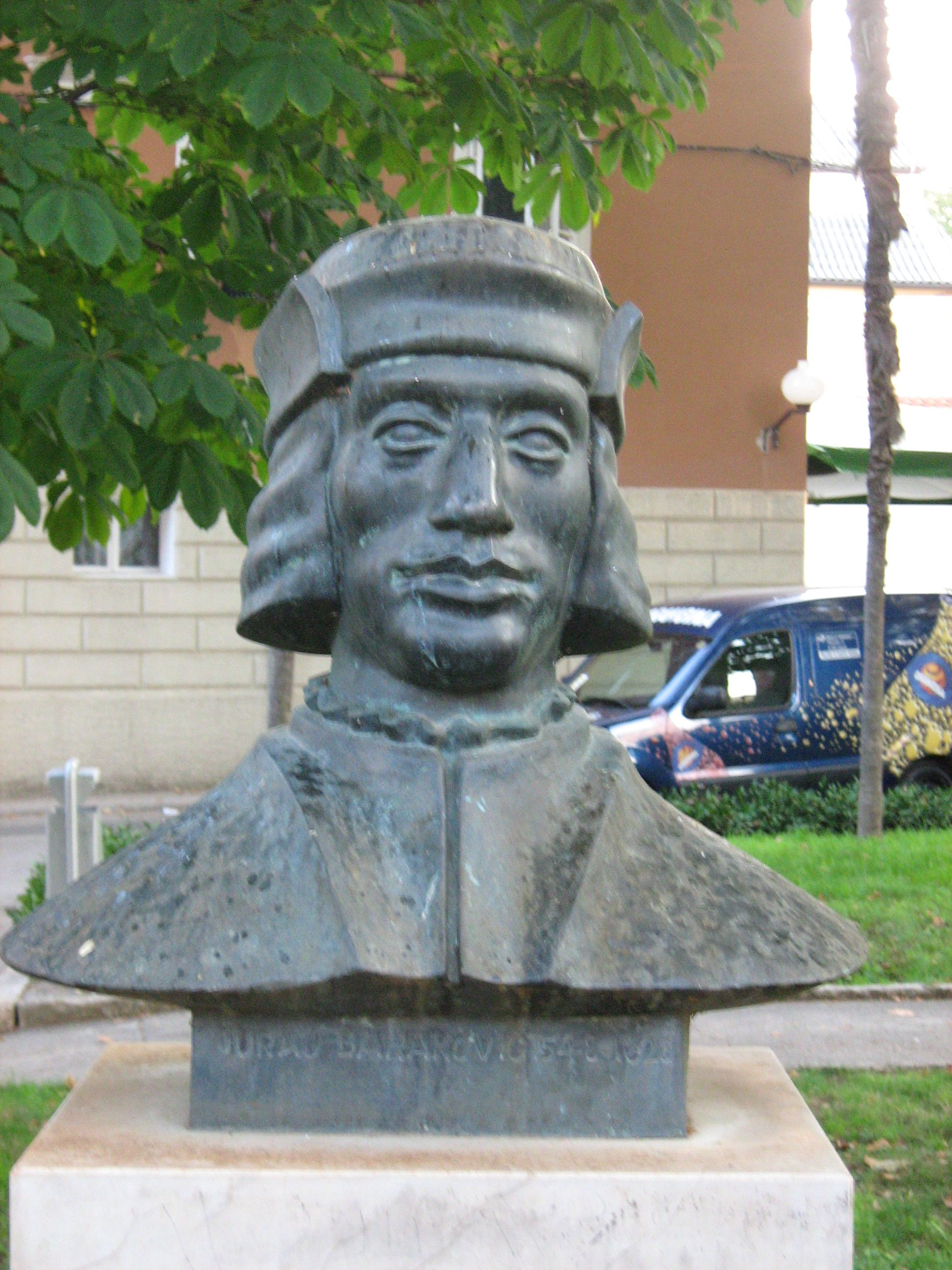
Baraković

Colautti

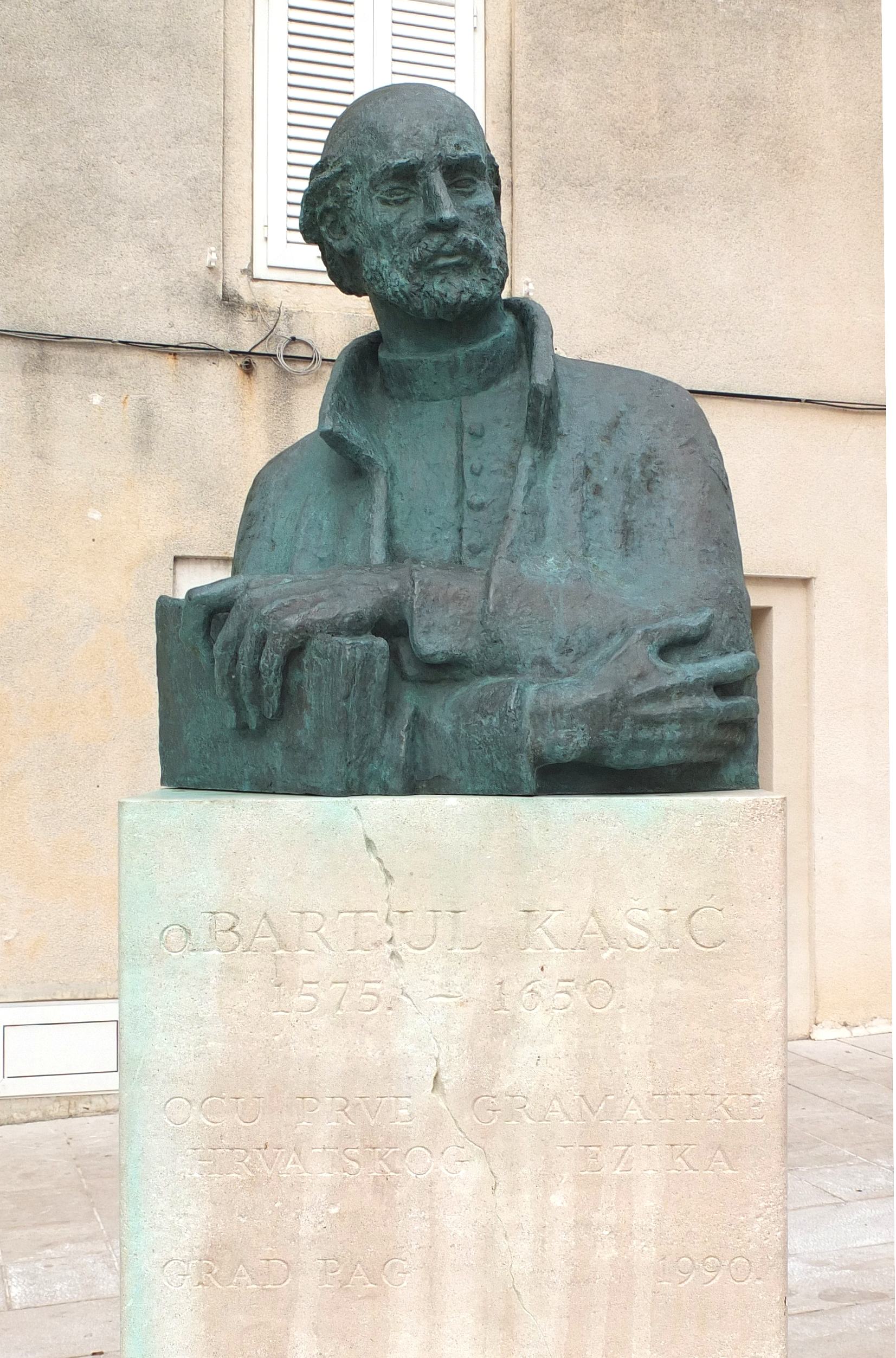
Kašić

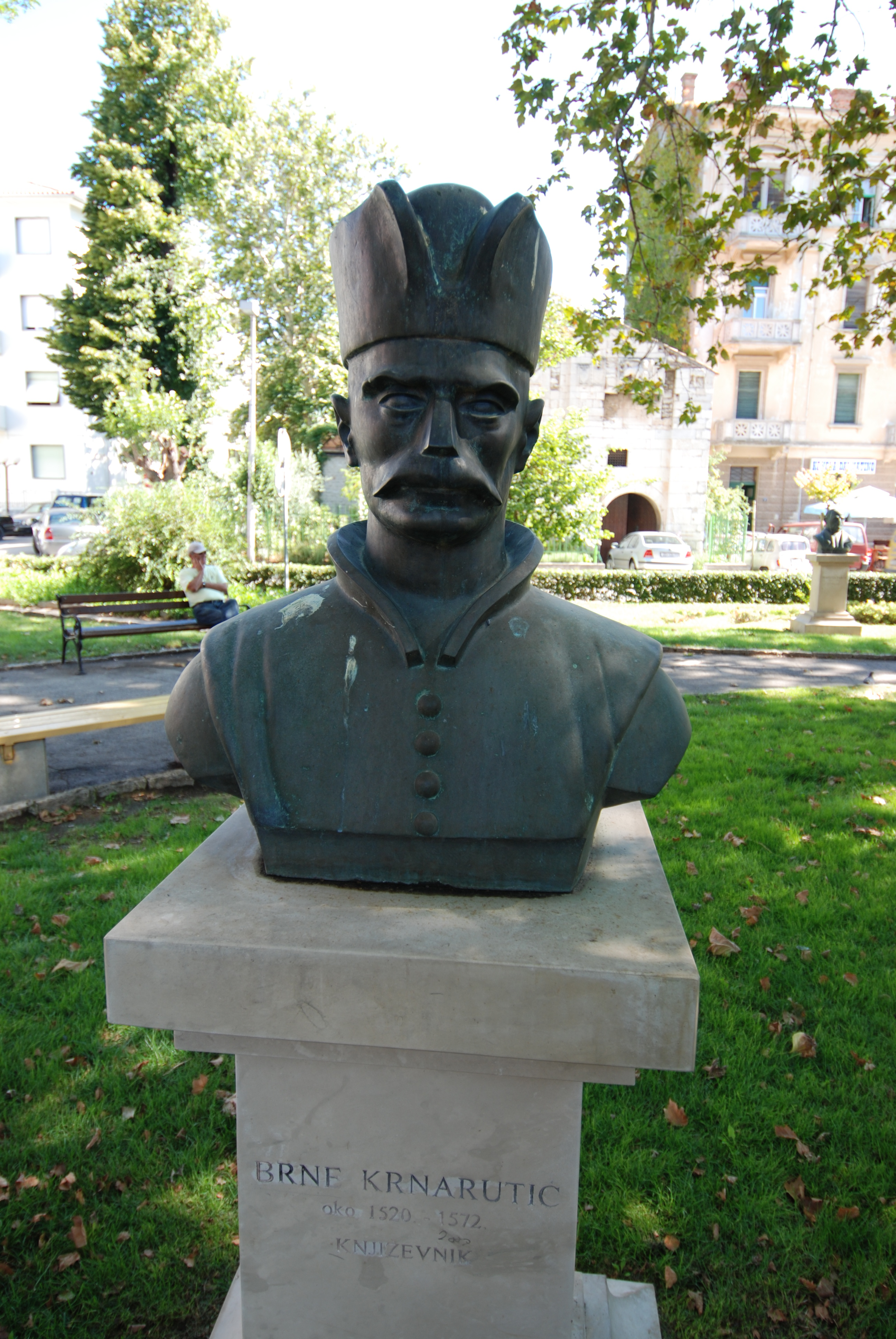
Karnarutić

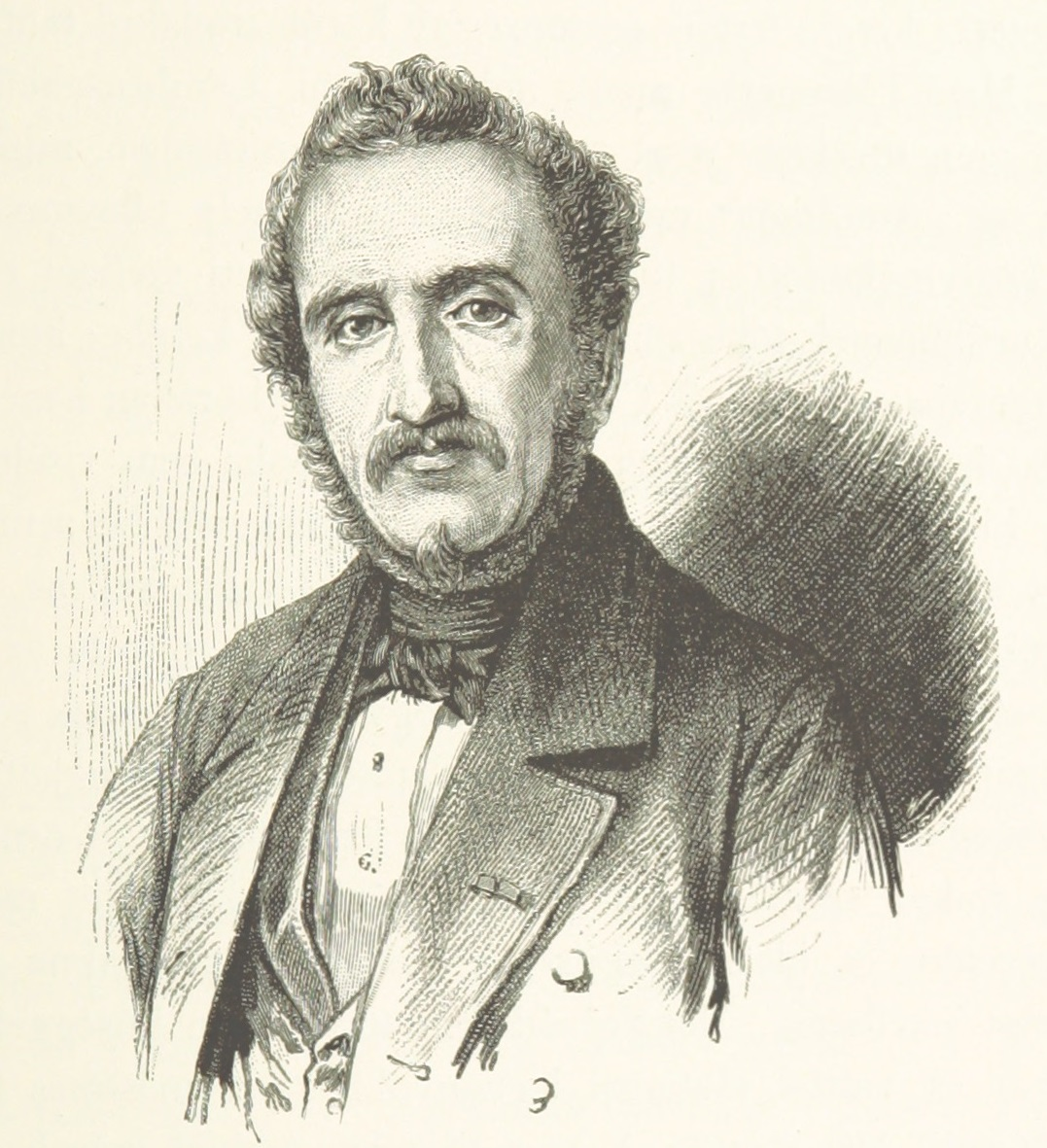
Paravia

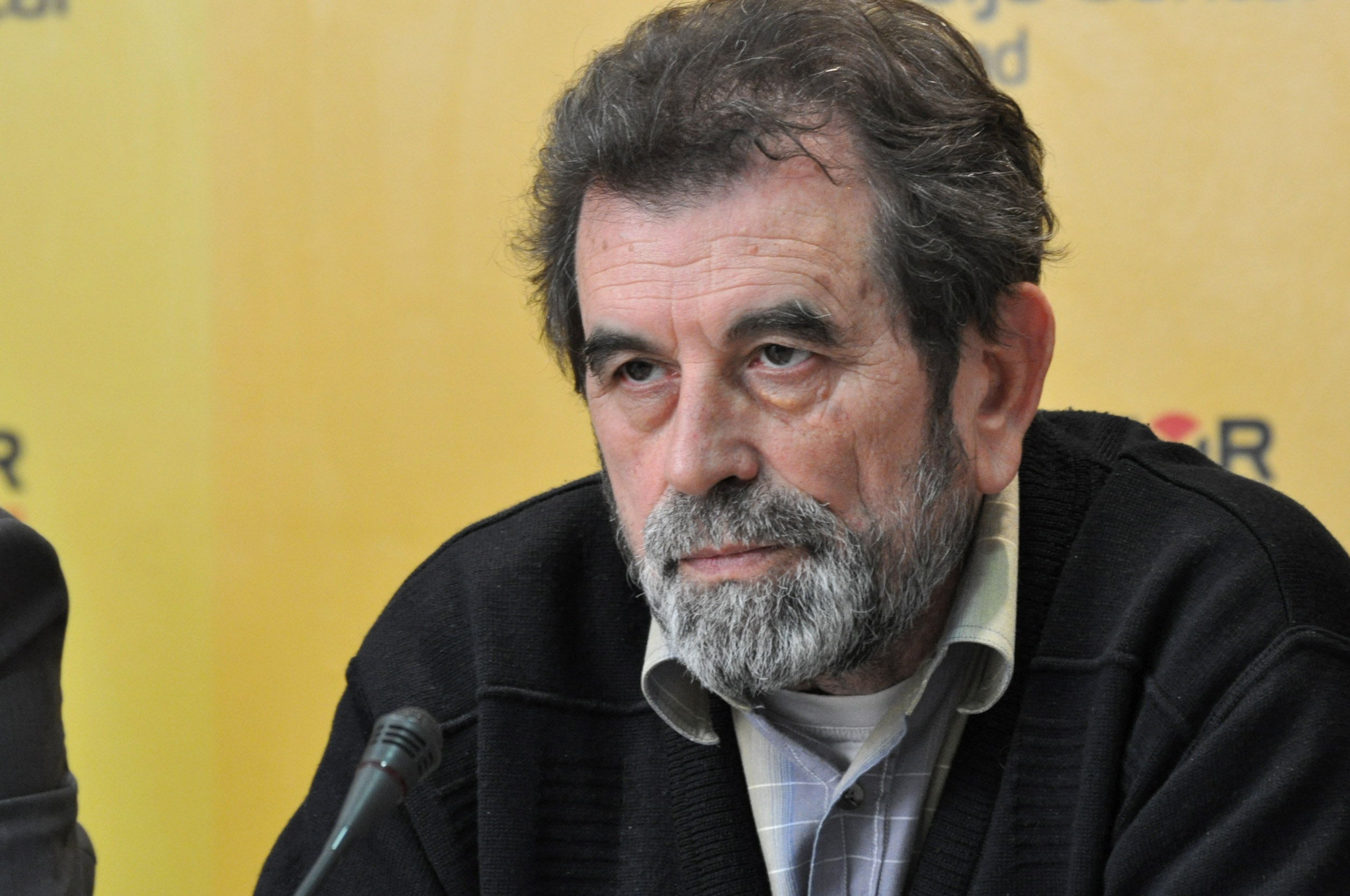
Štrbac

== Military leaders ==
- Branimir of Croatia (9th century), Croatian leader active in the area of Nin
- Ante Gotovina (born 1955), lieutenant-general
- Furio Lauri (1918–2002), aviator
- Velimir Škorpik, Yugoslav Partisan commander
- Danilo Stanisavljević (1917–1942), uprising leader
- Georg von Trapp (1880–1947), naval officer
- Vladimir Velebit (1907–2004), major-general, lawyer, historian, diplomat
- Ante Zemljar (1922–2004), military officer, poet
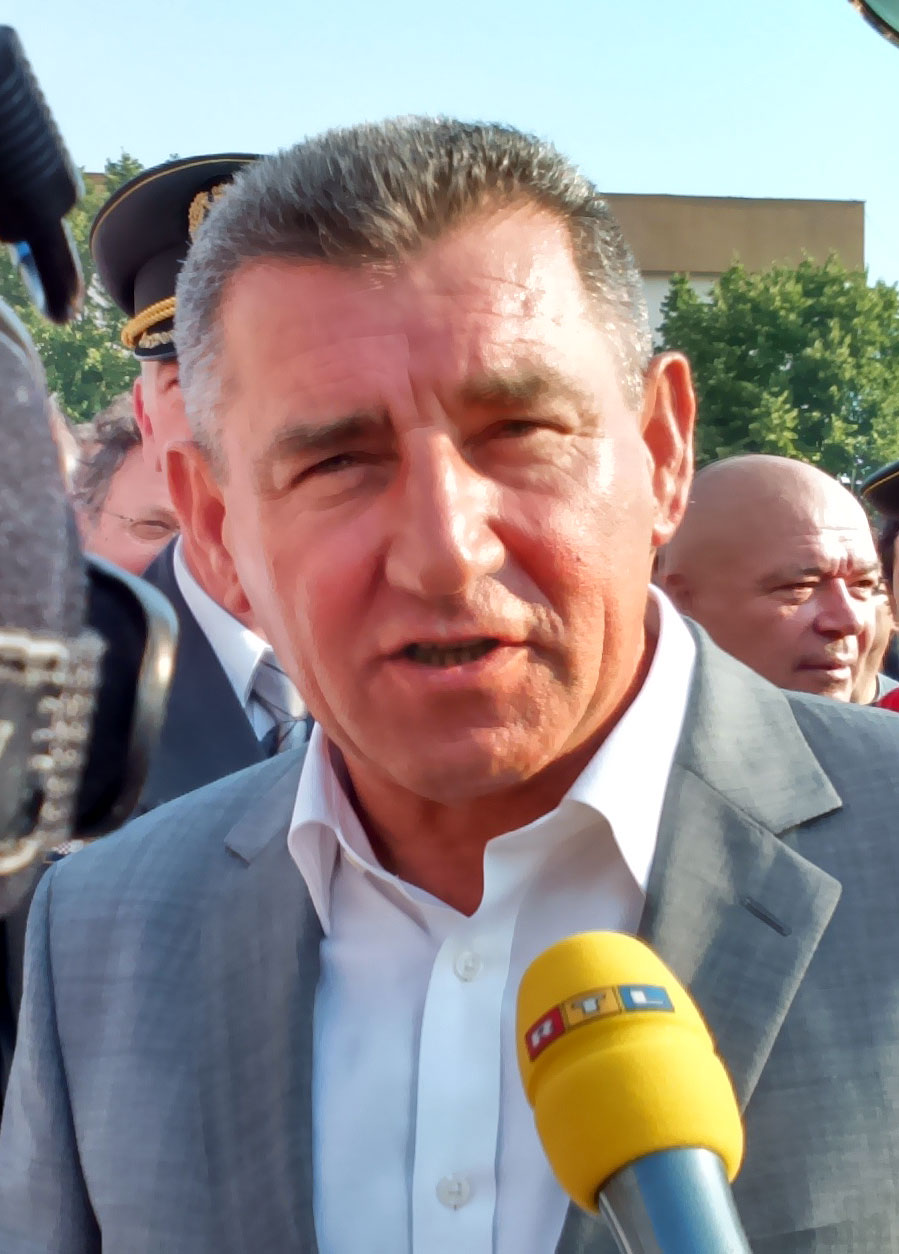
Gotovina

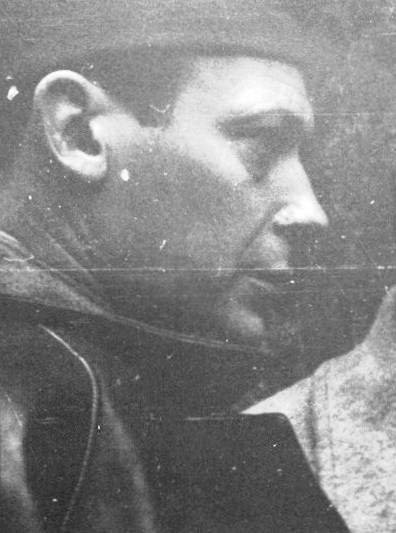
Velebit

== Musicians ==
- Valter Dešpalj (born 1947), cellist and music professor
- Natali Dizdar (born 1984), singer
- Mladen Grdović (born 1958), singer
- Tomislav Ivčić (1953–1993), singer and composer
- Emilija Kokić (born 1968), singer
- Marie Kraja (1911–1999), opera singer
- Ivana Radovniković (born 1985), singer
- Michele Stratico (1728–1783), composer and violinist
- Felix Weingartner (1863–1942), composer
- Ksenija Zečević (1956–2006), pianist and composer
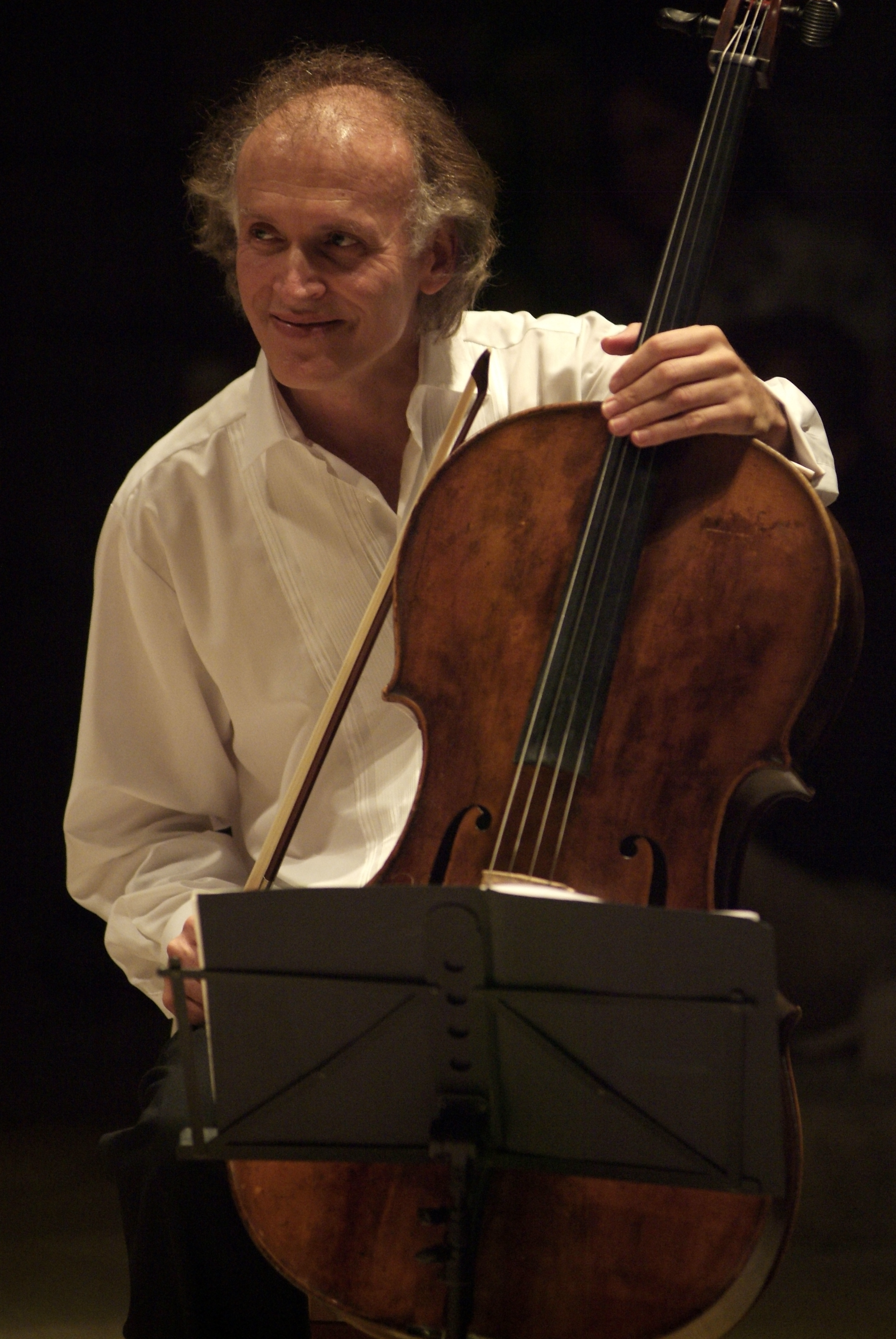
Dešpalj

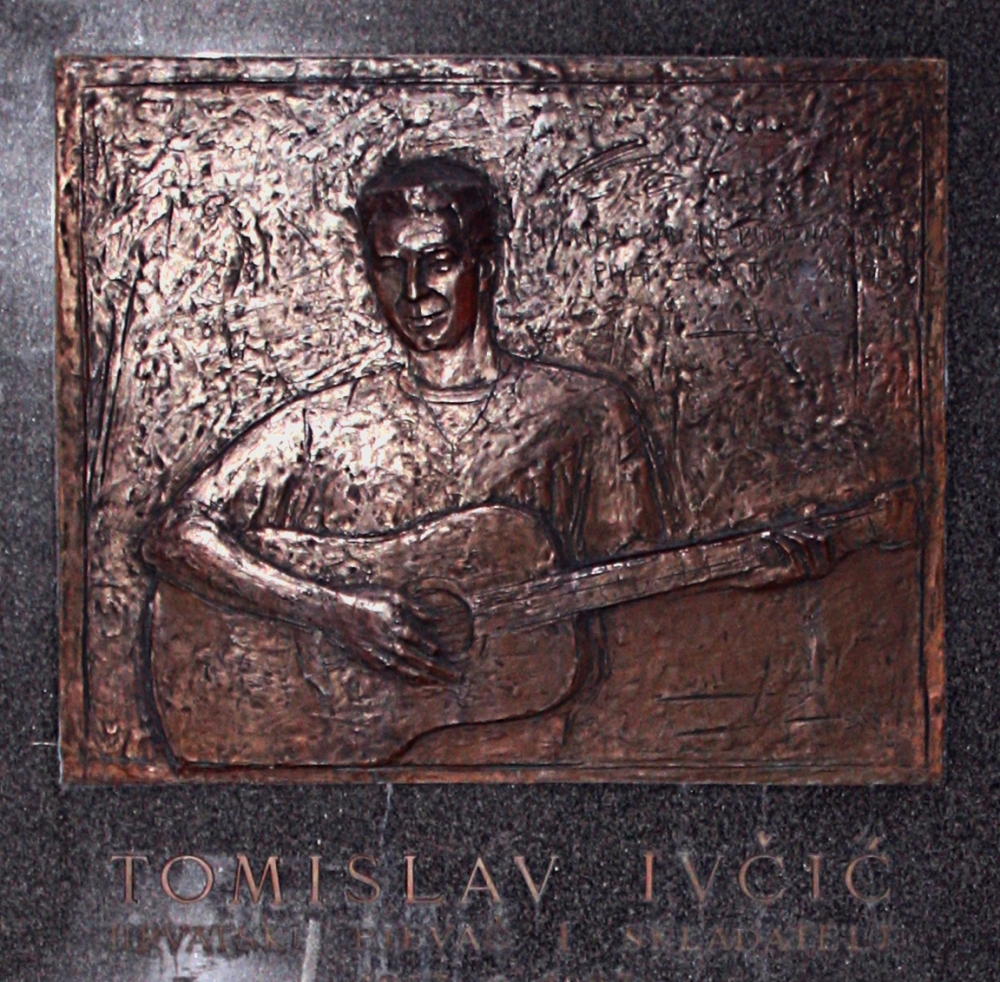
Ivčić

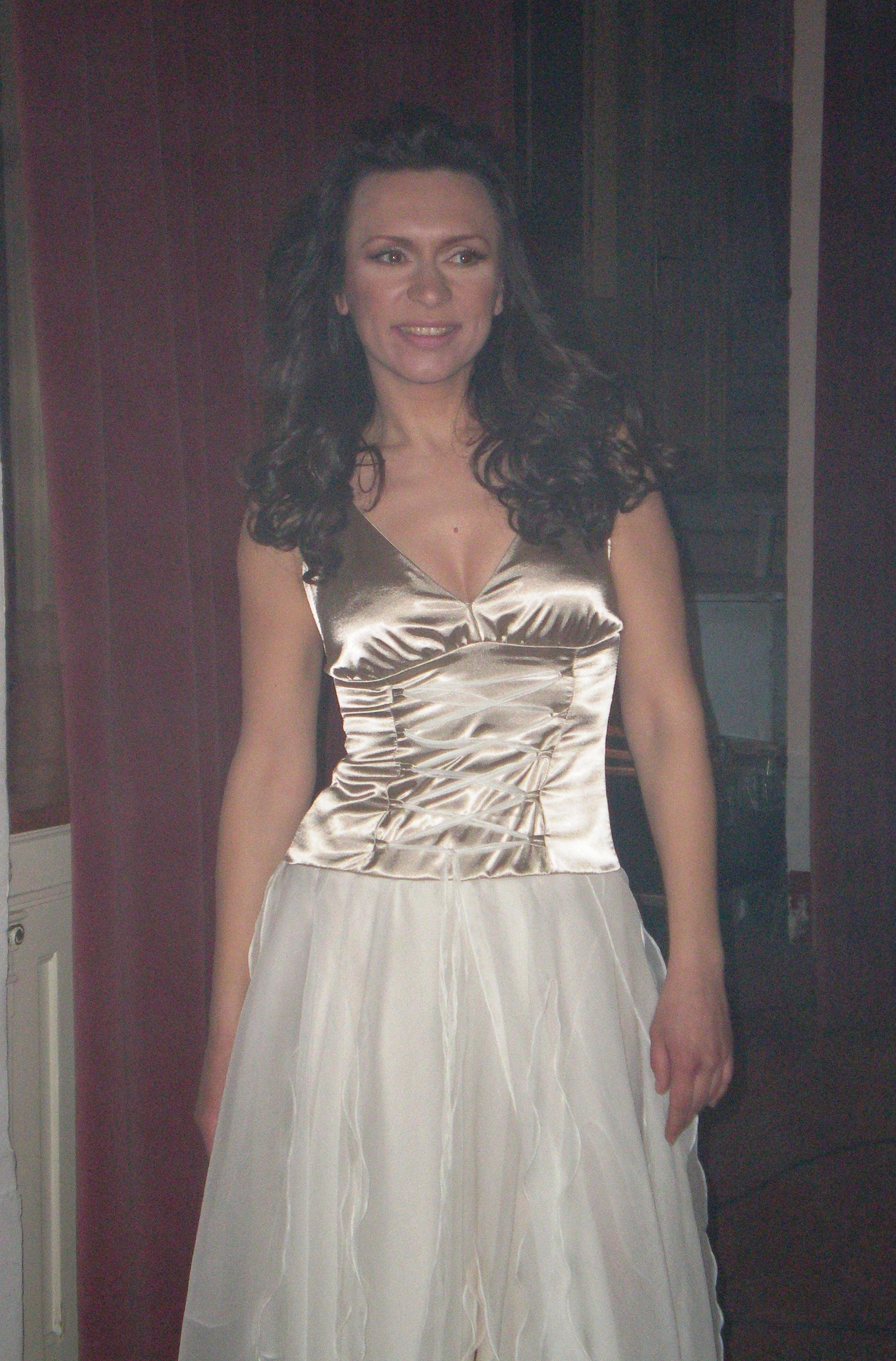
Kokić

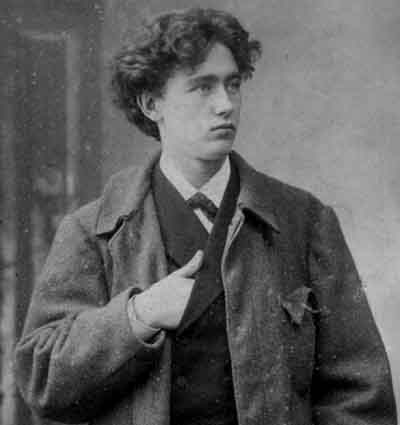
Weingartner

== Politicians ==
- Ingrid Antičević-Marinović (born 1957), lawyer, politician, Minister of Justice, Public Administration and Local Self-government, justice of the Constitutional Court
- Maks Baće (1914–2005), ambassador, revolutionary
- Sava Bjelanović (1850–1897), politician and journalist
- Andrea Cippico, (1877–1935), Italian senator
- Igor Crnadak (born 1972), politician
- Šime Đodan (1927–2007), politician
- Roberto Ghiglianovich, Italian senator and patriot
- Pavle Kalinić (born 1959), politician and writer
- Božidar Kalmeta (born 1958), politician and Mayor of Zadar
- Tomislav Karamarko (born 1959), politician and First Deputy Prime Minister of Croatia
- Sanja Lakić (born 1994), politician
- Neven Ljubičić (born 1963), politician
- Budimir Lončar (1924–2024), politician
- Milorad Pupovac (born 1955), politician
- Petar Škundrić (born 1947), politician
- Enrico Tivaroni (1841–1925), Italian senator and magistrate
- Lucio Toth (1934–2017), politician
- Slobodan Uzelac (born 1947), politician
- Giacomo Vuxani (1886–1964), politician
- Luigi Ziliotto, politician, podestà of Zadar (Zara) (1863–1922)
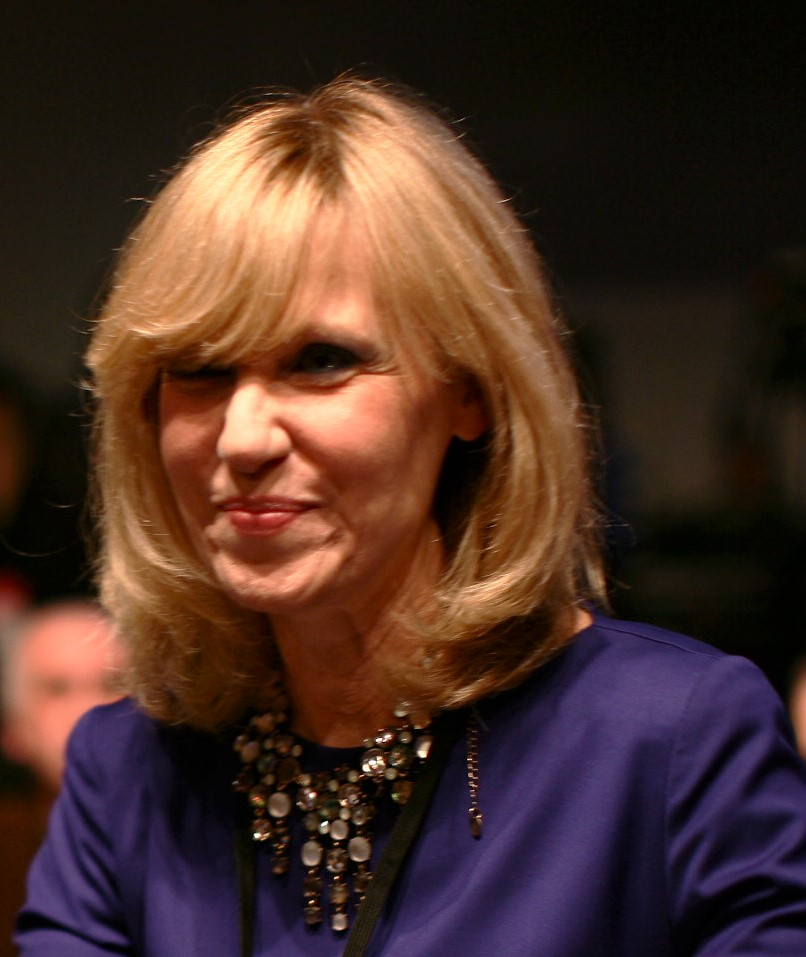
Antičević-Marinović

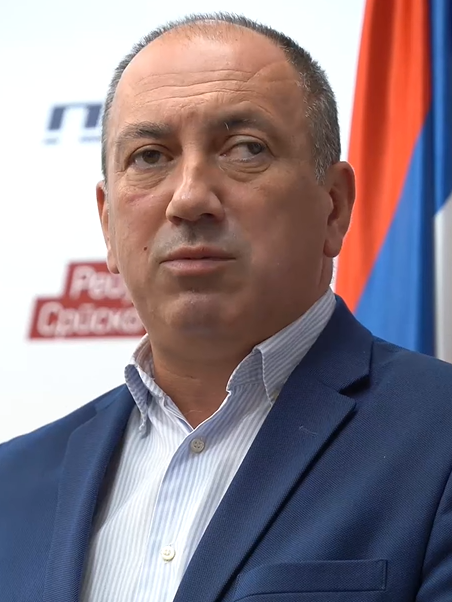
Crnadak

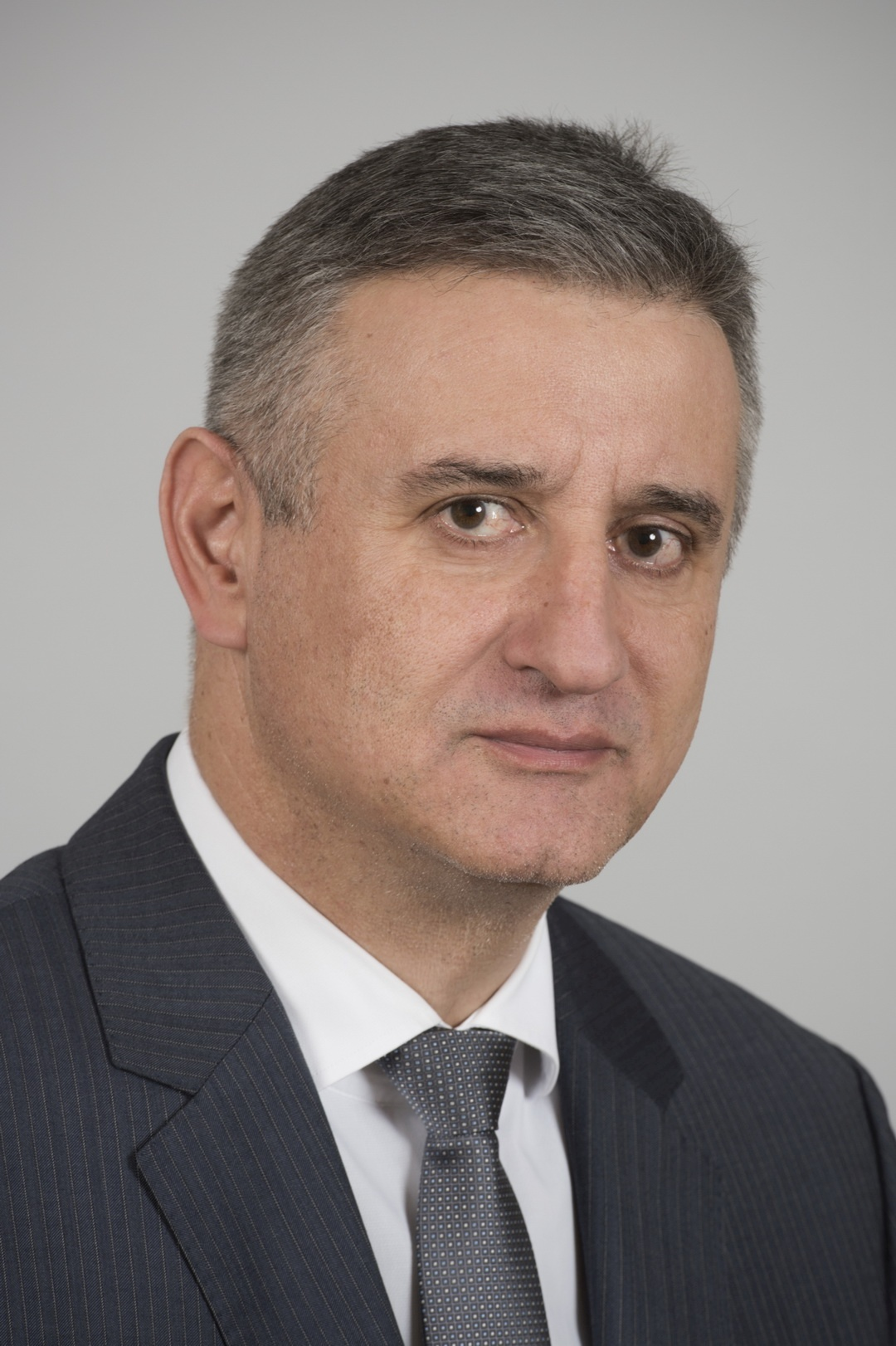
Karamarko

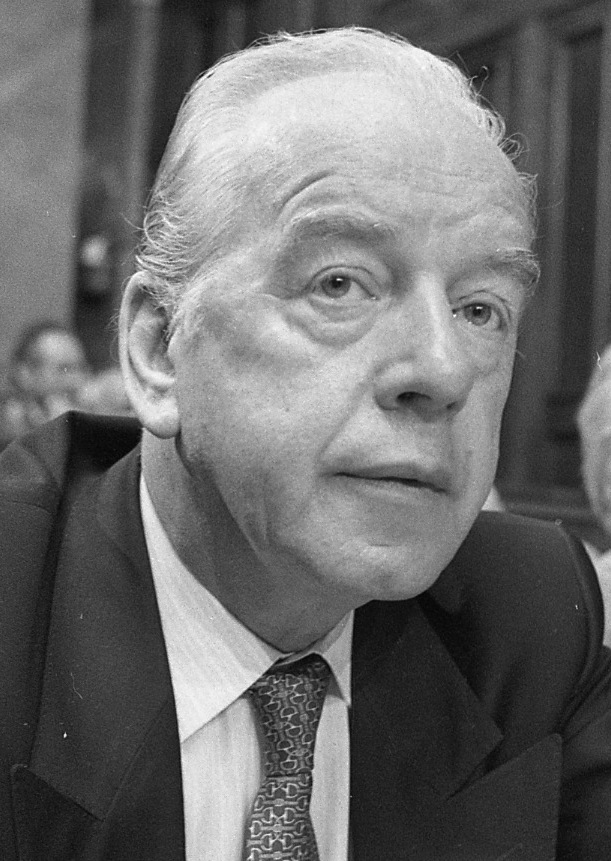
Lončar

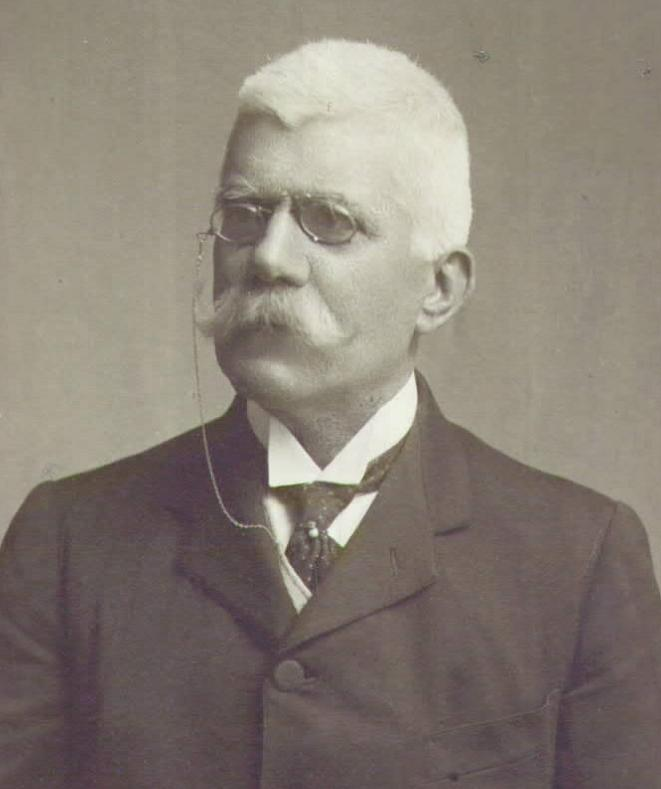
Tivaroni

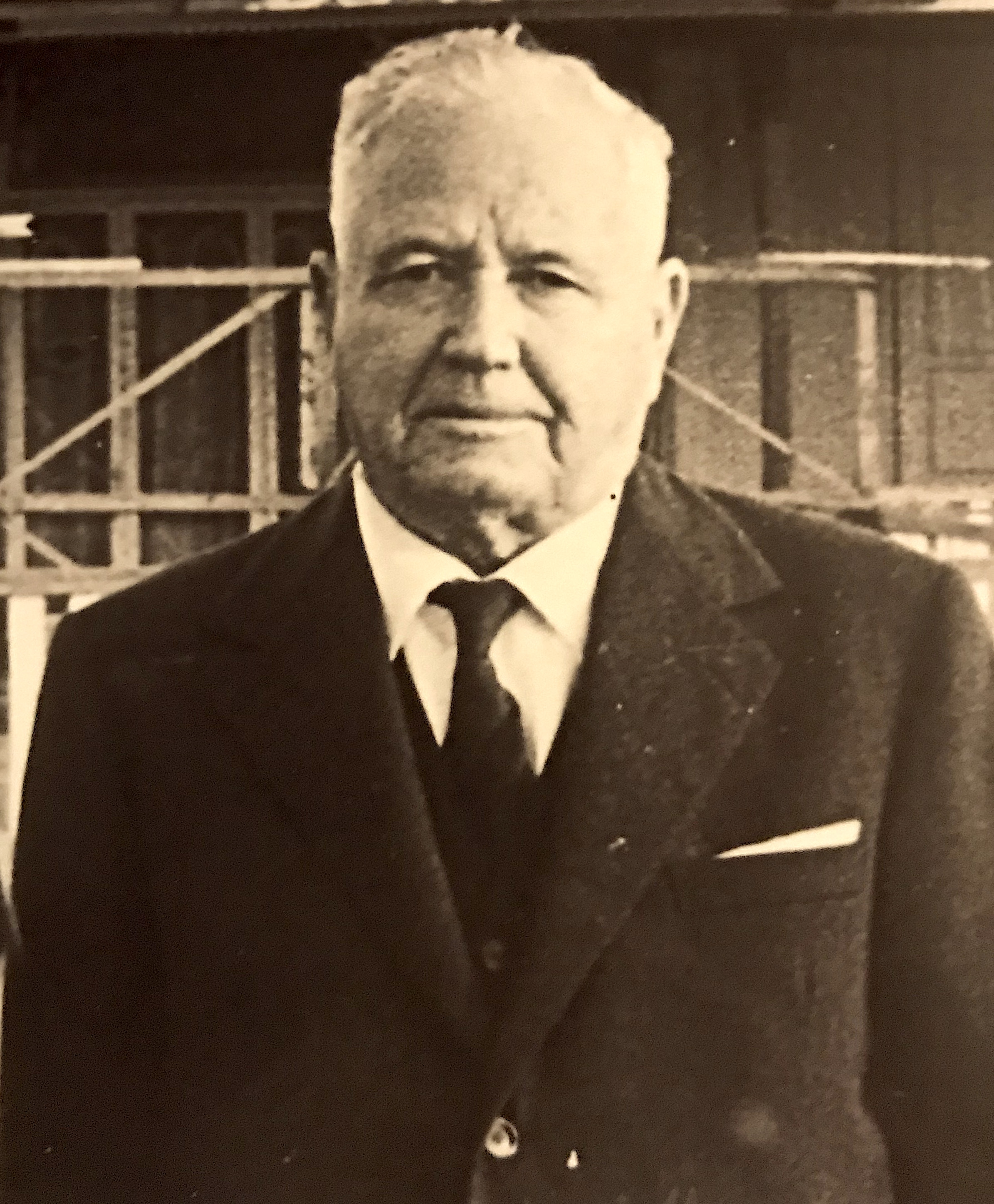
Vuxani

== Historians and scientists ==
- Silvio Ballarin (1901 – 1969), mathematician and university professor
- Zoran Bujas (1910–2004), psychiatrist
- Spiridon Brusina (1845 – 1909), malacologist
- Aldo Duro (1916–2000), linguist
- Giovanni Francesco Fortunio (ca. 1470–1517), grammarian, jurist and humanist.
- Renzo de' Vidovich (born 1934), politician, historian and journalist
- Jevrem Jezdić (1916 – 1997), historian, publicist, writer
- Boris Labar (born 1947), physician and scientist in the field of hematology and hematopoietic stem cell transplantation
- Josef Müller (1880–1964), entomologist
- Simone Stratigo (1733–1824), mathematician and a nautical science
- Carlo Tivaroni (1843–1906), historian and politician
- Carlo Viola (1855–1925), geologist
- Predrag Vranicki (1922–2002), Marxist humanist and philosopher
- Obrad Zelić (born in 1946), professor of parodontology and oral medicine
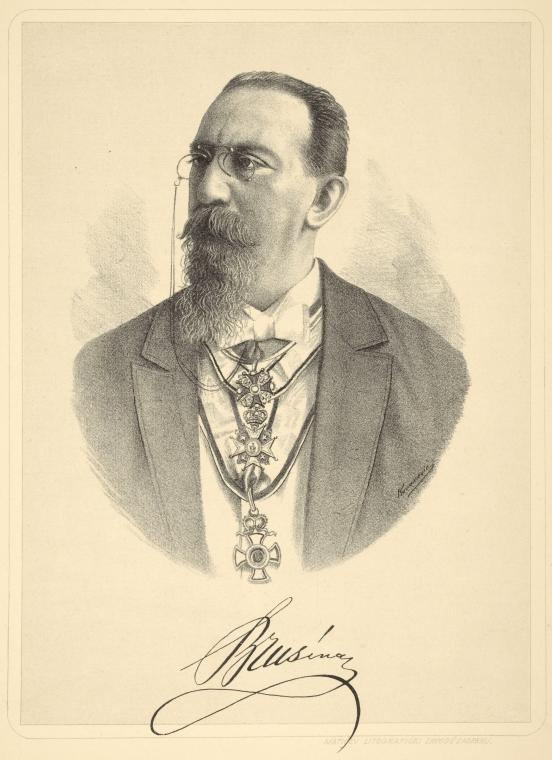
Brusina

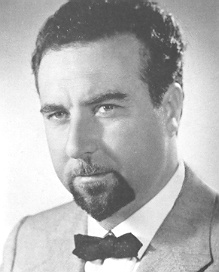
de' Vidovich

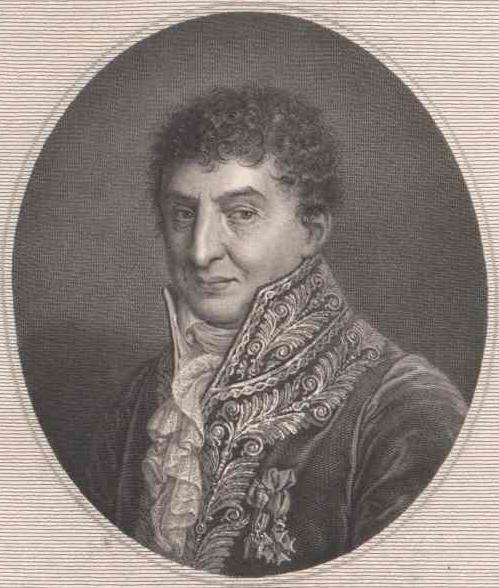
Stratigo

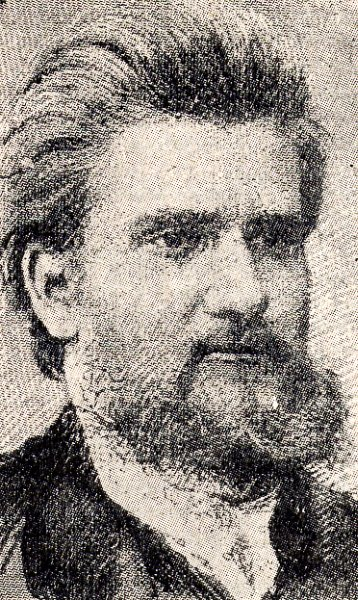
Tivaroni

== Athletes ==
- Vladan Alanović (born 1967), basketball player
- Romano Bajlo (born 1946), rower
- Marko Banić (born 1984), basketball player
- Ivan Batur (born 1991), basketball player
- Saša Bjelanović (born 1979), football player
- Ante Bukvić, football player
- Jurica Buljat (born 1986), football player
- Marijan Buljat (born 1981), football player
- Marjan Čakarun (born 1990), basketball player
- Antonio Cattalinich (Ante Katalinić) (1895–1981), rower
- Francesco Cattalinich (Frane Katalinić) (1891–1976), rower
- Simone Cattalinich (Šimun Katalinić) (1891–1976), rower
- Stefan Cebara (born 1991), football player
- Đorđe Čotra (born 1984), football player
- Ljubomir Crnokrak (born 1958), football manager
- Aleksandar Čubrilo (born 1975), basketball player
- Branko Culina (born 1957), football player and trainer
- Hrvoje Ćustić (1983–2008), football player
- Joey Didulica (born 1997), football player whose parents were from Zadar
- Toni Dijan (born 1983), basketball player
- Saša Dobrić (born 1982), football player
- Šime Fantela (born 1986), sailor
- Đorđe Gagić (born 1990), basketball player
- Latino Galasso (1898–1949), rower
- Josip (Giuseppe, "Pino") Gjergja (born 1937), basketball player
- Alan Gregov (born 1970), basketball player
- Šime Gregov (born 1989), footballer
- Petar Ivanov (rower) (Pietro Ivanov) (1894–1961), rower
- Danijel Jusup (born 1961), basketball coach
- Ratko Kacian (1917–1949), football player
- Arijan Komazec, basketball player
- Emilio Kovačić (born 1968), basketball player
- Ante Krapić (born 1985), basketball player
- Marko Jagodić-Kuridža (born 1987), basketball player
- Dominik Livaković (born 1995), football player
- Mark Liveric (born 1953), football player
- Viktor Ljubić (Vittorio Gliubich) (1902–1984), rower
- Korana Longin-Zanze (born 1973), basketball player
- Oliver Maric (born 1981), football player
- Petar Marić (born 1987), basketball player
- Dominik Mavra (born 1994), basketball player
- Vladimir Milić (born 1955), shot putter
- Roko Mišlov (born 1988), football player
- Luka Modrić (born 1985), football player
- Vedran Morović (born 1983), basketball player
- Ivan Ninčević (born 1981), handball player
- Ivan Novačić (born 1985), basketball player
- Bernarda Pera (born 1994), tennis player
- Joseph Plachutta (1827–1883), chess player
- Nikola Plećaš (born 1948), basketball player
- Marko Popović (born 1982), basketball player
- Herdi Prenga (born 1994), football player
- Zoran Primorac (born 1969), table tennis player
- Dado Pršo (born 1974), football player
- Milan Pršo (born 1990), football player
- Marija Režan (born 1989), basketball player
- Tullio Rochlitzer (1926–2006), basketball player and coach
- Ivan Santini (born 1989), football player
- Josip Skoblar (born 1941), football player
- Branko Skroče (born 1955), basketball player
- Bruno Sorić (Bruno Sorich) (1904–1942), rower
- Enzo Sovitti (1926–1969), basketball player and coach
- Danijel Subašić (born 1984), football player
- Marin Tomasov (born 1987), football player
- Carlo Toniatti (1892–1968), rower
- Sergio Vatta (1937–2020), football coach
- Dušan Vemić (born 1976), tennis player
- Dalibor Veselinović (born 1987), football player
- Jakov Vladović (born 1983), basketball player
- Stojko Vranković (born 1964), basketball player
- Luka Žorić (born 1984), basketball player
- Tomislav Zubčić (born 1990), basketball player
- Jurica Žuža (born 1978), basketball player
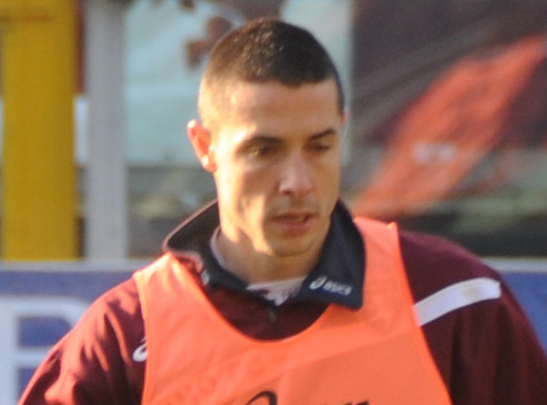
Bjelanović

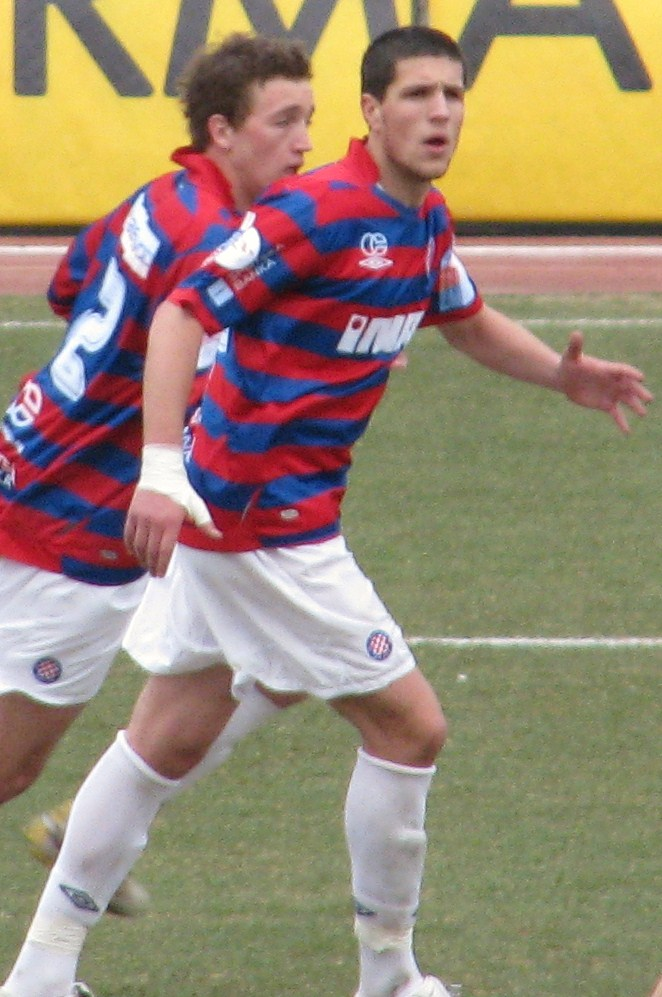
Buljat

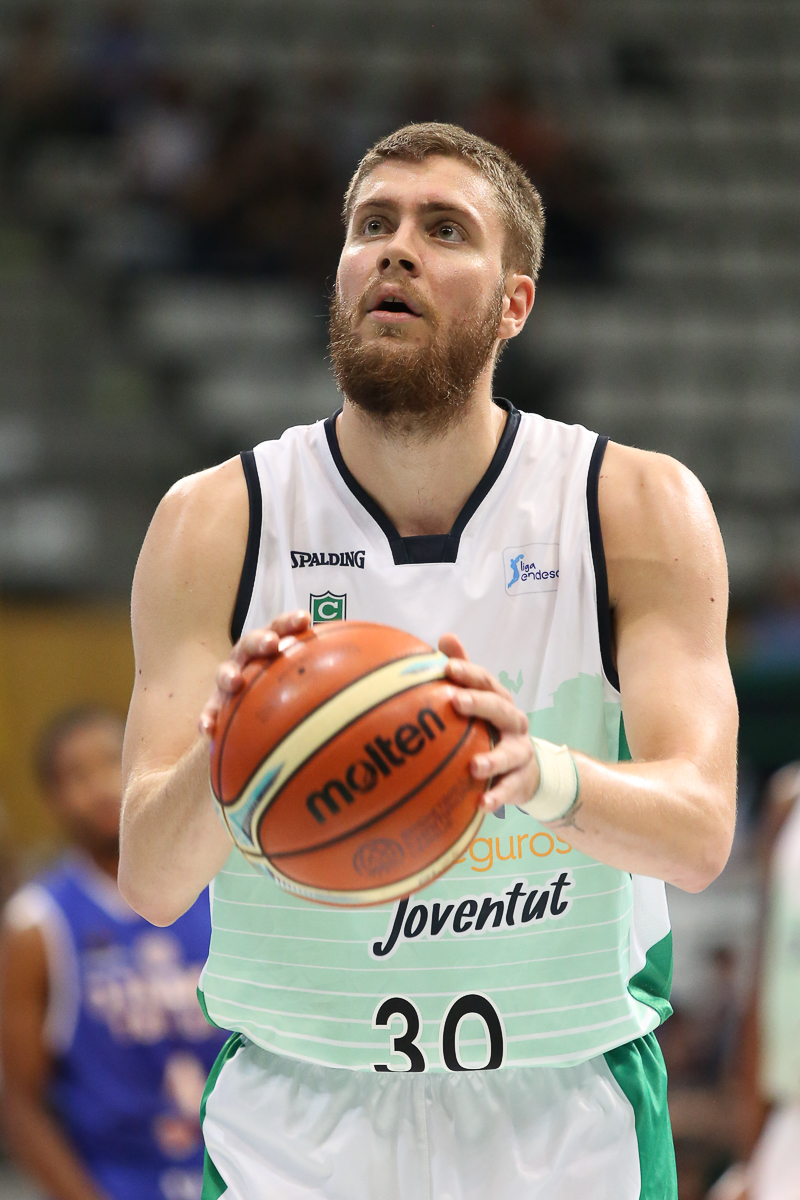
Mavra

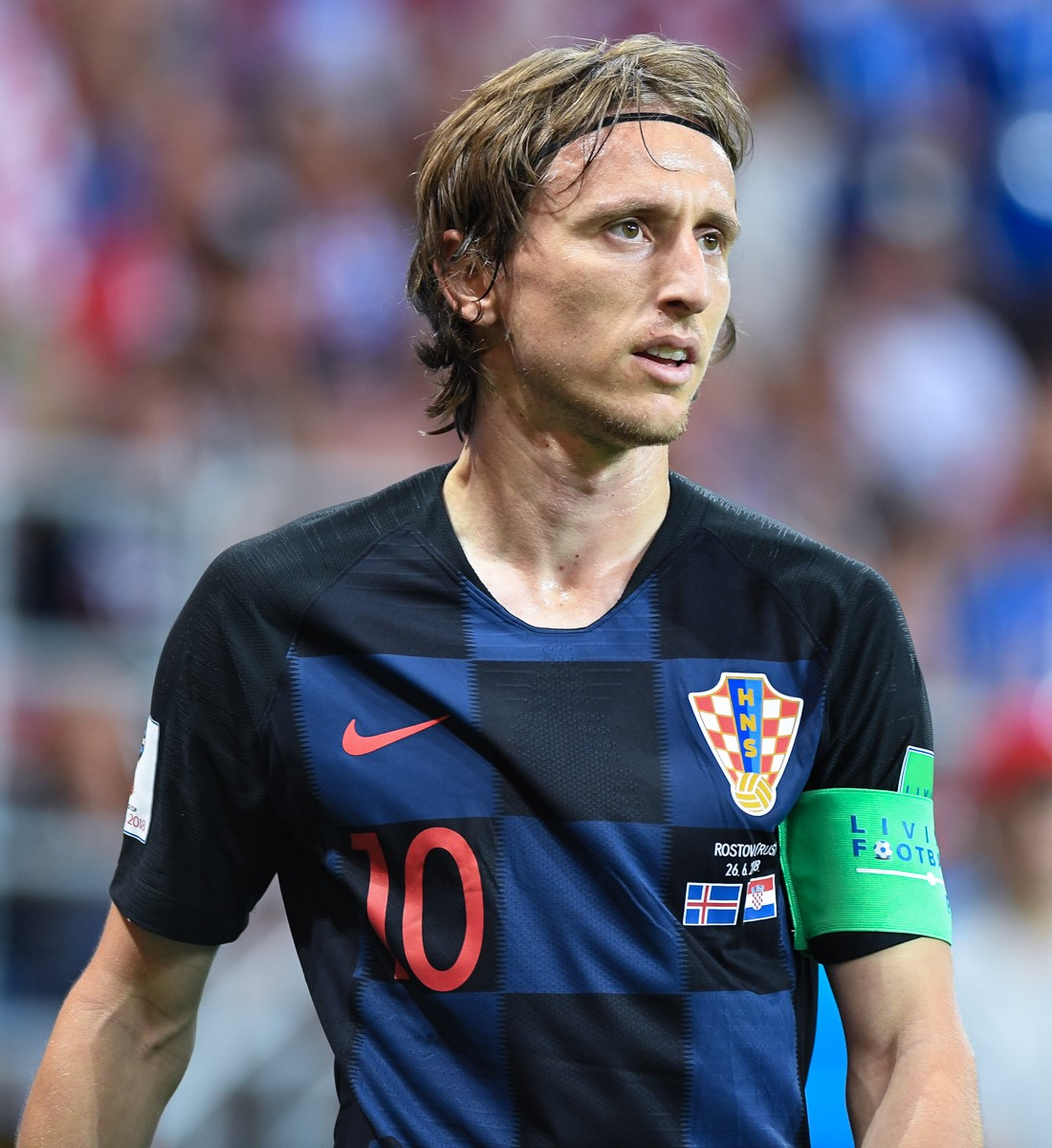
Modrić

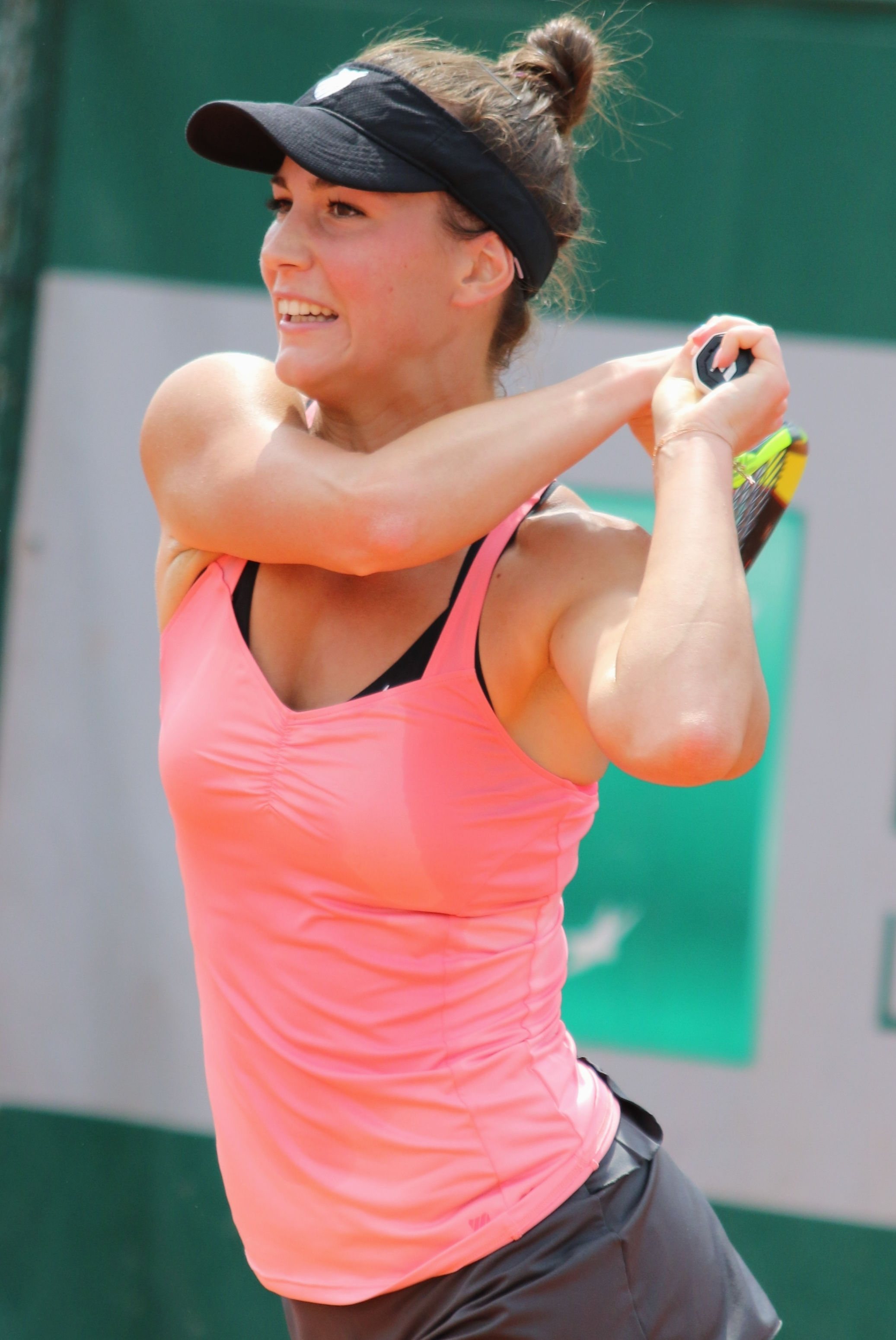
Pera

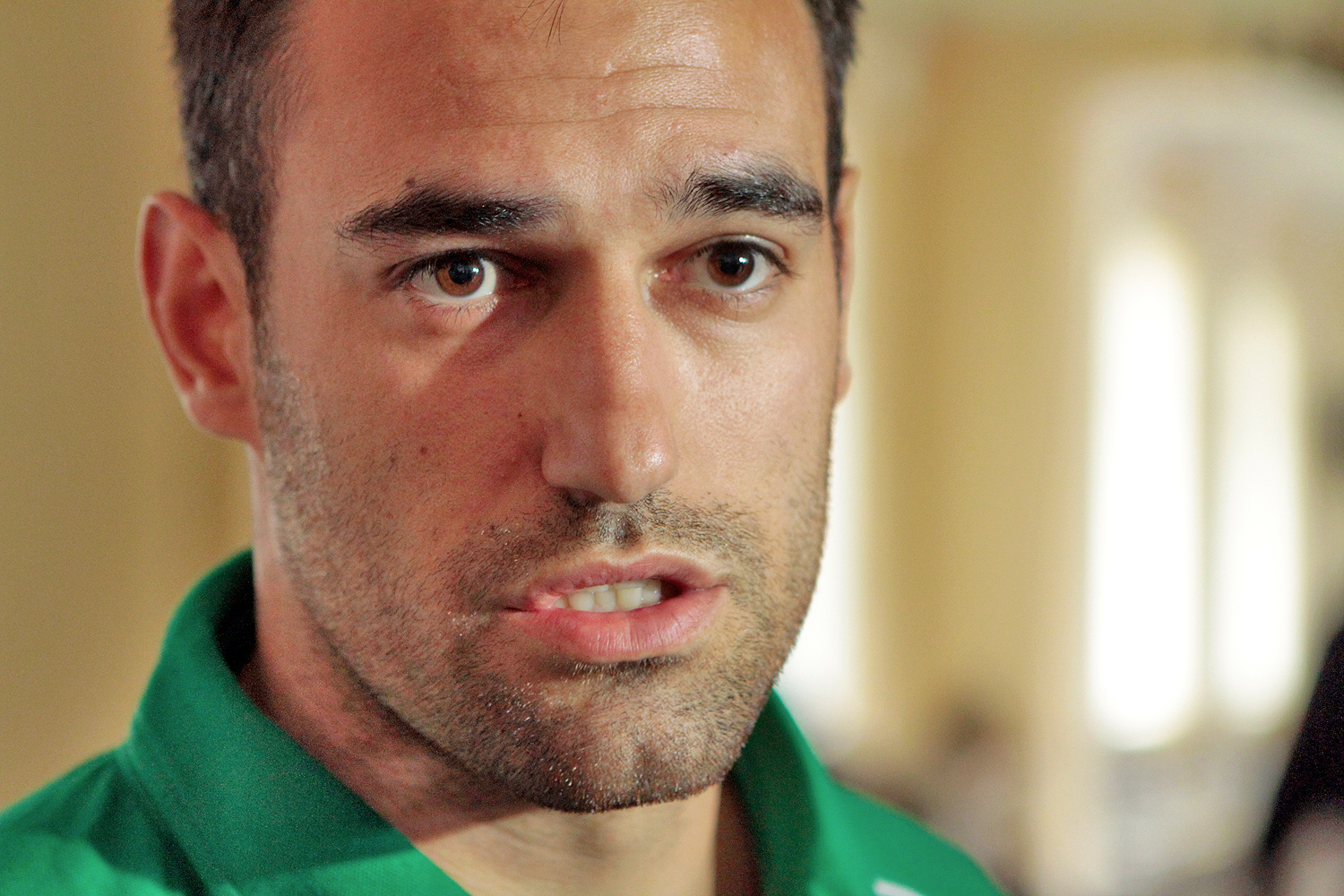
Popović

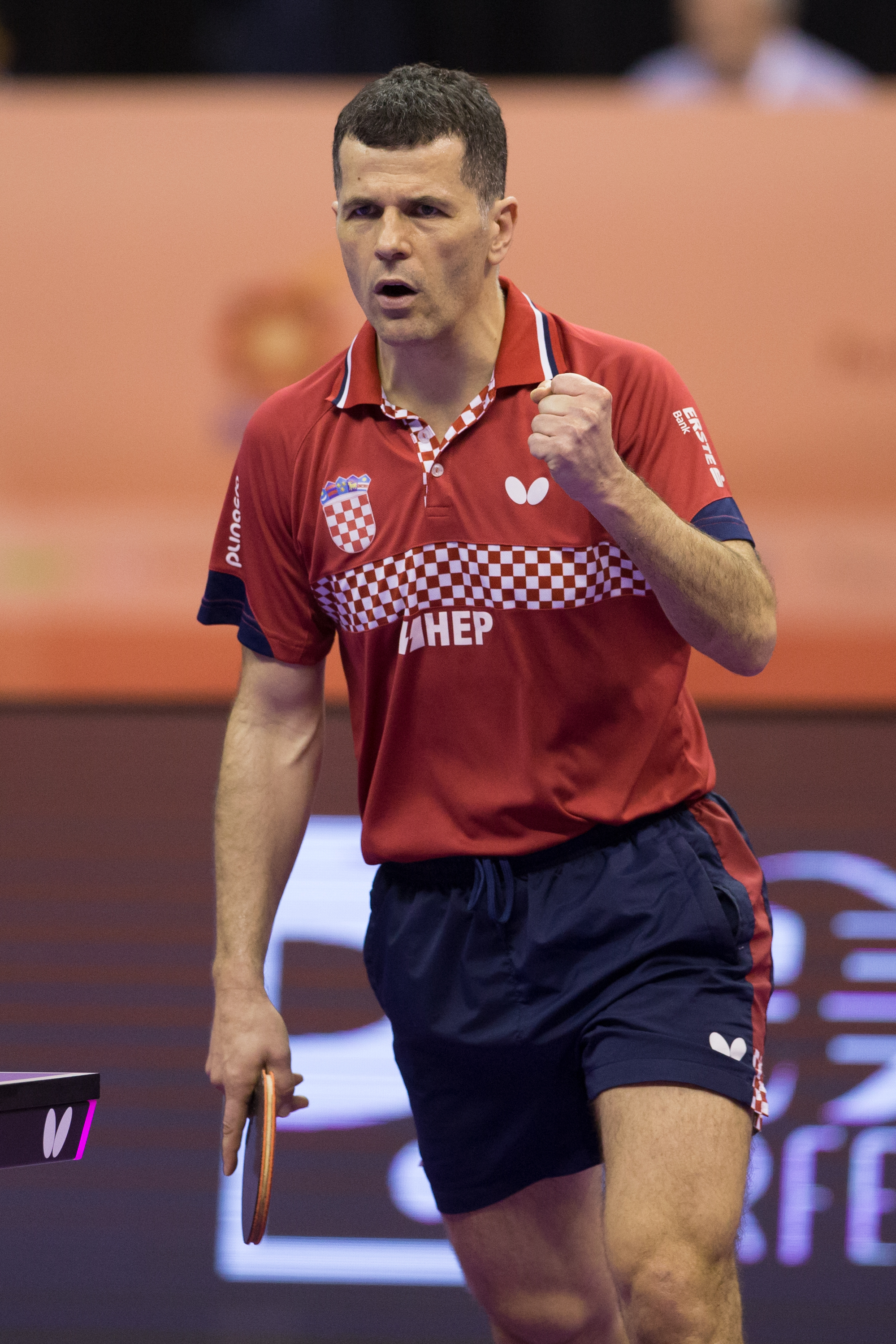
Primorac

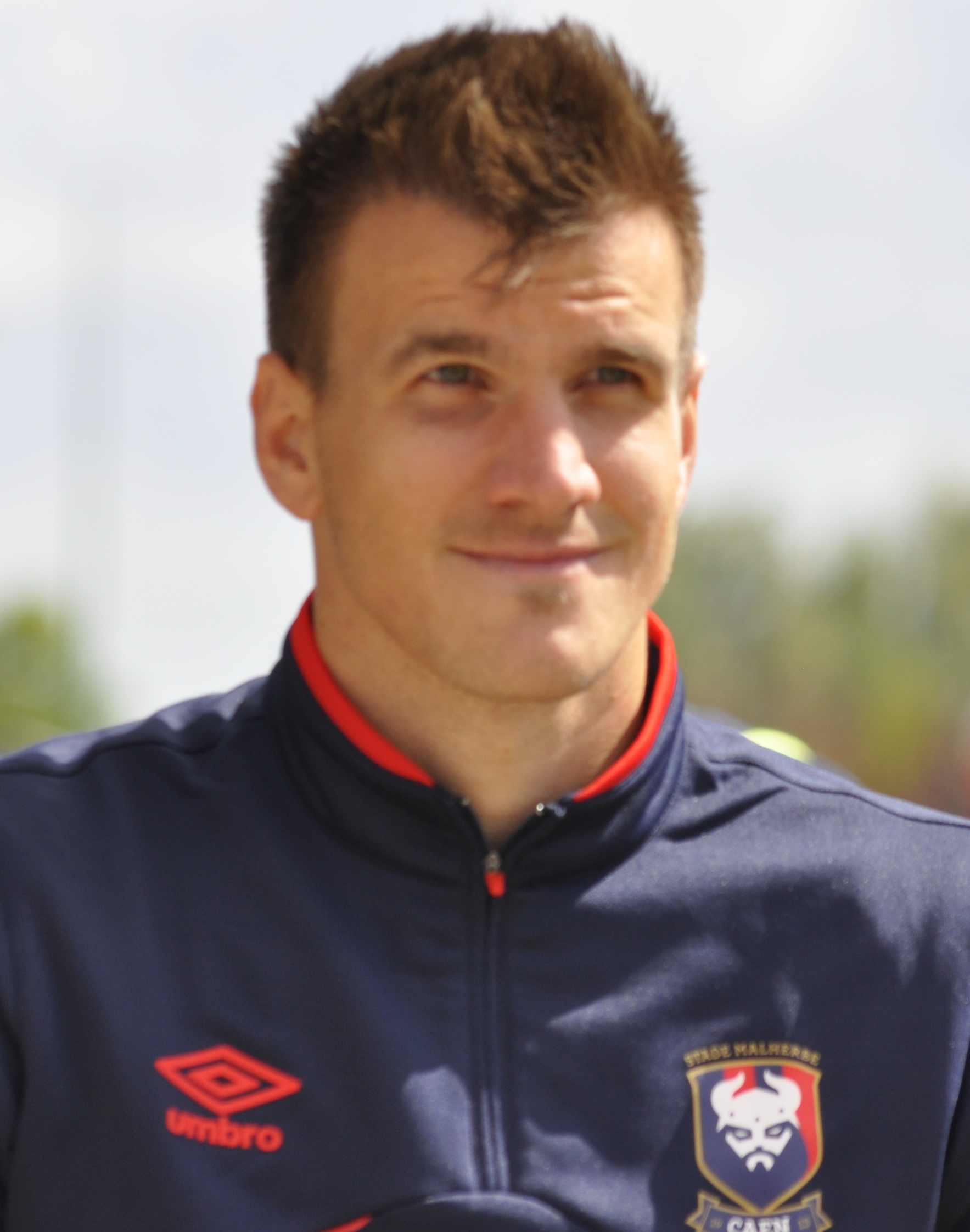
Santini

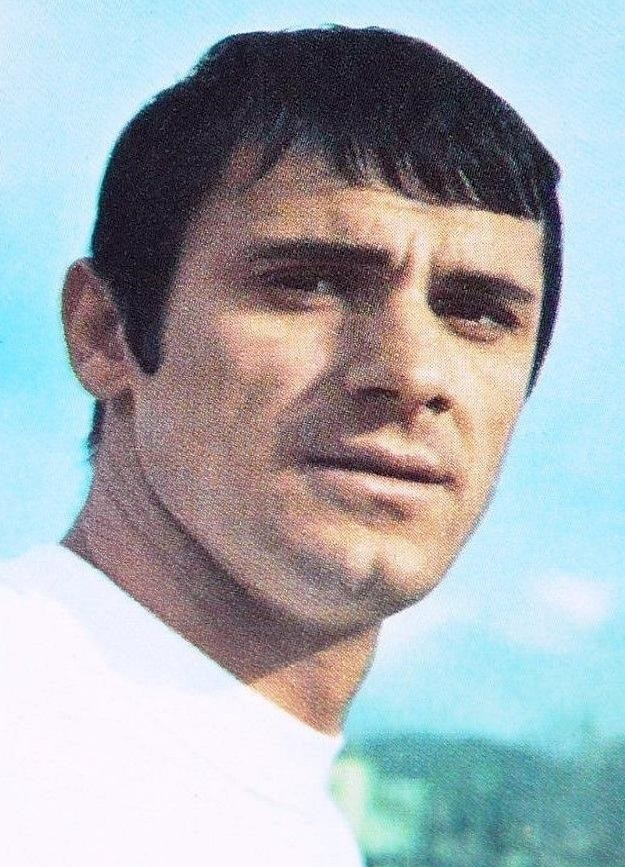
Skoblar

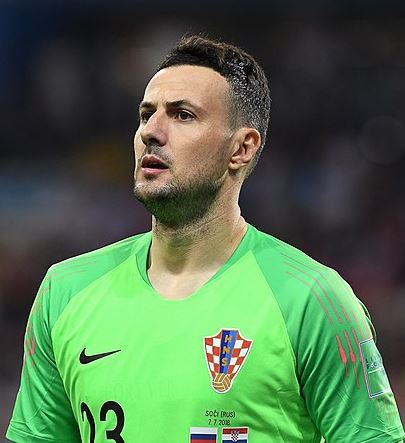
Subašić

== Religion ==
- Šime Budinić (17th century), priest
- Čika (died 1095), founder of the Benedictine monastery of St. Mary
- Donatus of Zadar, Catholic saint and bishop
- Gregory of Nin (10th century), bishop active in the area of Nin
- Pope John IV (died 12 October 642) reigned from 24 December 640 to his death in 642.
- Simeon Končarević, Serbian Orthodox bishop
- Nikolaj Mandić (1840–1907), theologian
- Marijan Oblak (1919–2008), Roman Catholic archbishop of the Archdiocese of Zadar
- Ivan Prenđa (1939–2010), Roman Catholic archbishop of the Archdiocese of Zadar
- Jakov Varingez (1400–1496), Roman Catholic professed religious of the Order of Friars Minor
- Vekenega (died 1111), abbess of the Benedictine monastery of St. Mary
- Gerasim Zelić (1752–1828), Serbian Orthodox Church archimandrite, traveller and writer
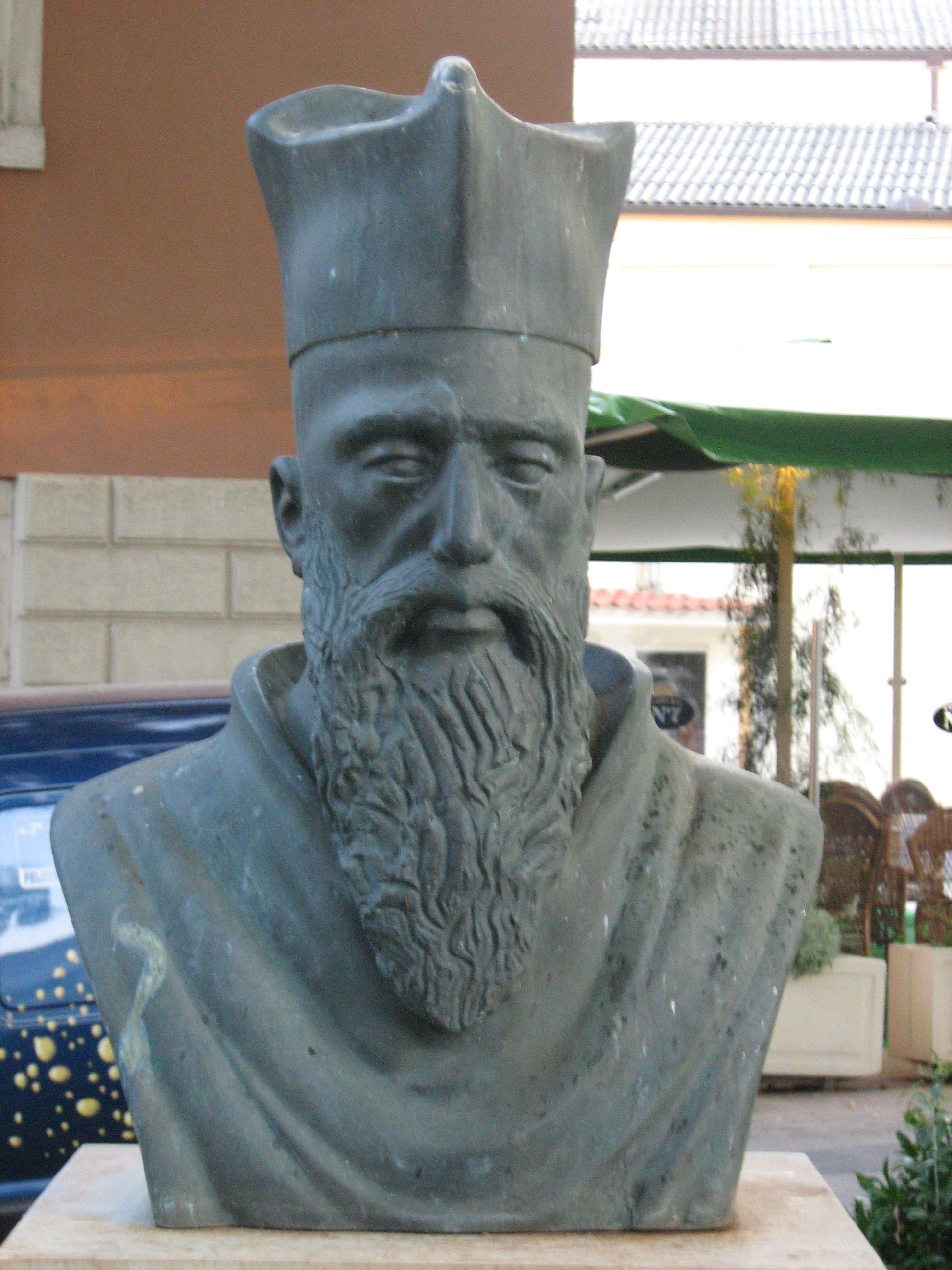
Budinić

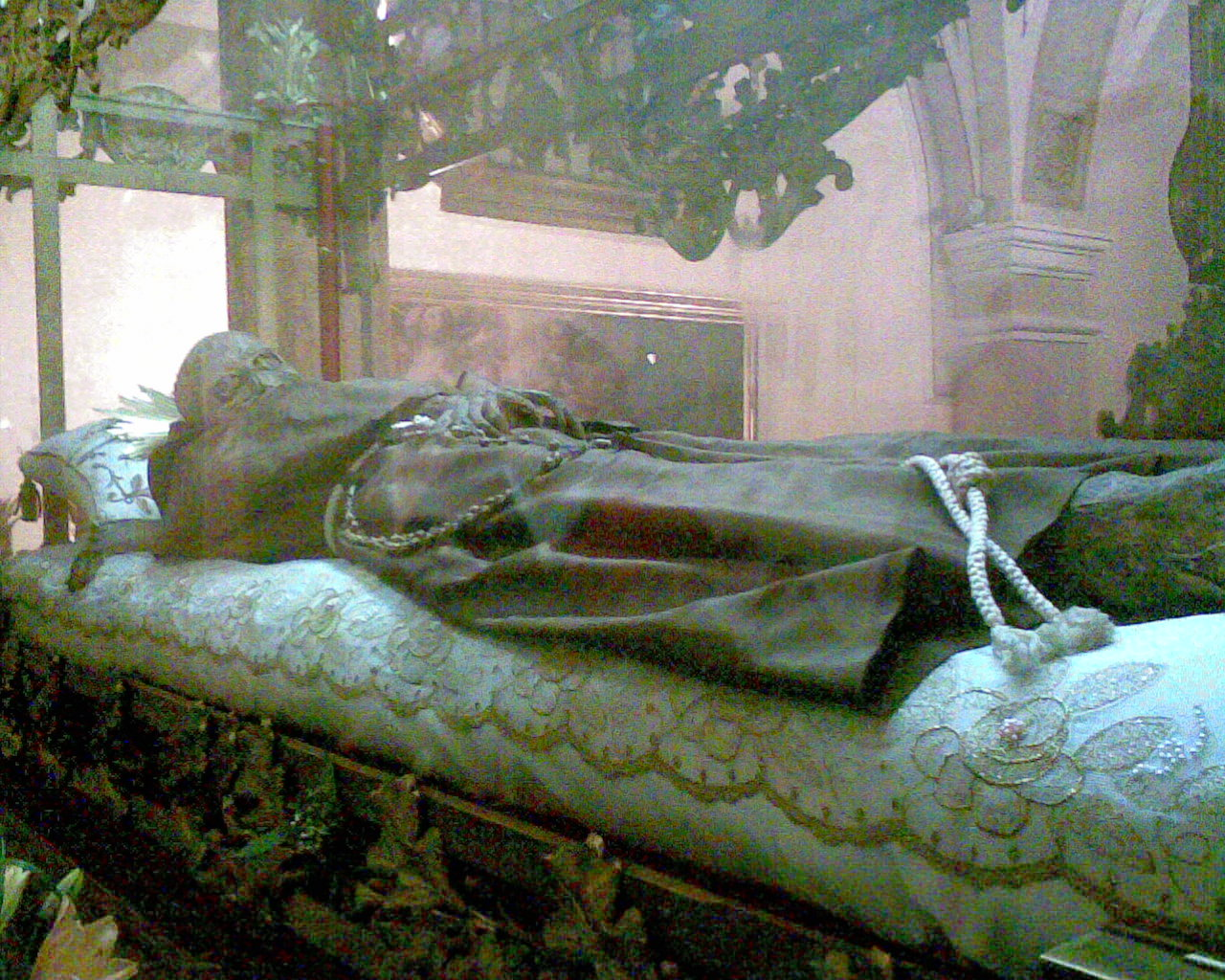
Jakov Varingez

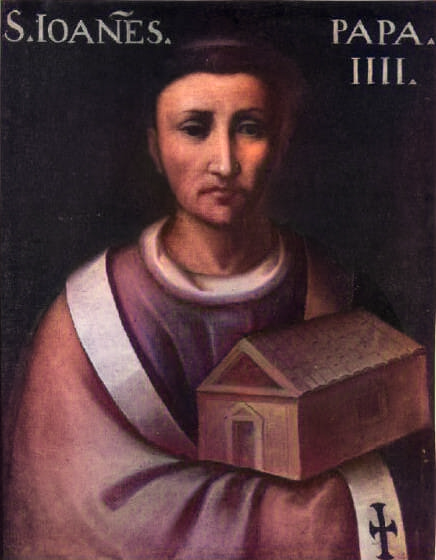
John IV

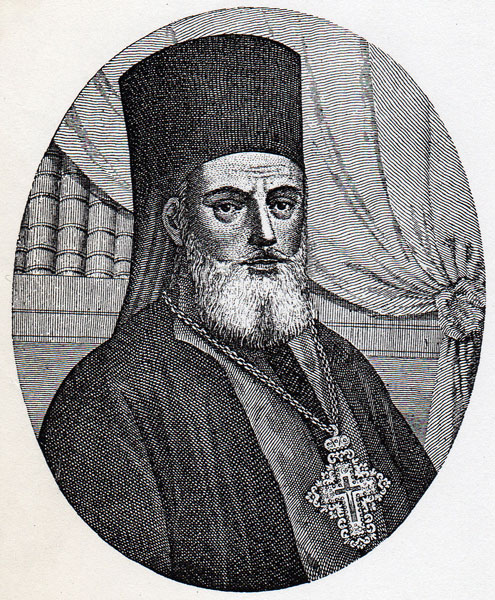
Zelić

== Other ==
- Helen of Zadar (?-976), queen consort of the Kingdom of Croatia
- Toni Jeričević (born 1983), businessman, actor, TV host
- Franco Luxardo (born 1936), entrepreneur and fencer
- Girolamo Luxardo (1784–1865), entrepreneur, diplomat
- Girolamo Manfrin (1742–1801), entrepreneur
- Joanna II of Naples (1373–1435), Queen of Naples
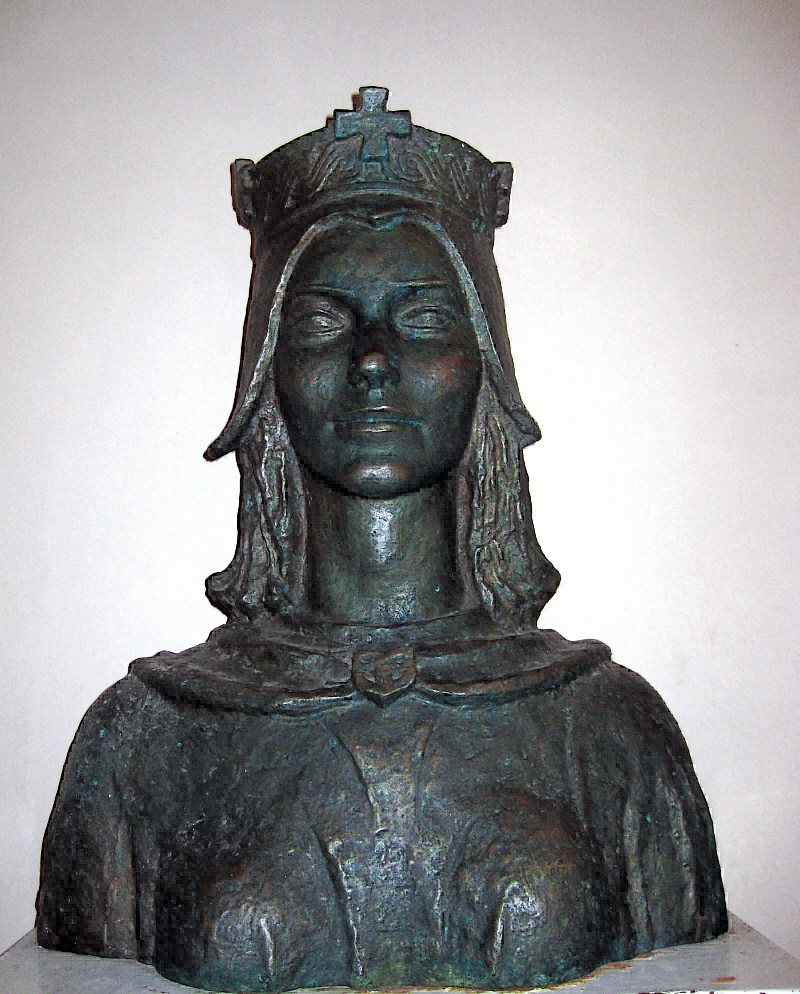
Helen

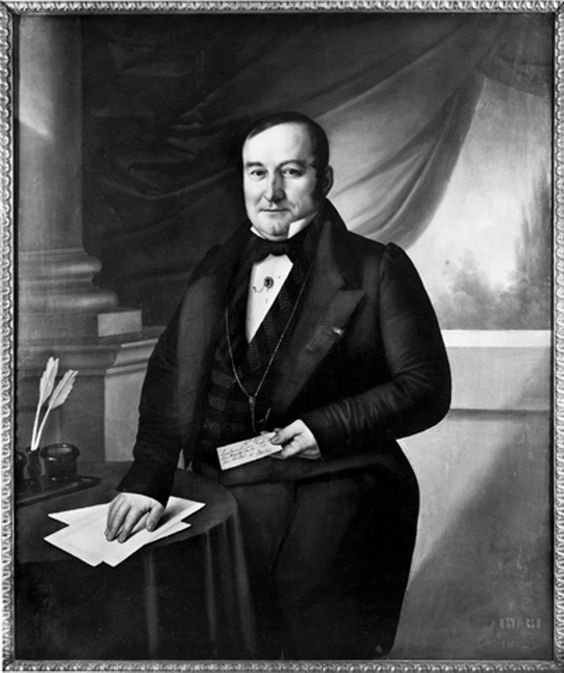
Luxardo
