= Carlo Tivaroni =

Dalmatian Italian historian and politician

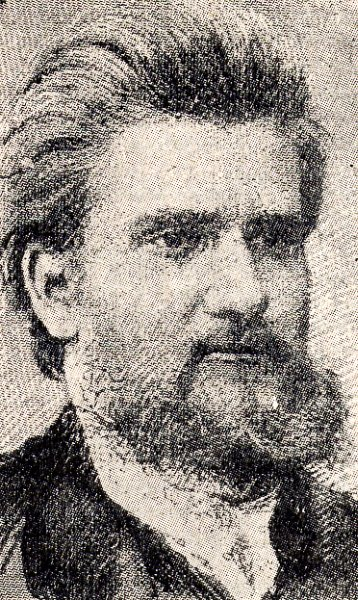
- A portrait of Carlo Tivaroni.
- Born: Carlo Tivaroni; 1843; Zara, Dalmatia, Austrian Empire
- Died: 1906 (aged 62–63); Venice, Italy
- Occupations: Mathematics, Nautical science

Carlo Tivaroni (1843 – 1906) was a Dalmatian Italian historian and politician. He was born in Zara (Croatian: Zadar), which at the time still had a significant Italian component and was part of Austrian Empire. He was the brother of Senator Enrico Tivaroni. He has been credited as the first historian of the Risorgimento.

== Sources ==
- M. Rosi: Dizionario del Risorgimento nazionale, IV, Milano 1937
- M. Perlini: Carlo Tivaroni, garibaldino e primo storico del Risorgimento italiano, in Atti e memorie della Società dalmata di storia patria, V (1966) pp. 383-472
- P. De Marchi: ll Veneto tra Risorgimento e unificazione. Partecipazione volontaria (1848-1866) e rappresentanza parlamentare: deputati e senatori veneti (1866-1900), Venice 2011
- W. Maturi: Intepretazioni del Risorgimento, Turin 1962
- A. Galante Garrone: Carlo Tivaroni: come divenne storico del Risorgimento, in Rivista storica italiana, LXXIX (1967), 2, pp. 313–354
- P. Finelli: Mazzini nella storiografia italiana dell’età liberale, in Bollettino della Domus Mazziniana, XXXIX (1993), 2, pp. 135–151
