= Simone Stratigo =

Dalmatian Italian Greek mathematician and nautical science expert

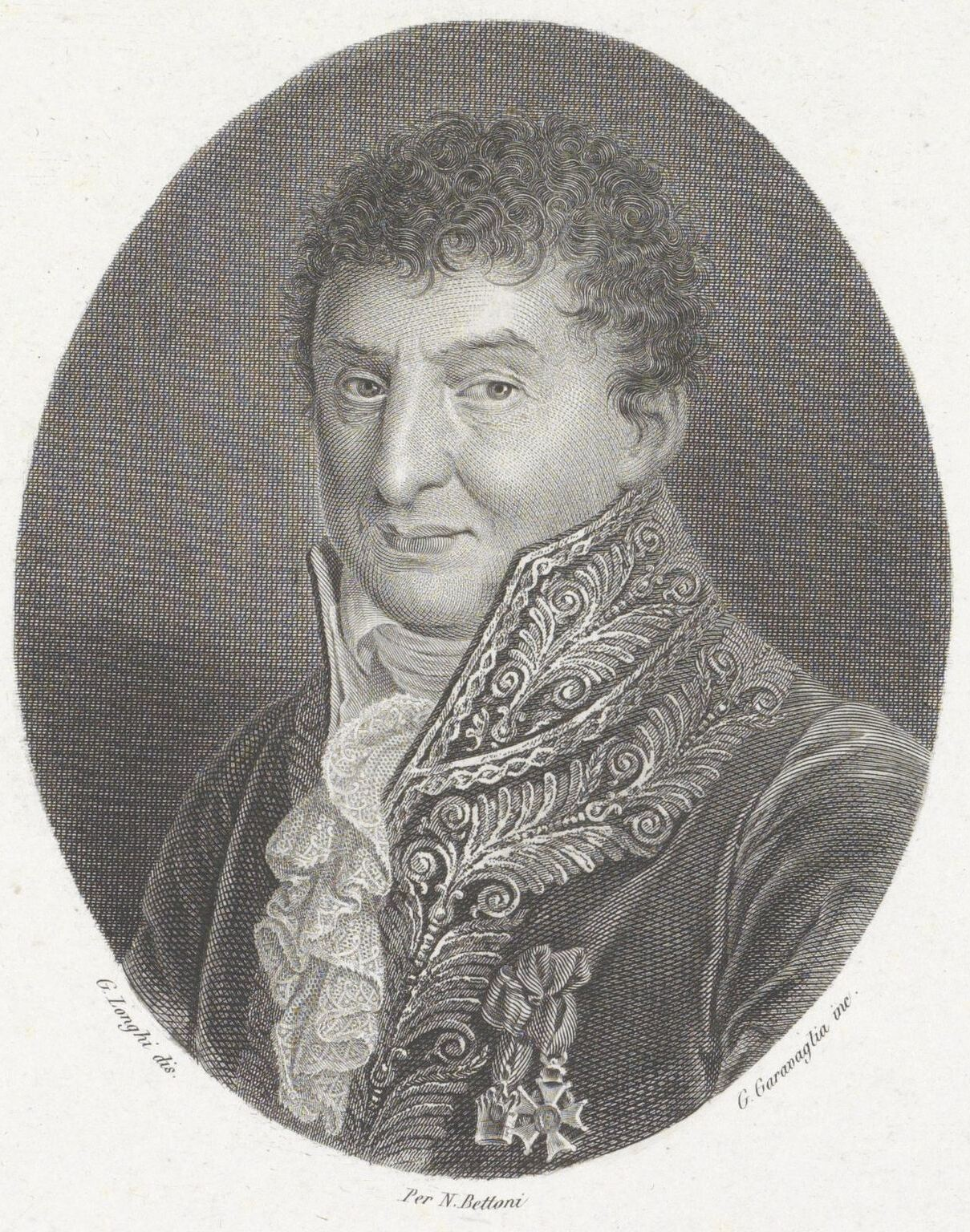
- A portrait of Simone Stratigo.
- Born: Symeon Filippos Stratigos; 1733; Zara, Dalmatia, Republic of Venice
- Died: 1824 (aged 90–91); Milan, Italy
- Occupations: Mathematics, Nautical science

Simone Stratigo (Greek: Συμεών Φίλιππος Στρατηγός, Symeon Filippos Stratigos; Italian: Simone Filippo Stratico; 1733–1824) was a Dalmatian Italian Greek mathematician and a nautical science expert who studied and lived in Padua and Pavia in 18th-century Italy.

== Biography ==
Simone Stratigo was born in 1733 as Symeon Filippos Stratigos to a family of Greek origin in Zara (modern Zadar in Croatia), part of Venetian Dalmatia at the time. His father, Michele Stratico, was a prominent violinist and musical composer. His family were originally from Candia, Crete and had migrated to Dalmatia due to the Ottoman conquest of Crete in 1669. While still young, Simone and his brother studied in the University of Padua under the discipline of their uncle Antonio Stratico (Antonios Stratigos), who was an educated man, especially in things Greek, and was director of the Cottunio Greek college at the time. Stratigo graduated in medicine from the University of Padua, where at the age of twenty-five years he became a professor.

He was a member of the delegation who traveled from Venice to England in 1761 to congratulate the new King George III, he remained in the country a few years to study and became a member of various academies including the Royal Society of London. At that time he was greatly impressed by the size and economic strength of the British navy. He soon moved back in Padua, where he replaced Giovanni Poleni the chair of Mathematics and Navigation. In this capacity, he studied extensively the water regime of the Republic of Venice, collaborating with various interventions in hydraulics. He participated in cleaning up the valleys of Verona and the regulation of the Brenta and Bacchiglione. In 1786, he joined as an ordinary member of the Accademia dei XL.

With the fall of the Republic in 1801 he was invited to teach nautical science at the University of Pavia, and he also studied the teaching of physics under Alessandro Volta. During the Napoleonic Kingdom of Italy was appointed Inspector General of Bridges and Roads, and among other positions he was President of the Academy of Fine Arts and Sciences Institute of Lombardy in Milan. In recognition of his work, he was elected senator in 1809. He received several international awards, including the title of Knight of the Legion of Honor and of the Iron Crown. The Emperor Francis I of Austria awarded him the Cross of the Order of Leopold, and the title of Professor Emeritus of the University of Padua and Pavia. Simone Stratigo died in Milan, Italy on 16 July 1824.

== Works ==
The most important scientific contributions of Stratigo were in the field of physics, hydraulics and naval architecture. Of the roughly 35 works that he left, the most memorable are (in chronological order):

- Raccolta di proposizioni d'idrostatica e d'idraulica, Padova 1773
- Teoria compita della costruzione e del maneggio dei bastimenti (traduzione annotata dell'opera in francese di Eulero), Padova 1776
- Elementi d'idrostatica e d'idraulica, Padova 1791
- Vocabolario di marina nelle tre lingue Italiana, Inglese e Francese, Milano, 1813–1814
- Bibliografia di marina, Milano 1823
