= Giorgio Ventura =

Italian painter

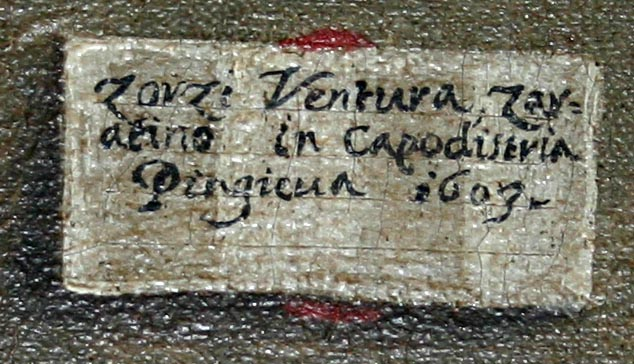
Signature of Giorgio Ventura.

Giorgio Ventura (also Zorzi Ventura) was an Italian mannerist painter of the Venetian school, active mainly in Venice, Istria and Dalmatia at the turn of the 16th and 17th centuries.

== Life ==
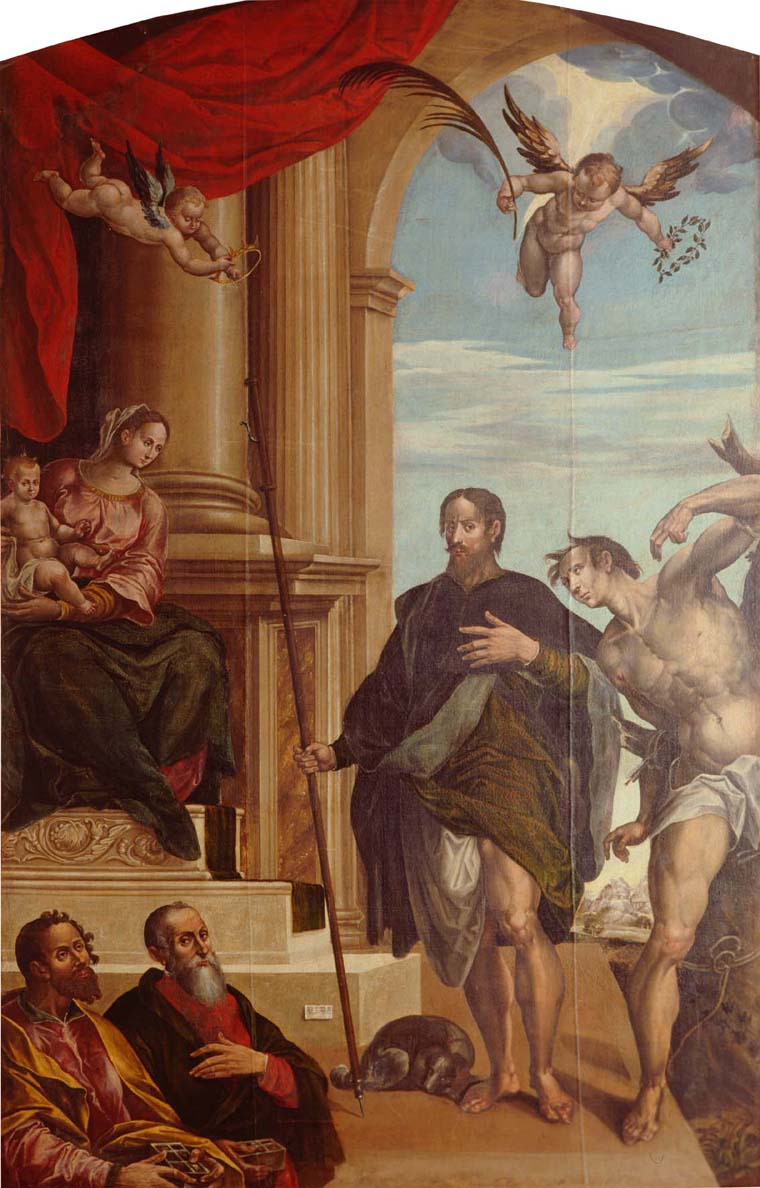
Madonna and Child with Saints Roch and Sebastian.

At present, almost nothing is known about his life, except what written from the cartouche of one of his most famous paintings, a Madonna and Child with Saints Sebastian and Roch, held in the parish church of Izola in which he wrote Zorzi Ventura Zaratino in Capodistria Pingieva 1603.

Born probably in Zadar, Dalmatia in an unknown year, most likely the second half of the 16th century, he left only one painting in Dalmatia: the Virgin with Six Saints, in the small church of the Franciscans on the island of St. Paul, near Zadar.

Traditionally it is believed that his activities in Venice and Istria began in 1598 when he signed and dated an Ultima Cena now kept in the parish church of Fažana. In 1607 he signed his latest Istrian work: the Concert of St. Cecilia in the church of St. Cecilia of Vabriga (close to Poreč). Ventura is no longer mentioned thereafter.

He knew and studied Vittore Carpaccio and Girolamo Santacroce. The architecture and background of the paintings of Izola and Villa Decani suggest the knowledge of other painters of the Venetian tradition.

== Works ==
In addition to the already mentioned painting, the following are attributed to Giorgio Ventura:

- Our Lady of the Rosary (apotheosis of Christian victory at Lepanto) – Parish Church of Višnjan. Signed and dated 1598.
- Madonna with Saints – Church of Villa Decani. Signed and dated 1600.
- Madonna and Saints – Parish Church of Vižinada. Signed and dated 1602.
- Deposition – Church of Vabriga. Unsigned and undated.
- St. Florian – Parish Church of Kubed. Unsigned and undated.
