= Šime Budinić =

Venetian-Croatian priest (1535–1600)

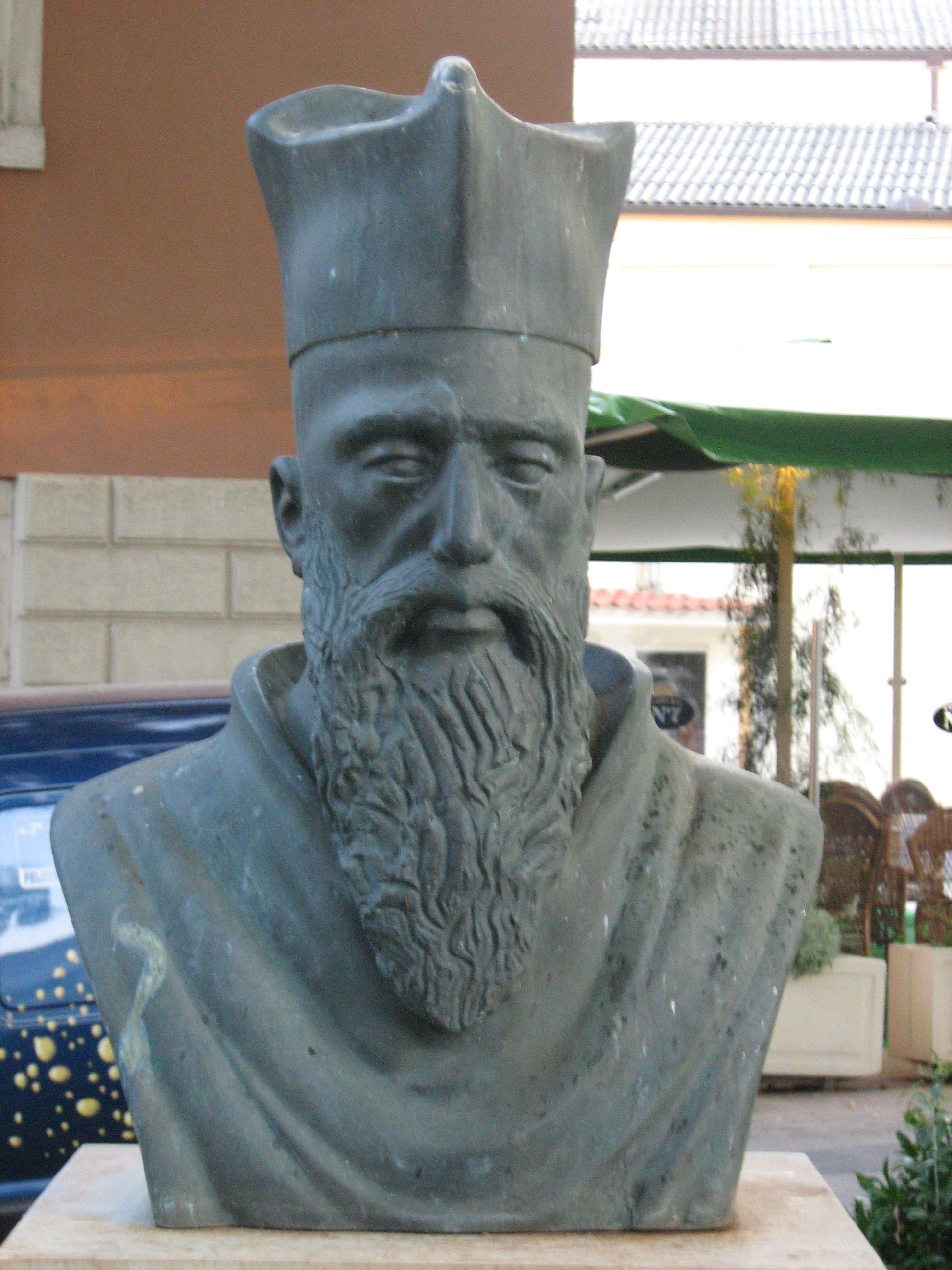
- The bust of Šime Budinić in Zadar
- Born: Petar Šimun Budinić; 1530-1535; Zara, Venetian Republic
- Died: 13 December 1600 (aged 64–65); Zara, Venetian Republic
- Other names: Piersimeone Budineo, Ssimvn Bvdineo/Ssimun Budineo, Zadranin
- Occupations: Catholic priest, writer
- Known for: being author of the version of Latin script based on comparison with Cyrillic and Glagolitic, using diacritics from Czech orthography of Jan Hus

Petar Šimun "Šime" Budinić Zadranin (Latin: Piersimeone Budineo) (1535 – 13 December 1600) was a 16th-century Venetian-Croatian Catholic priest and writer from Zadar, Venetian Dalmatia (today Croatia). He was a translator of psalms and catechetical texts, promoter of post-Tridentine Catholicism, and a poet.

== Early life ==
Budinić was born in Zadar in the period between 1530 and 1535 in a family that originated from the Zadar hinterland. His father was a goldsmith whose name was Mihovil and his mother Klara was from the De Sanctis family. He was most likely educated by the Franciscans from Zadar, and knew both the Glagolitic and Cyrillic scripts well. It is assumed that he completed elementary and humanist education in Zadar, and higher education in Padua.

Budinić became a Catholic priest in Zadar and advanced to the position of canon in 1560. Scholars disagree whether or not Budinić attended the Council of Trent. For many years Budinić was a notary in Zadar and chancellor in the Roman Catholic Archdiocese of Zadar. As chancellor he wrote official documents using the Glagolitic script. While Budinić was a notary he had a lot of spare time which he used to read love songs. He is first mentioned in documents in 1556. Between 1559 and 1561 he wrote verses of love songs in dodecasyllable, seven of them still preserved, some of them in honor of Pelegrinović's Jeđupka. At that time he also authored one short Latin satire on the subject of cheated husbands.

Budinić was a light-headed young priest who was even temporary expelled from Catholicism because of his misconduct, after he was reported for beating one of his fellow priests who swore his parents. Thanks to the influence of his family, this excommunication was abolished without endangering the advance in his career. In 1570 Budinić was appointed as chaplain of the Chapel of Saint Lucia on the island Pag and in 1577 he became a vicar general of the Archdiocese of Zadar.

== Chakavian period ==
In June 1581, Budinić travelled to Rome at the invitation of the Holy See to promote Counter-Reformation policy. According to one 1626 letter, Pope Gregory XIII invited Budinić to Rome to translate the Catechesis of Peter Canisius into Illyrian using Illyrian characters. Pope Gregory XIII ordered Budinić to prepare the Roman Catholic Catechism using Illyrian and its characters. It is unclear if Pope ordered any particular script. Although it is confirmed by many contemporary documents that the Pope indeed ordered Budinić to prepare the Roman Catholic Catechism using Illyrian and its characters it remain unclear if the Pope ordered any particular script. When Budinić arrived to Rome he became a confessor in Pontifical Croatian College of St. Jerome where he worked on the improvement of the Glagolitic missals and breviaries.

During his stay in Rome Budinić wrote his first two books on Croatian with the Chakavian dialect. According to one 1581 Vatican document, Budinić was preparing a translation into Serbian (Latin: nella lingua serviana), which at that time in the Vatican and Dubrovnik was a term used for Cyrillic script, the preferred language for Vatican documents to be published regarding Slavic language.

== Shtokavian period and orthographic reform ==
Budinić's intention was, from reasons of propaganda, to employ language and orthography that could penetrate and be understood in all of what was then the southern reaches of the Slavic people. Budinić attempted a daring orthographic reform and authored a version of the Latin script based on the Cyrillic and Glagolitic scripts, using diacritics (namely č and ž) from the Czech orthography of Jan Hus in his 1582 work. Some authors believed that Budinić, being promoter of Counter-Reformation, would never use orthography of Jan Hus who was a key predecessor to the Protestant Reformation.

Under the influence of Jesuit priest Peter Canisius, Budinić abandoned the language he had been using in his 1582 work, and instead used a mixture of Shtokavian Serbo-Croatian, Church Slavonic, Czech, and Polish. Budinić referred to the language of his work as Slavonic. Budinić then published translations of Canisius' work in 1583 (Summa nauk Kristjanski) in two versions, Cyrillic and Latin, and created a complex script based on Ijekavian Shtokavian pronunciation. The Latin script edition was published for clergy while Cyrillic script edition was published for population. Budinić published Cyrillic script edition with intention to spread this kind of book among South Slavs who were adherents of the Eastern Orthodox Church.

== Legacy ==
Budinić died in Zadar on 13 December 1600, around the age of 65. The elementary school in Zadar bears Budinić's name. A square in Zadar was named Šime Budinić´s Square (Croatian: Poljana Šime Budinića).

== Bibliography ==
Bibliography of Budinić's works include:

1. His own works:
  1. Love songs written in dodecasyllable, seven of them still preserved, including verses in honor of Pelegrinović's Jeđupka, Zadar, 1559-1561
  2. Short satire which subject were cheated husbands, Latin, Zadar, 1559-1561
2. Translations:
  1. Katekizam rimski (The Roman Catechism). Authored in Zadar before 1580, published in Rome, between 1582 and 1585 on Glagolitic script.
  2. Translation of David's pentitential and many other psalms (Pochorni i mnozii inii pslami Davidovi sloxeni v slovignschi iazich na cisto i miru po Scymunu Budineu popu Zadraninu), Rome 1582, Printing House of Fr. Zanetti, second edition published in Rijeka 1861 - It is possible that this translation was authored by someone who referred to himself as Simeone (Dalmata) who might be different person from Šime Budinić.
  3. Translation of Directions for priests confessors and for penitents (Latin: Directorium Sacerdotum) (Ispravnik za erei ispovidnici i za pokornici), Rome, 1582, 1635., Venice 1709.
  4. Translation of the Summary of the Christian doctrine (Svmma navka christianskoga, sloxena častnim včitegliem Petrom Kanisiem, tvmačena iz latinskog iazika u slovignsky i vtisstena po zapoviedi presuetoga Otca Pape Gregoria trinadestoga). Rome 1583, author Peter Canisius. Published in both Latin and Cyrillic scripts.

== See also ==
- List of Glagolitic books

== Sources ==
- Fine, John V. A. (5 February 2010). When Ethnicity Did Not Matter in the Balkans: A Study of Identity in Pre-Nationalist Croatia, Dalmatia, and Slavonia in the Medieval and Early-Modern Periods. University of Michigan Press. ISBN 0-472-02560-0.
- Štefanić, Vjekoslav (July 2002). Forum (in Croatian). Croatian Academy of Sciences and Arts.
- Kraljev, Jeronim (1956). Foretić, Dinko; Horvat, Vera; Kraljev, Jeronim; et al. (eds.). Učiteljska škola Zadar: 1866-1956. Odbor za proslavu 90-godišnjice Učiteljske škole u Zadru.
- Franičević, Marin (1986). Izabrana djela: Povijest hrvatske renesansne književnosti. Nakladni zavod Matice hrvatske.
- Ravlić, Jakša (1964). Zadar: geografia, ekonomija, saobraćaj, povijest, kultura. Zbornik. Matica Hrvatska.
- Švelec, Franjo (1989). "BUDINIĆ, Šime (Budin(a)eus, Budineo, Budinich, Budineić)". Hrvatski biografski leksikon (in Croatian). Zagreb: Miroslav Krleža Institute of Lexicography.
- Breyer, Mirko (1952). O starim i rijetkim jugoslavenskim knjigama: bibliografsko-bibliofilski prikaz. Jugoslavenska akademija znanosti i umjetnosti.
- Katičić, Radoslav (1999). Na kroatističkim raskrižjima (in Croatian). Hrvatski studiji-Studia Croatica. ISBN 9789536682065.
