= Obrad Zelić =

Serbian dentist and professor

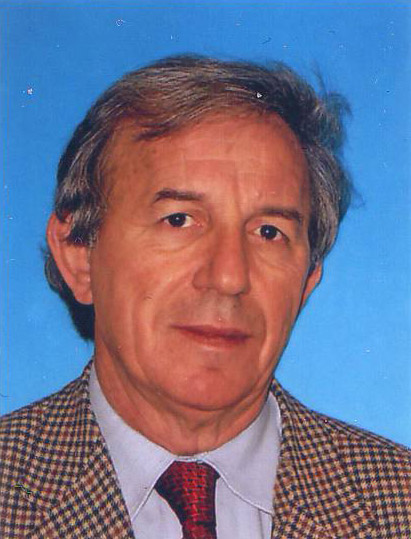
Obrad Zelić

Obrad Zelic (Serbian Cyrillic: Oбрад Зелић) is a professor of parodontology and oral medicine at the University of Belgrade's Faculty of Stomatology, and a guest professor at faculties in Moscow, Yerevan, Toronto, Winnipeg, Athens, and Jerusalem. He graduated first in the class of 1970 and became a docent before his 33rd birthday in 1979.

He was awarded The Serbian Medical Society's Lifetime Achievement Award in 2009 (Награда за животно дело).

He is President of the Association of Dentists of Serbia.

== Research ==
He was the chief researcher on 6 scientific projects. He is an associate on the Serbian Ministry of Science and Technology project titled "The Etiology, Risk Factors, and Therapy of Diseases of the Parodontium" no. 1552. He also worked on "Regenerative Treatment of Progressive Periodontitis using Different Aloplastic Materials" with colleagues from Germany, Canada and the US.

Zelic is an innovator in healing preparations. He is the maker of a patent for the anti-septic solution for healing the inflammation of the mouth cavity and gullet – Ozosept (1993) and Ozosept-Gel (1999). The Ozosept solution (patent no. P-252/1993, registration no. 48539/1998) has become part of clinical and ambulance practice in Serbia and most surrounding countries.

He headed (1989–2001) the design of and pre-clinical and clinical studies on the production of the first artificial bone made in Serbia (Aldovit-1).

== Recognition ==
He was made honorary doctor of sciences at the University of Yerevan's Medical School in 1995.
