= Michele Stratico =

Italian composer (1728–1783)

Giuseppe Michele Stratico
- Born: Giuseppe Michele Stratico; 31 July 1728; Zara, Venetian Republic
- Died: 31 January 1783 (aged 54); Sanguinetto
- Occupations: Composer; Violinist

Giuseppe Michele Stratico (31 July 1728 – 31 January 1783) was a Venetian composer and violinist of Greek descent.

== Biography ==
Stratico was born in Zara, Republic of Venice (today Zadar in Croatia). His father, the Cretan Greek Giuseppe Battista Stratico de Candia or Stratikos (ca. 1690-28 November 1770), left Crete shortly before 1718. The island of Crete was declared a province of the Ottoman Empire in 1646 after the occupation of the western part of the Ottomans during the Great Cretan War. The Venetians maintained control of the capital until 1669, when Francesco Morosini surrendered the keys of the city of Heraklion to the Ottomans. The fortresses of Souda, Gramvousa and Spinalonga, located on small islands near Crete, remained under Venetian control until 1715, when they also fell under Ottoman control. After spending a few years in Bari, Giovanni Battista found shelter in Zara in 1720 or 1721, where he married in 1725 Maria Castelli di Chio (ca. 1700 – 18 April 1796). Her brother, Ivan Antun II Castelli (1706–78), was bishop of Kotor (1744). On 5 November 1725 Giuseppe Battista confirmed his nobility from Crete at the civic municipality of the town Nin.

Four of their twelve children achieved distinction. Domenico (1732–1799), who joined the Dominican Order, was a professor of biblical exegesis and Greek literature at the Universities of Siena (1763) and Pisa (1769), and later the Bishop of Novigrad (Istria; 1776) and Hvar (Dalmatia; 1784). Simone (1733–1824) was a prominent physicist, educator, and scientist known by Carlo Goldoni and Voltaire. In 1815 he wrote the treatise Tentativo per determinare la cagione fisica della diferenza delle voci unisoni, e della varia sensazione che esse producano, in which he discusses the differences between noises and sounds, timbre, articulation, and temperament. The fourth brother, Gregorio (1736–1806), remained in Zadar occupied with legal, diplomatic, and historical work.

After receiving the rudiments of general education in his native Zadar, Giuseppe Michele continued his music studies with Giuseppe Tartini in Padua, and law at the University of Padua from 1737 to 1745. He was supported there in particular by his uncle Antonio Stratico (d.1758), literary translator of Greek into Italian, amateur musician, and dean of the Collegio Cottunio, a boarding school for Greek boys, in Padua. Sometime between 1758 and 1763 he moved to Sanguinetto, a town near Verona, where he accepted the position of a vicario (an advisor to the local governor on criminal matters). His signature appears on a number of documents relating to legal matters in Sanguinetto, dated between 18 May 1763 and 19 September 1882. The register of death at the parish church of San Giorgio Martire in Sanguinetto indicates that Stratico died of tuberculosis after four months of illness, in Sanguinetto on 31 January 1783.

== Career ==
Stratico became a violinist in the orchestra of the Basilica del Santo. In his Memorie sul violinista G. Tartini (1758), the physicist Giordano Riccati mentioned that Stratico was an outstanding violinist in the orchestra of the Basilica del Santo. His six sonatas for violin and violoncello or harpsichord, the only work published during his lifetime, came out through Peter Welcker in London, ca. 1763. This edition might have been arranged by his brother Simeone, who around that time studied shipbuilding in England. The edition is dedicated to Girolamo Lion Cavazza, the Paduan nobleman who owned large properties in Sanguinetto. The latest information on Stratico as a composer comes from a 1776 letter in which Giovenale Sacchi, a musician and theorist from Milan, asked Giordano Riccati for an evaluation of Stratico's works in order to include one of his pieces in an anthology of Psalms settings which he intended to publish.

Moving to Sanguinetto Stratico was able to focus his studies on music theory, especially deepening aspects of the axioms of mathematical and physical problems and intervals of dissonance and consonance. In his Trattato di musica, preserved in nine versions at the Biblioteca di San Marco, Venice, he discussed issues of temperament and intonation. He argued that temperament was nothing but a necessary evil, which makes instruments using it inferior to the string instruments. Stratico's other treatise, Lo spirito tartiniano, written in the form of a dialogue between Tartini's spirit and his sleeping student, discusses Tartini's Dissertatione de' principi dell'armonia contenuta nel diatonico genere. An undated letter of Stratico to Francescantonio Vallotti (Biblioteca Antoniana, Padua) affirms their discussions of music theory.

== Artistic works ==
Stratico wrote some 280 instrumental works, including more than 170 sonatas for violin and bass. His music is heavily influenced by Tartini, especially the violin concertos. An examination of his music reveals that he was a composer, devoted to instrumental virtuosity, but "softened" by the stability of rhythmic, melodic and harmonic structures characteristic of the Baroque. By combining the Classical harmonic progressions, chromatic sequences, and three- and four-bar thematic units with contrapuntal imitations, canon, and melodic sequences, Stratico stands at a turning point between the expiring Baroque and early Classicism. The opening movements of these works are often based on the contrasting thematic material which he developed in the movement's middle section, anticipating the future sonata allegro form.

== Compositions ==
The largest number of Stratico's compositions (283) is kept at the library of the University of California, Berkeley, in a collection of the 18th-century Italian instrumental music. This collection was until 1950 in the possession of the Stecchini family from Bassano del Grappa, and it was purchased for the Berkeley library in 1959. In his memoires dated 1814, Paduan violin amateur Antonio Bonaventura Sberti mentioned that he owned two boxes of music among were kept "tutte le opere del Corelli, grande numero di concerti, con suonate a solo violino e basso del Tartini, e del Sig. Michele Stratico, insigne aluno del gran Tartini, oltre duo sacchi di sinfonie, duetti, etc. di ottimi scrittori di musica", The other libraries preserving Stratico's compositions include the Deutsche Staatsbibliothek, Berlin; Biblioteca Estense, Modena; the Capella Antoniana, Padua; the Biblioteca di San Marco, Venice; the Fondazione Ugo e Olga Levi, Venice; and the Library of Congress, Washington, D.C.

- 6 sonatas for violin and cello / harpsichord, op.1 (1763, London)
- 170 sonatas for violin
- 35 symphonies
- 6 string quartets (concertina quartet)
- 50 approx. trio sonatas
- 15 duos for violin
- 61 violin concertos
- 2 concertos for two violins

== Theoretical writings ==
- Trattato di musica, manuscript at the Biblioteca di San Marco, Venice, MSS It.Cl. IV.342(=5347), It.Cl. IV.343 (=5348), It.Cl. IV.341 (=5346).
- Lo spirito Tartiniano, che dialogizza, e disputa con uno suo dormiente discepolo, sopra le materia più importanti contenute nella disertazione de' principi del'armonia contenuta nel diatonico genere, stampata nel seminario di Padova nel 1767, manuscript at the Biblioteca di San Marco, Venice, MSS It.Cl. IV.343(=5348).
