= Enrico Tivaroni =

Dalmatian Italian politician (1841–1925)

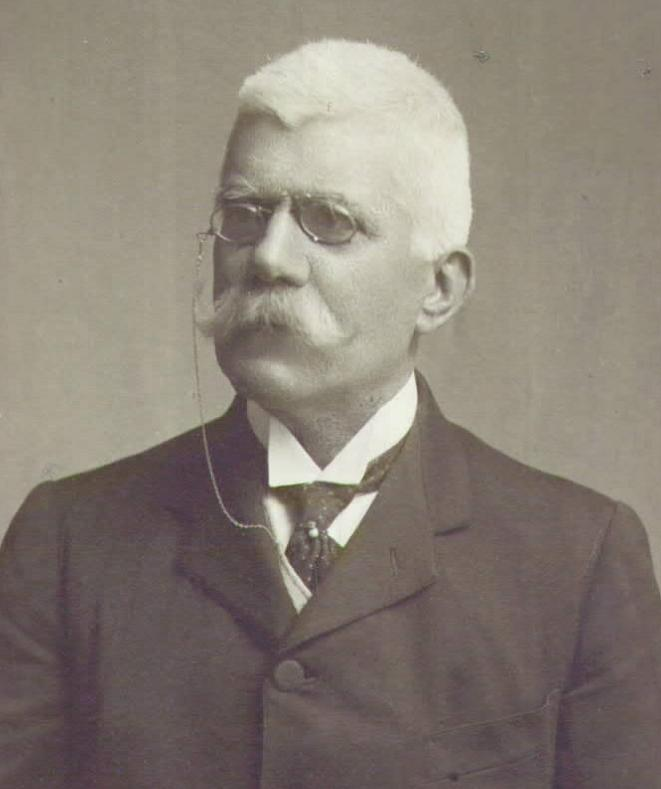

Senator of the Kingdom of Italy
- In office 19 December 1923 – 13 August 1925

Personal details
- Born: 13 May 1841 Zara, Austria-Hungary
- Died: 13 August 1925 (aged 84) Padua, Italy
- Spouse: Unmarried
- Awards: Knight of the Order of the Crown; Officer of the Order of the Crown; Commander of the Order of the Crown; Grand Officer of the Order of the Crown; Knight of the Order of Saints Maurice and Lazarus; Officer of the Order of Saints Maurice and Lazarus; Commander of the Order of Saints Maurice and Lazarus; Grand Officer of the Order of Saints Maurice and Lazarus

Enrico Tivaroni (13 May 1841 – 13 August 1925) was a Dalmatian Italian magistrate and politician. Tivaroni was an Italian senator from 19 December 1923 until his death, on 13 August 1925.
