= Corsicans =

Ethnic group native to Corsica

Corsi (Corsican) Corsi (Italian) Corses (French)

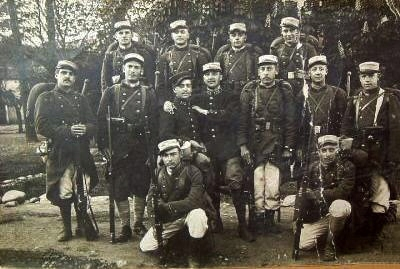
- Corsicans military personnel of French armed forces, 1917.

Total population
- 2,500,000–3,500,000

Regions with significant populations
- Corsica: ~ 322,120 (inhabitants of Corsica, regardless of ethnicity); 181,354 (people born in Corsica)
- France: 1,000,000 ~ 1,200,000
- Puerto Rico: 300,000 ~ 400,000
- Sardinia: 200,000 ~ 300,000
- Italy: 6200
- United States: 1840

Languages
- Native; Corsican; Primarily: Italian; French

Religion
- Christianity (Predominantly Roman Catholicism, Byzantine Greek-Catholic and Orthodox minority)

Related ethnic groups
- Sardinians; Corsi people; Italians Occitans; Spaniards; Catalans; Albanians; Greeks

The Corsicans (Corsican, Italian: Corsi; French: Corses) are a Romance ethnic group native to the Mediterranean island of Corsica, a territorial collectivity of France.

== Origin and history ==
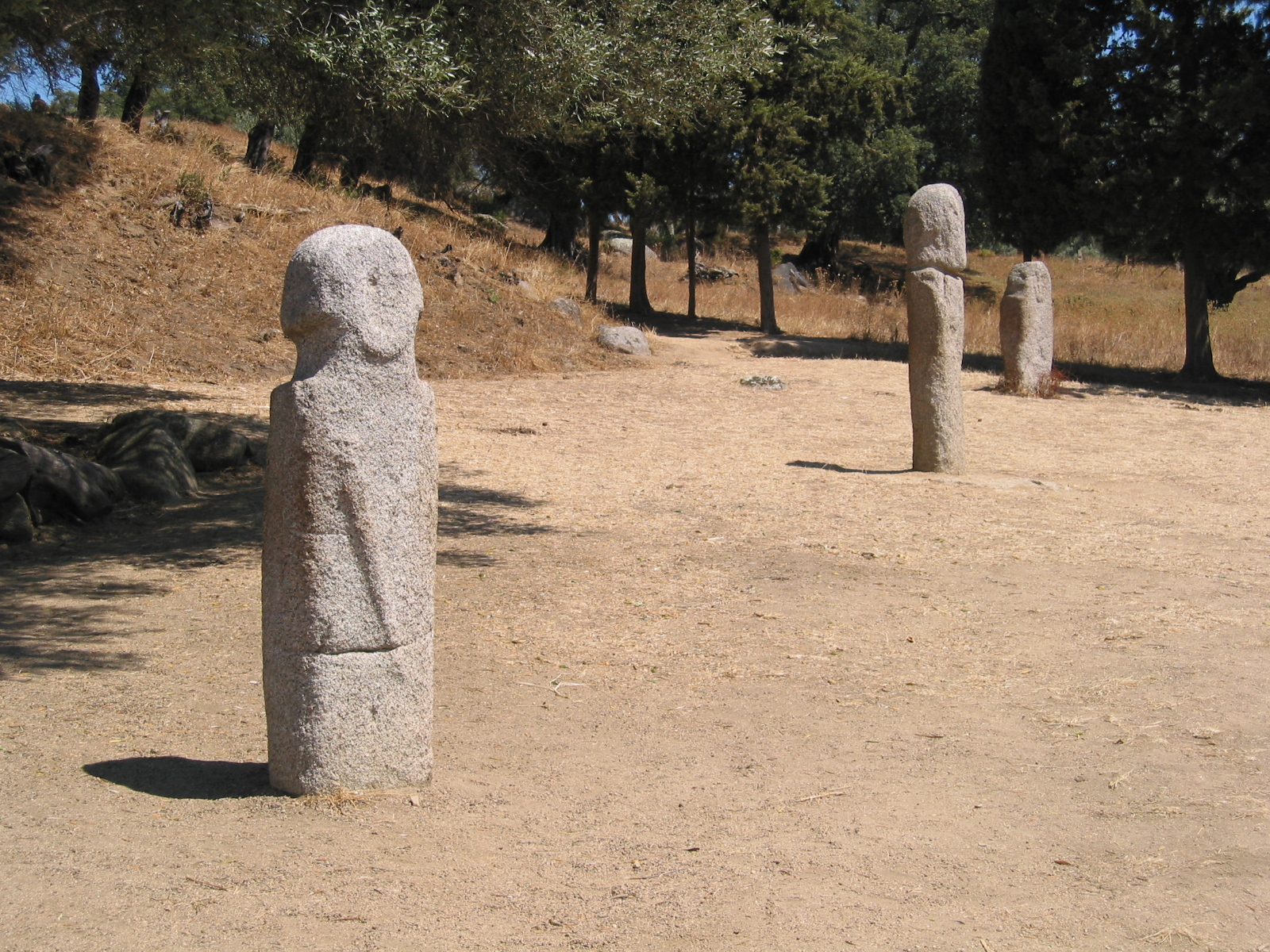
Filitosa, Statue menhir

The island was populated since the Mesolithic (Dame de Bonifacio) and the Neolithic by people who came from the Italian Peninsula, especially the modern regions of Tuscany and Liguria. An important megalithic tradition developed locally since the 4th millennium BC. Reached, like Sardinia, by Polada culture influences in the Early Bronze Age, in the 2nd millennium BC Corsica, the southern part in particular, saw the rise of the Torrean civilization, strongly linked to the Nuragic civilization.

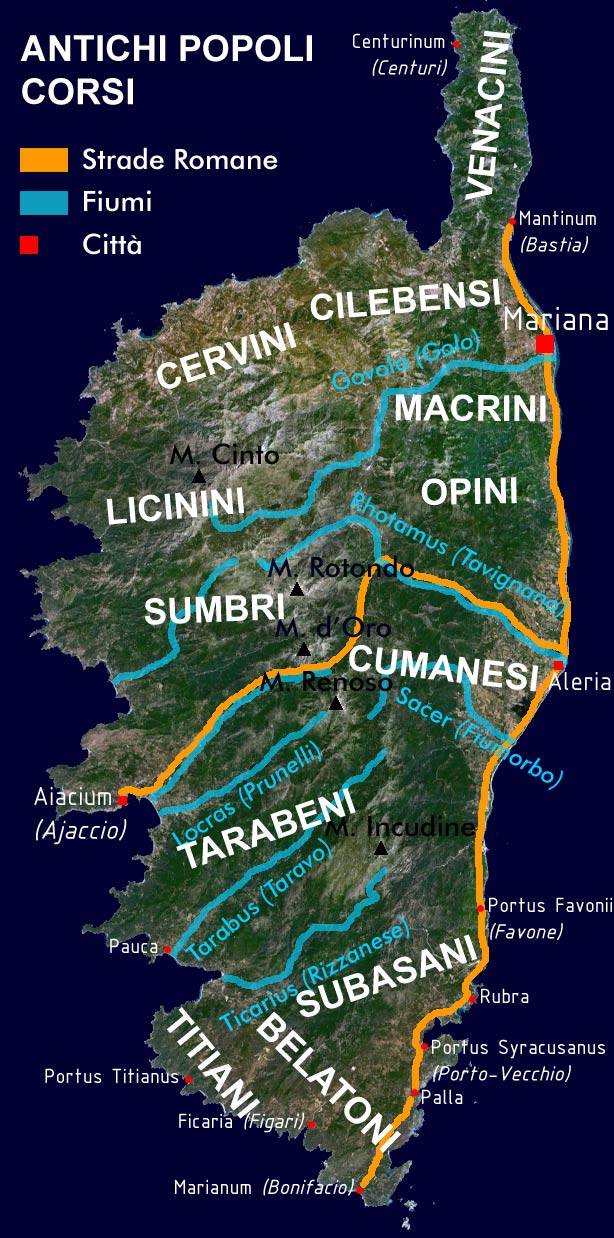
Ancient tribes of Corsica

The modern Corsicans are named after an ancient people known by the Romans as Corsi. The Corsi, who gave their name to the island, also inhatibed the Northeastern part of Nuragic Sardinia (Gallura). According to Ptolemy, the Corsi were made up of a large number of tribes that dwelt in Corsica (namely the Belatones or Belatoni, the Cervini, the Cilebenses or Cilibensi, the Cumanenses or Cumanesi, the Licinini, the Macrini, the Opini, the Subasani, the Sumbri, the Tarabeni, the Titiani and the Venacini) as well as in the far north-east of Sardinia (the Lestricones, Lestrigones or Lestriconi / Lestrigoni, the Longonenses or Longonensi). These Corsi shared the island with the Tibulati, who dwelt at the extreme north of Sardinia near the ancient town of Tibula.

According to several scholars, they may have been a group of tribes affiliated to the ancient Ligures, like the Ilvates in the neighboring Ilva island (today's Elba in Italy), and may have spoken the old Ligurian language. Seneca claimed that the Corsi were of mixed origin, resulting from the continuous mingling of various ethnic groups of foreign origin, like the Ligures, the Greeks and the Iberians. In the aftermath of the battle of Alalia, Corsica was occupied by the Etruscans. At the beginning of our era, Corsica underwent Romanization. In the Middle Ages, the local population of Corsica mixed with a minority of Byzantines, Germanic Ostrogoths, Franks and Lombards. In the 9th century, the established Holy Roman Empire continually warred with the Saracens for control of the island. In 807, Charlemagne's constable Burchard defeated an invading force from Al Andalus. In the 11th and 18th centuries the Pisans and the Genoese dominated the island. The indigenous population preferred to live in the central part of the island, which contributed to relative security and prevented them from mingling with foreigners.

Strabo says that when the Roman captains did some errands in Corsica and took a large number of slaves to Rome, one looked with admiration at the fact that the Corsicans were all savages and were more beast than man: for either they hunted each other to death in every way possible to them, or else they annoyed their masters so greatly with their impatience and lack of wit, that the said masters were angry for having put their money into it, although they would have cost them very little.

For several centuries the Corsicans suffered raids from the Barbary and many captured Corsicans were enslaved in North Africa. Some of these slaves converted to Islam and became renegades in the service of the Ottoman Empire, they in turn captured other Corsicans. Among these renegades are Hasan Corso, Mami Corso and Murad I Bey (born Giacomo Senti) who founded the Muradid dynasty, of Corsican origin and who reigned over the Regency of Tunis from 1613 to 1702.

At the end of the Middle Ages and at the beginning of the Renaissance, the Corsicans distinguished themselves in combat in many conflicts, many of them were then mercenaries (or Condottieri) and fought for sometimes rival Kingdoms. Corsicans distinguished themselves in particular during the Battle of Lepanto alongside the Holy League against the Ottoman Empire, others were mercenaries in the service of the Kingdom of France (including Sampiero Corso who also served the Kingdom of Naples and returned to his native land with the support of France, Naples, and the Ottoman Empire to confront the Genoese occupiers).

At the beginning of the 17th century, according to Pierre Davity, the Corsicans were, to him, less civilized and polite than neighboring Italians. They were called "extremely cruel," similar to what Caesar said of them. Both Caesar and Davity agreed that there are some very good soldiers and brave strong men among them. Moreover, the Italians believed them vengeful, resulting in a common proverb which says that one should not trust a Corsican, neither alive nor dead, because as soon as someone has been killed, suddenly all his relatives come together to kill the murderer if it is possible for them.

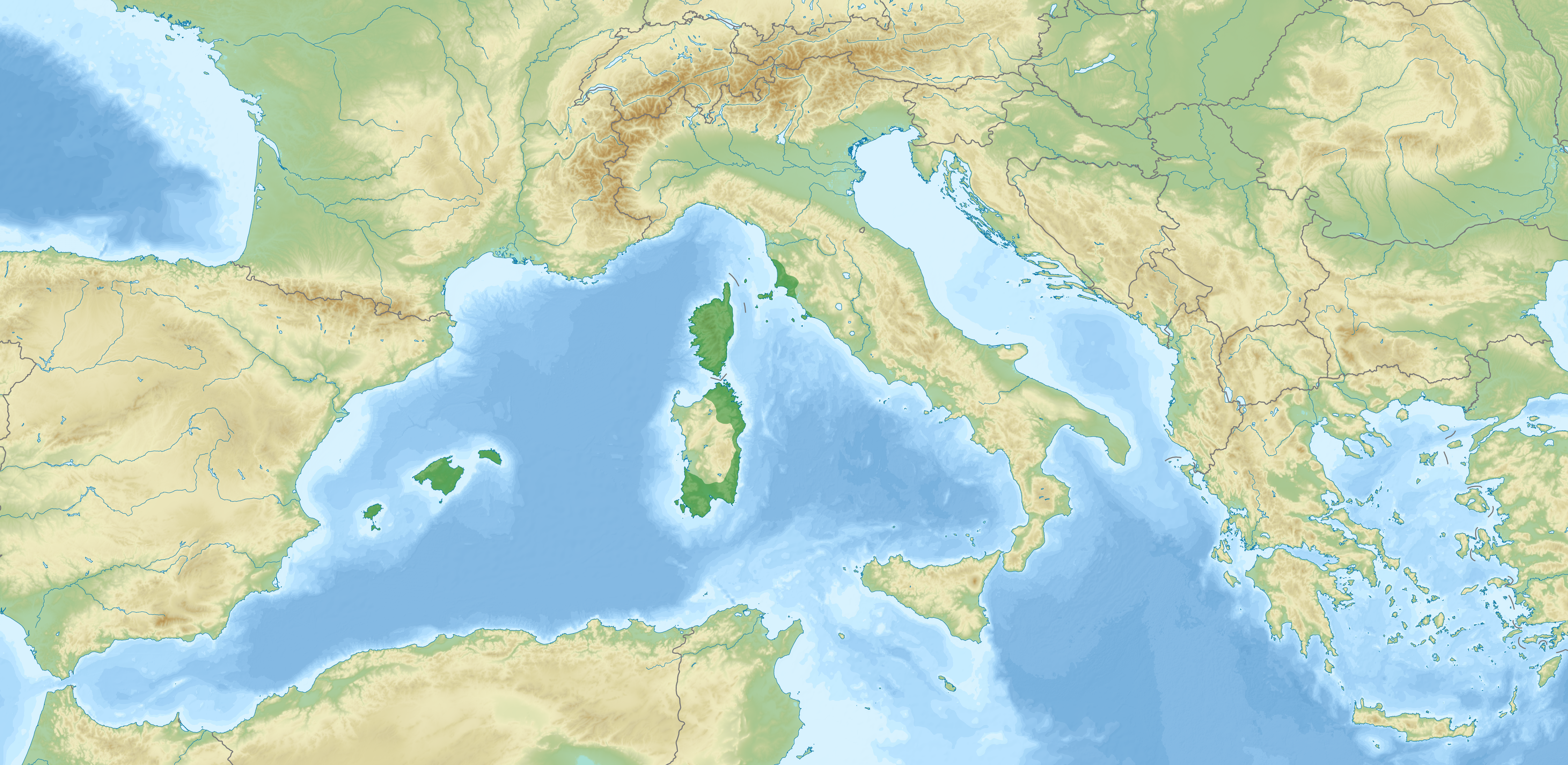
The territorial expansion of the Republic of Pisa

In subsequent centuries, Corsica was ruled and settled by Pisans (from 1050 to 1295) and the Genoese (from 1295 to 1755, when the island broke free from La Superba): this is reflected in the fact that around 80% of the modern Corsican surnames (Casanova, Luciani, Agostini, Colonna, Paoli, Bartoli, Rossi, Albertini, Filippi, Cesari, etc.) is found in Italy, as well as in the fact that the modern Corsican varieties, especially the Northern ones, are linguistically considered part of Tuscan.

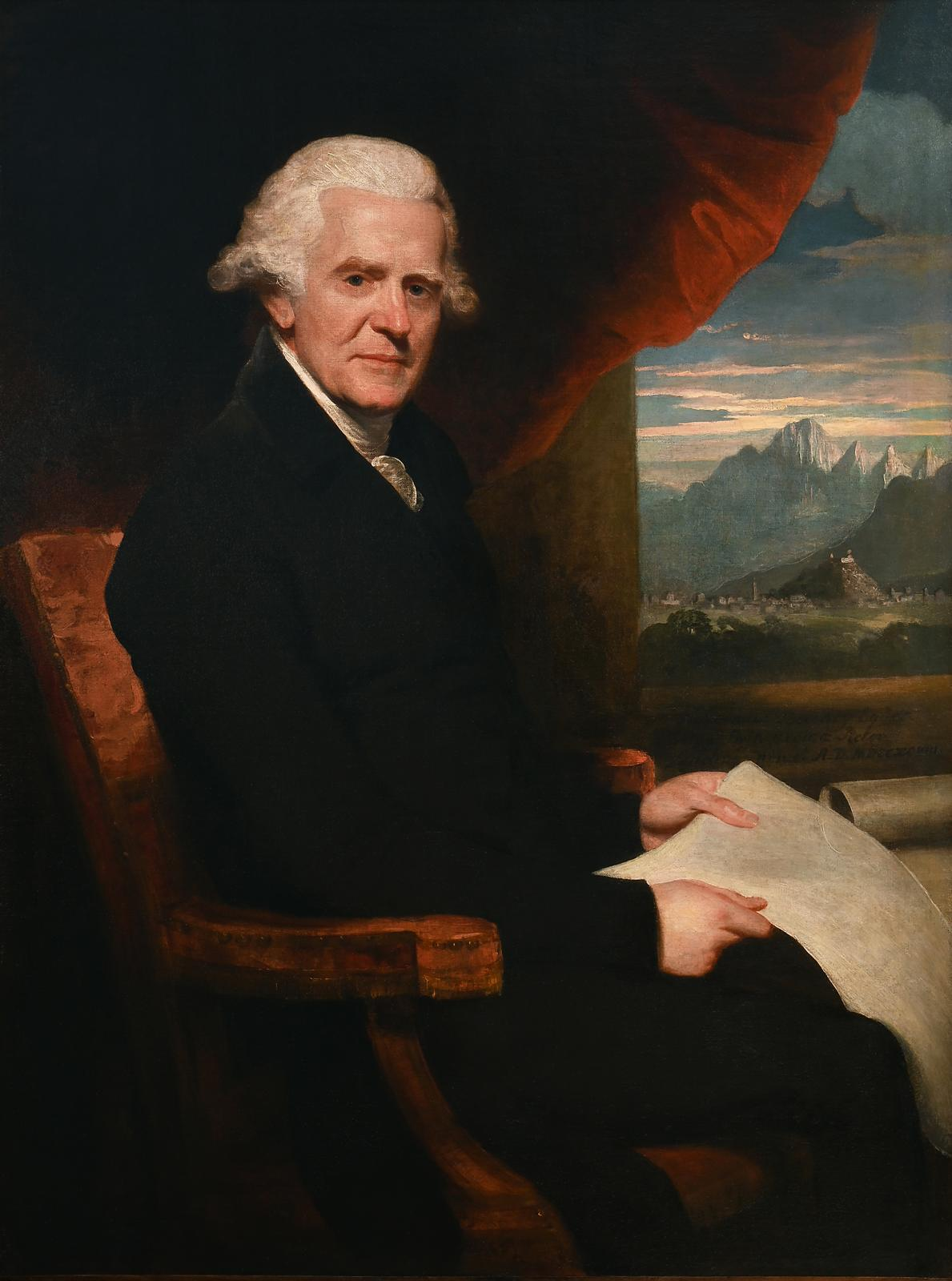
Pascal Paoli was a Corsican military leader and statesman.

Because the island has been historically and culturally related to the Italian mainland up until then, the Italian populations from Northern and Central Italy have contributed to a significant degree to the modern Corsican ancestry.

In 1891 Roland Bonaparte wrote in Une excursion en Corse that the Corsicans particularly abhor injustice and since the Genoese who ruled the island for 500 years had erected the denial of justice into a principle of government, it followed that the Corsica was reduced to taking justice into his own hands: hence the vendetta.

Throughout the 19th century many Corsicans sympathized with the Bonapartist doctrine and French nationalism while other Corsicans took part in French political and military life.

== Demographics ==
Population: 2011 census
Birthplace of Corsica residents	Percent of population
Corsica	56.3%
Continental France	28.6%
Overseas France	0.3%
Born in foreign countries with French citizenship at birth¹	5.0%
Immigrants²	9.8%
Reference: ¹Essentially Pieds-Noirs who resettled in Corsica. ²An immigrant is by French definition a person born in a foreign country and who didn't have French citizenship at birth.

Corsica has a population of 322,120 inhabitants (Jan. 2013 estimate). At the 2011 census, 56.3% of the inhabitants of Corsica were born on the island and 28.6% in Continental France, while 0.3% were natives of Overseas France and 14.8% hailed from foreign (non-French) countries.

The majority of the foreign population in Corsica comes from the Maghreb (particularly Algerians, who made up 33.5% of all immigrants in Corsica at the 2011 census), and from Southern Europe (particularly Portuguese, 22.7% of all immigrants, followed by the Italians, 13.7%).

=== Corsican diaspora ===
During the 19th century and the first part of the 20th century, Corsican emigration was significant. Large numbers of Corsicans left the island for the French mainland or foreign countries. During the 19th century, the favorite destinations of migrants were the French colonies and South America (for more details, see Corsican immigration to Puerto Rico and Corsican immigration to Venezuela).

Then, between the 1880s and the 1950s, the major destination became the French mainland, primarily Marseille, which today is sometimes called the "first Corsican city of the world" with around 100,000 to 600,000 Corsicans in the city. Causes of this emigration are various; poverty is the main reason (the French laws for restriction of exportations, the Second Industrial Revolution and an agricultural crisis and near-famine had an adverse effect on the local economy). Later, the departures became more considerable owing to the demographic strain caused by First World War. Provence is home to one of the largest Corsican diaspora communities.

=== Census data ===
Place of birth of residents of Corsica (1982 - 2011)
Census	Born in Corsica	Born in Continental France	Born in Overseas France	Born in foreign countries with French citizenship at birth	Immigrants^{2}		
2011	56.3%	28.6%	0.3%	5.0%	9.8%		
2011	56.3%	28.6%	0.3%	5.0%	from the Maghreb^{3}	from Southern Europe^{4}	from the rest of the world
2011	56.3%	28.6%	0.3%	5.0%	4.3%	3.8%	1.7%
1999	59.5%	24.8%	0.3%	5.5%	10.0%		
1999	59.5%	24.8%	0.3%	5.5%	from the Maghreb^{3}	from Southern Europe^{4}	from the rest of the world
1999	59.5%	24.8%	0.3%	5.5%	5.3%	3.3%	1.4%
1990	62.0%	21.3%	0.2%	6.0%	10.5%		
1982	61.6%	20.4%	0.2%	6.0%	11.8%		

Notes: Essentially Pieds-Noirs who resettled in Corsica after the independence of Tunisia, Morocco and Algeria, many of whom had Corsican ancestry.^{2} An immigrant is by French definition a person born in a foreign country and who didn't have French citizenship at birth. Note that an immigrant may have acquired French citizenship since moving to France, but is still listed as an immigrant in French statistics. On the other hand, persons born in France with foreign citizenship (the children of immigrants) are not listed as immigrants. ^{3} Morocco, Tunisia, Algeria ^{4} Portugal, Italy, Spain, Andorra, Gibraltar, Monaco Source: INSEE

== Culture and tradition ==
=== Militarized society ===
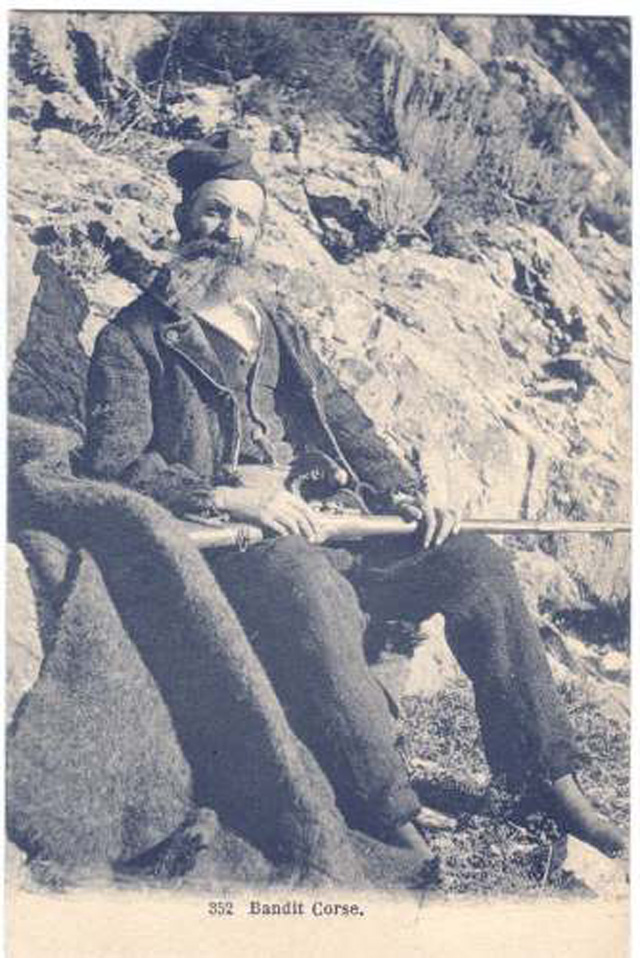
A Corsican bandit in 19th–20th century

Corsican society is a militarized society, during the Middle Ages, many Corsican men had been part of Condottiere troops in the service of various kingdoms and empires in Europe. This was probably due to the fact that Corsica, deprived of wealth resources, could only enrich itself at the time through its inhabitants waging war. In the history of France, since the Conquest of Corsica, the Corsicans were the national ethnic group most involved in armed forces in proportion to their population. After the French Conquest of Corsica, many Corsicans refusing the French yoke took up arms, harassing the new authorities. A large number of generals in the French army during the First French Empire were also Corsicans.

At the beginning of the 21st century, Corsica holds the record number per capita of people with authorized gun ownership. With 341 declared weapons per 1,000 inhabitants, the island is at the top of the French regions with a level of weaponry comparable to Texas.

=== Vendetta ===
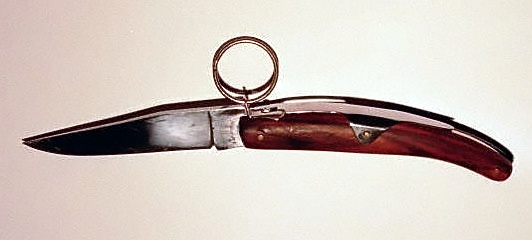
A vendetta knife

The vendetta is one of the key points of Corsican society. The Corsicans have for a very long time, due to the absence of state and cult of honor, preferred to use the Vendetta in cases of dishonor of oneself or towards a member of one's family, or to avenge a murder committed by a reckless one.

Among Corsicans, the permanent invocation of honour for the most serious and the most trivial things is an attitude which allows one to settle scores.

In some cases, the vendetta can be settled by a mediator, thus allowing the vengeance to end, or end with the death of the guilty person.

=== Religion ===
The Corsicans are in the extreme majority Roman Catholics, although with their own pre-Christian contributions. Catholicism, beyond religion, is at the very source of Corsican culture, it is traditional music, symphonies or songs, Catholicism and liturgical songs have directly impacted the way of singing traditional music.

Previously, some Corsicans were Muslims, followers of Sunni Islam, but this did not concern the majority, Corsican Muslims were established in North Africa and were often freed slaves.

=== Beliefs and superstitions ===
The Corsicans had within their culture their own supernatural myths and legends. Historically superstitious, the Corsican population had its own beliefs passed down from generation to generation.

« L'ochju » is the Corsican version of Evil Eye. To remove «l'ochju» you need a «signatore» (a kind of faith healer) who exorcise the affected person by dint of prayers and rituals.

The "Mazzeru" is a kind of sorcerer who predicts the death of human beings in his dreams. He hunts and kills the first wild beast he finds, turns it over and sees on its face the face of a loved one who will soon die. After this period, their lifespan cannot exceed one year and 3 days. The "Mazzeru" would be someone strange and mysterious but not necessarily evil, since he kills against his will during his dreams.

=== First names ===
Native Corsican first names differ very widely from French and Italian first names, so that a bearer of a native first name is easily recognizable. Here are some examples:

- Anghjulu is the Corsican form of Ange/Angelo
- Chjara is the Corsican form of Claire/Chiara
- Ghjaseppu is the Corsican form of Joseph/Giuseppe
- Guglielmu is the Corsican form of Guillaume/Guglielmo/William
- Petru is the Corsican form of Pietro/Pierre
- Lavighju/Lavisu are the Corsican forms of Luigi/Louis
- Santu is the Corsican form of Toussaint

Due to the possibility for certain people who do not speak Corsican to mispronounce these first names, some are not used in civil registration but can be used as pseudonyms by people with the equivalent of these first names to assert their identity.

=== Languages ===
Alongside French (Français), the official language throughout France, Corsican (Corsu) is the other most widely spoken language on the island: it is a Romance language pertaining to the Italo-Dalmatian branch and akin to medieval Tuscan. Corsican was long the Vernacular language besides Italian (Italiano), which retained official status in Corsica until 1859. Since then, Italian as the island's traditional prestige language has been replaced by French due to the annexation of the island by France in 1768. Over the next two centuries, the use of French grew to the extent that, by the Liberation in 1945, all islanders had a working knowledge of French. The twentieth century saw a wholesale language shift, with islanders changing their language practices to the extent that there were no monolingual Corsican speakers left by the 1960s. By 1990, an estimated 50% of islanders had some degree of proficiency in Corsican, and a small minority, perhaps 10%, used Corsican as a first language. Fewer and fewer people speak also a Ligurian dialect in what has long been a language island, Bonifacio: it is locally known by the name of bunifazzin.

Gallurese dialect is a variety of Corsican spoken in the extreme north of Sardinia, including the region of Gallura and the archipelago of La Maddalena. In the Maddalena archipelago, the local dialect (called Isulanu, Maddaleninu, Maddalenino) was brought by shepherds from Alta Rocca and Sartène in southern Corsica during immigration in the 17th to 18th centuries. Though influenced by Gallurese, it has maintained the original characteristics of Corsican. There are also numerous words of Genoese and Ponzese origin.

==== Number of Corsican speakers ====
The January 2007 estimated population of the island was 281,000, while the figure for the March 1999 census, when most of the studies – though not the linguistic survey work referenced in this article – were performed, was about 261,000 (see under Corsica). Only a fraction of the population at either time spoke Corsican with any fluency. The 2001 population of 341,000 speakers on the island given by Ethnologue exceeds either census and thus may be considered questionable, like its estimate of 402,000 speakers worldwide.

The use of Corsican over French has been declining. In 1980 about 70% of the population "had some command of the Corsican language." In 1990 out of a total population of about 254,000 the percentage had declined to 50%, with only 10% using it as a first language. The language appeared to be in serious decline when the French government reversed its non-supportive stand and began some strong measures to save it. Whether these measures will succeed remains to be seen. No recent statistics on Corsican are available.

UNESCO classifies the Corsican language as a potentially endangered language, as it has "a large number of children speakers" but is "without an official or prestigious status." The classification does not state that the language is currently endangered, only that it is potentially so. Often acting according to the current long-standing sentiment unknown Corsicans cross out French roadway signs and paint in the Corsican names. The Corsican language is a key vehicle for Corsican culture, which is notably rich in proverbs and in polyphonic song.

=== Cuisine ===
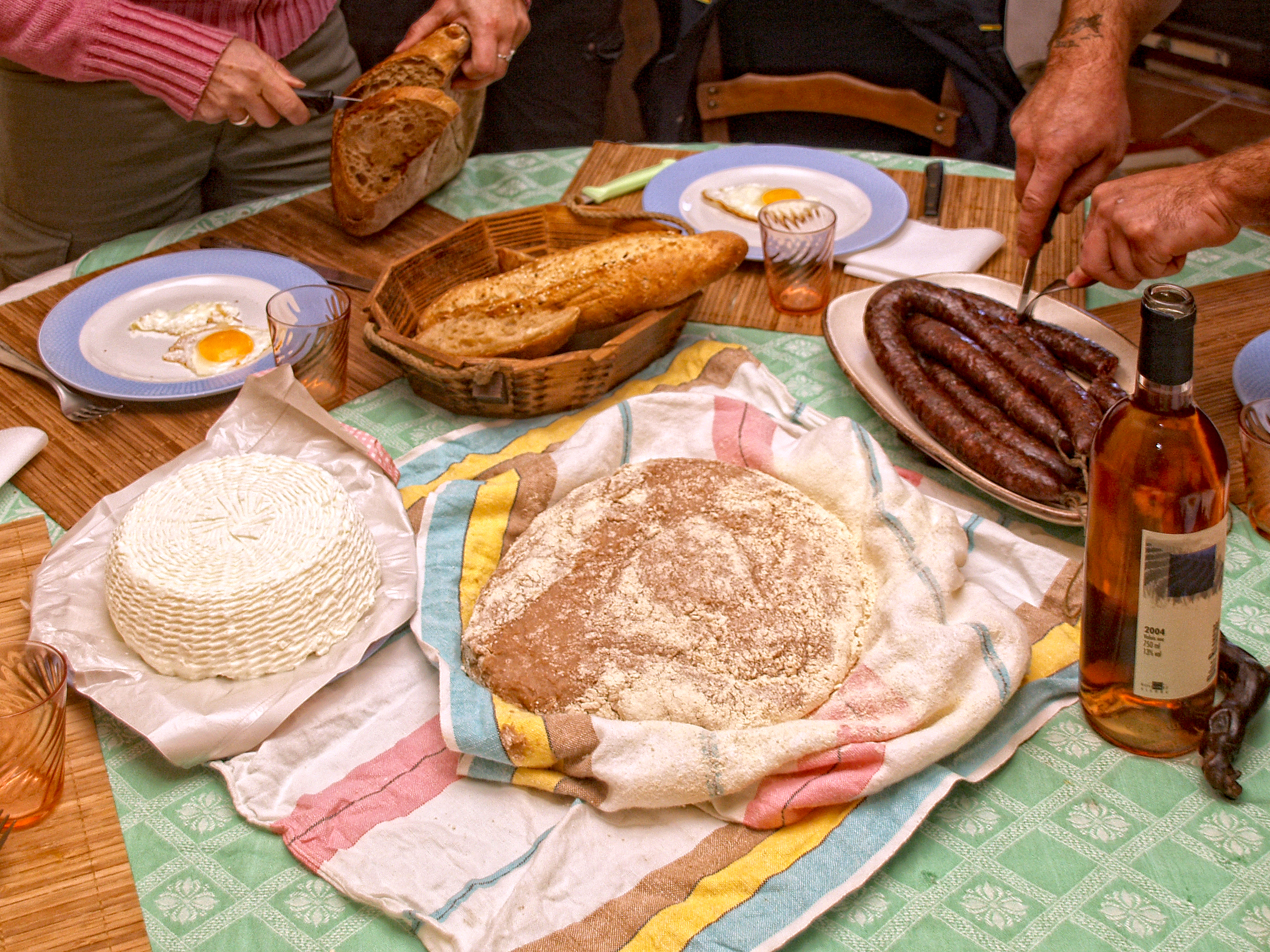
Corsican cuisine.

From the mountains to the plains and sea, many ingredients play a role. Game such as wild boar (Cignale, Singhjari) is popular, and in old times mouflon (muvra) were consumed. There also is seafood and river fish such as trout. Delicatessen such as figatellu, coppa, ham (prizuttu), lonzu are made from Corsican pork (porcu nustrale). Cheeses like Brocciu, casgiu merzu (the Corsican version of the Sardinian casu marzu), casgiu veghju are made from goat or sheep milk. Chestnuts are the main ingredient in the making of pulenta. A variety of alcoholic drinks also exist, ranging from aquavita (brandy), red and white Corsican wines (Vinu Corsu), muscat (plain or sparkling), and the famous "cap corse" produced by Mattei.

== Discrimination ==
Due to the culture of Vendetta, the presence of mafiosi of Corsican origin in 1920s-1990s, the hostility to the migration of non-Corsicans in Corsica and the multiple attacks in Corsica by local activists, the Corsicans have often been portrayed as a dangerous, intimidating, racist and criminal population by many individuals but also by states, notably the Republic of Genoa or the Kingdom of France.

For example, in 1890, the trip of President Sadi Carnot to Corsica was recounted in Le Petit Journal, with a circulation of more than a million copies, in an article entitled: «The President among the savages.»

The anarchist writer Georges Darien did not hesitate to write that the Corsicans were "a filthy race."

Some stereotypes of Corsicans include that they don't like tourists, that they are racist or lazy, or that they are terrorists or members of mafia groups.

== Genetics ==
Genetic research has revealed that the Corsican samples presented affinities with people from the French region of Provence and the Italians from Tuscany, Liguria, Campania, Sicily and Latium. Several studies on Y-chromosome haplogroup frequencies support close genetic affinities between Northwestern Corsicans and continental Europeans, while Eastern and Southern Corsicans share genetic similarities with Western Mediterranean populations.

In 2019, analysis of the genome of the Corsican population also reveals a close genetic affinity with the populations of northern and central Italy, while sharing with the Sardinians a notable proportion of ancestry, demographic processes and similar isolations. The analysis revealed that the Corsican population shares several genomic characteristics with Sardinia and north-central Italy, creating a unique blend of genomic ancestry. Overall, the Corsican samples have been found to be genetically closer to the Northern and Central Italian populations than to the neighboring Sardinians. The same study estimate that the genome of the modern Corsicans derive from Anatolia Neolithic: 33%, Europe Middle Neolithic/Chalcolithic: 34%, Steppe EMBA: 19% and Iran Neolithic: 14%.

== Notable Corsicans ==
=== National leaders ===
- Napoleon Bonaparte Aka Napoleon I (1769–1821) – Emperor of the French.
- Louis Napoléon Bonaparte aka Napoleon III (1808–1873) – President of France and Emperor of the French.
- Pasquale Paoli (1721–1807) – Father of the Corsican Republic, statesman, and military leader.
- Raúl Leoni (1905–1972) – president of Venezuela from 1964 until 1969.
- Hasan Corso born Petru Paulu Tavera' (1518–1556) – Ottoman army general, mayor of Algiers, Agha and governor of Regency of Algiers.
- Murad I Bey born Giacomo Santi aka Murād Qūrçū/Murad Corso (died 1631) – First Muradid Bey of Tunis, founder of the Muradid dynasty.
- Hammuda Pasha Bey (died 1666) – Second Muradid Bey of Tunis.

=== Military personnel ===
- Jacques Pierre Abbatucci (1723–1813) – officer in the army of Genoese Corsica, Ancien regime France and the French First Republic.
- Sampiero Corso born Sampieru de Bastelica (1498–1567) – Corsican condottiero and warlord rebel against Genoese occupation of Corsica and proto-nationalist leader.
- Pasquino Corso (died 1532) –Corsican condottiero and warlord, colonel of the papal Corsican Guard.
- Demetrio Stefanopoli (1749–1821) – Greek-Corsican military officer of Army of Condé.
- Jacques Ortoli (1895–1947) – French air force officer
- Petru Giovacchini (1910–1955) – Corsican fascist and Italian armed forces officer.
- Paul François Grossetti (1861–1918) – French Army general of World War I.
- Albert Preziosi (1915–1943) – French military aviator of Fighter Squadron 2/30 Normandie-Niemen
- Laurent Preziosi (1912–2010) – Free France resistant.
- Mami Corso aka Mami Pacha born Fillipu d'Arbarella (16th century-unknown) – Corsican Muslim privateer and lieutenant of Kılıç Ali Paşa.
- Simon Petru Cristofini (1903–1944) – Corsican nationalist and Nazi collaborator, Légion impériale commander.

=== Political activism ===
- Mariana Bracetti - Puerto Rican independentist of Corsican ancestry
- Aristides Calvani (1918–1986) - Venezuelan politician and lawyer of Corsican ancestry
- César Campinchi (1882–1941)- politician and lawyer
- Arthur Andrew Cipriani (1875–1945)- labour leader and politician of Trinidad and Tobago
- Yvan Colonna (1960–2022) – Corsican nationalist convicted for the 1998 assassination of the prefect of Corse-du-Sud, Claude Érignac.
- Alain Orsoni (1954–2026) – former leader of National Liberation Front of Corsica.
- Léo Battesti (1953-) – Founder and former leader of National Liberation Front of Corsica.
- François Santoni (1960–2001), former leader of the FLNC-Canal Historique. Left in 1998 to form Armata Corsa, and assassinated in 2001.
- Yvan Benedetti (1965-) – French nationalist activist.
- Carlos Francisco Grisanti Franceschi– Venezuelan diplomat
- Pietro Rocca (1887–1966) – publicist, journalist, nationalist and pro-fascist activist
- Santu Casanova (1850–1936) – publicist, poet, nationalist and regionalist activist, known for having made Corsican a written language.
- Danielle Casanova (1909–1943) – communist activist and anti-fascist resistance fighter.
- Marco Angeli di Sartèna (1905–1985) – nationalist and pro-Italian irredentist publicist.
- Michel Zévaco (1860–1918) – anarchist activist.

=== Bandits ===
- Antoine Bonelli aka Bellacoscia (1827–1907) – Corsican honor bandit
- Paul Carbone (1894–1943) –criminal involved in the Corsican-Marseille milieu and Nazi collaborator from 1920 until his death in 1943.
- Theodore Poli (1799–1831) – most famous Corsican bandits of the 19th century and founder of "Republic of the Bandits of Liamone".
- Nonce Romanetti (1882–1926) – one of the last Corsican bandits.

=== Singers ===
- Alizée (1984-) – French pop singer and dancer.
- Clara Luciani (1992-) – French pop singer
- Jenifer (1982) – Pop rock and Soul singer.
- Patrick Fiori (1969-) – Pop rock singer.
- Jul born Julien Mari (1990-) – French rapper

=== Journalists ===
- Tony Comiti (1950-) – French journalist of Corsican descent

== Corsicans in culture ==
=== Non-fiction literature ===
- Justification of the Corsican Revolution, (1758), written in standard Italian (Corsican was not a written language at the time but is intercomprehensible with Italian) by Gregoriu Salvini, is a work recording the injustices committed by the Republic of Genoa against the Corsicans, at the time of the Corsican War of Independence.
- An Account of Corsica (1768) by James Boswell : a document on the Corsican Republic, the Corsicans, with collections by Pasquale Paoli of whom Boswell was a contemporary.
- Jean-Jacques Rousseau's Constitutional Project for Corsica : A draft constitution by Rousseau intended for the Corsican Republic which did not come to fruition following the French Conquest of Corsica in 1769.
- Vendetta - The Heirs of the Sea Breeze (2020) written by journalists Violette Lazard and Marion Galland, the book deals with the Sea Breeze Gang.

=== Fiction literature ===
- The Corsican Brothers by Alexandre Dumas.
- Mateo Falcone by Prosper Mérimée.
- Asterix in Corsica by René Goscinny and Albert Uderzo, 1973
- Colomba by Prosper Mérimée

=== Cartoons ===
- Mireille Bouquet, the daughter of a mafia family in the 2001 anime series Noir

== See also ==
- Italians in France
- List of Corsican people
- History of Corsica
- Etruscan civilization
- List of Nuragic tribes
- Republic of Pisa
- Republic of Genoa
- Corsican language
- Sassarese
- Gallurese
- Sardinian people
- Italian people
- French people
- Corsican immigration to Puerto Rico
- Corsican immigration to Venezuela
- Italian irredentism in Corsica
- Anti-Corsican sentiment

== Bibliography ==
- Zucca, Raimondo (1996). La Corsica romana. Oristano: S'Alvure. ISBN 978-88-7383-126-6.
- Ugas, Giovanni (1 January 2006). L'alba dei nuraghi. Cagliari: Fabula Editore. ISBN 978-88-89661-00-0.
- Smith, William (1872). Dictionary of Greek and Roman Geography. London: J. Murray. pp. pages 689–692. Downloadable Google Books.
