= Corsican diaspora in Provence =

The Corsican diaspora in Provence is a major diaspora community in the Provence region of southern France.

Corsicans, facing extreme poverty and lack of proper education and job opportunities, began emigrating in large amounts from Corsica to mainland France in the mid-to-late 19th century. Due mostly to geographic proximity, Provence, particularly Marseille, became a major destination for Corsicans wishing to move to the mainland. This mass emigration continues to this day, but peaked between 1920 and 1950.

An exact number for Corsicans in Provence is difficult, as French census data does not collect ethnicity. The Marseille area alone has an estimated population of around 600,000. Corsicans in mainland France have an estimated population of one million to three million.

== In Marseille ==
Marseille is sometimes called "the first Corsican city" or "the capital of Corsica" due to the large abundance of Corsicans living in and around the city. Corsican merchants from Cap Corse and Balagne, the two northernmost regions of the island, began opening shops selling goods from their home villages as early as the mid-1800s. Following mass Corsican emigration, these small mercantile communities would grow to host large amounts of Corsicans moving into the city.

From 1880 onwards, Corsicans, seeking better opportunities and an escape from poverty, began emigrating en masse to France, particularly Marseille and the wider Provence region. Le Panier, a district of Marseille, became a Corsican neighbourhood as it and surrounding areas were flooded with large numbers of Corsican immigrants. Italian immigrants also lived in this area, and coexisted with the Corsicans due to a similar culture and similar situations of extreme poverty and mass emigration. Corsicans were one of the driving factors behind Marseille's rapid growth in the late 1800s.

Corsicans brought with them their language and customs, both of which were absorbed into the wider culture of Marseille. Corsican words are still present as slang in Marseille, and Corsican was the second-most spoken language in the city for most of the 1900s. Corsicans in the early period of mass migration mostly became sailors and dockworkers, working on Marseille's various ports. Many worked in other trades, and a large number also became soldiers and policemen.

=== Political influence and organised crime ===
Due to their large and rapidly growing population, Corsicans became an important political bloc within the politics of Marseille. As a result, many Corsicans became active in local politics, seeking to represent their own community. Every general councillor of Marseille's 3rd canton until 2021 has been Corsican.

Corsicans in the 1920s and 1930s, facing economic strife and intense discrimination from natives in Marseille, largely fell into populist and sometimes extremist ideologies. Simon Sabiani, a member of the Corsican diaspora and a former communist, became one of the most outspoken proponents of fascism in France. He served as deputy mayor of Marseille and also as a member of the French Chamber of Deputies. Sabiani became known as the "Mussolini of Marseille".

The most famous association of the Corsican diaspora in Marseille is the large presence of organised crime in the city. Corsicans, due to a clan structure very persistent in Corsican daily life at the time, often felt a strong allegiance to their families. Living in extreme poverty, even in the city, drove many Corsican families to enter organised crime businesses, starting some of Marseille's first mafias. Many Corsicans, due to discrimination, generational poverty, or other factors, could only make a living through crime.

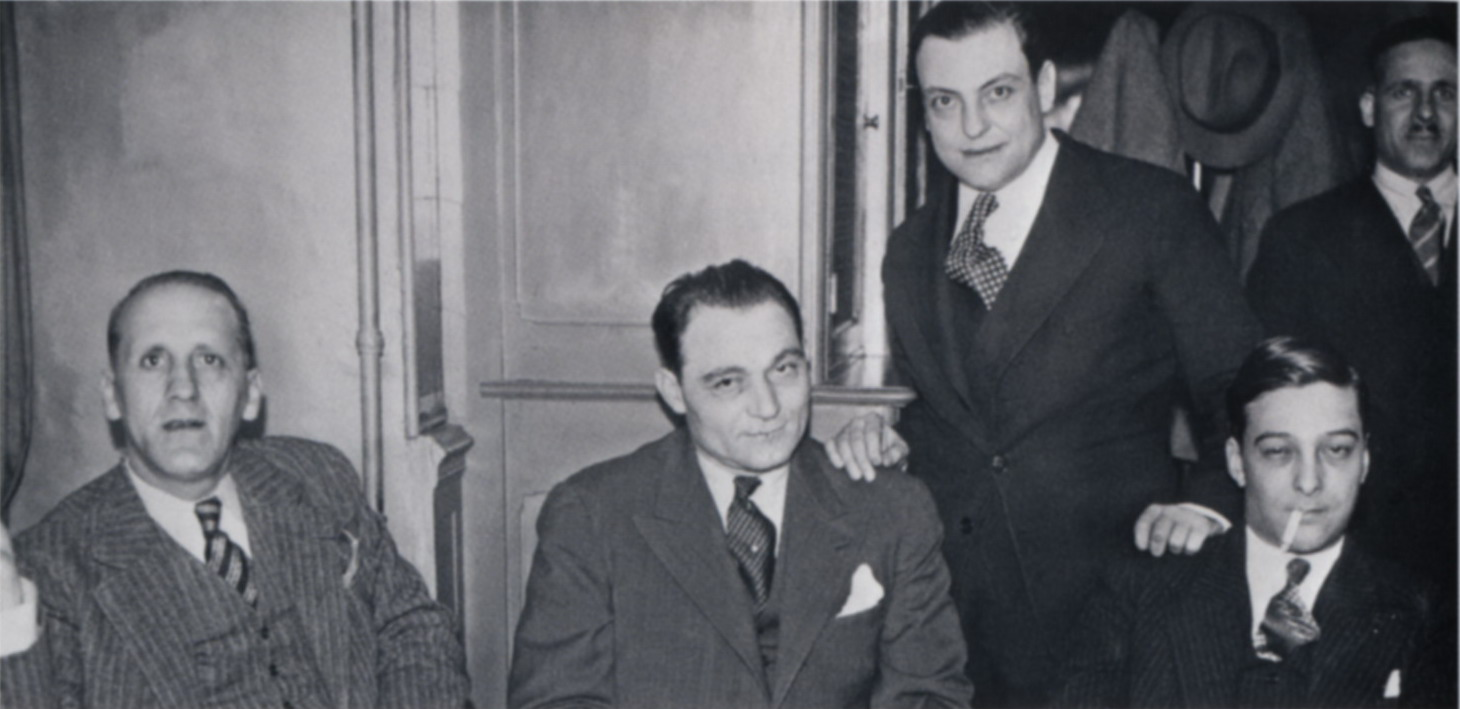
Simon Sabiani, Paul Carbone, and François Spirito

Corsican organised crime grew extremely large, and the Corsican crime network in Marseille quickly became the largest of the French "milieus". Corsican gangsters such as Paul Carbone and François Spirito ran many parts of daily and political life for most people living in Marseille. Simon Sabiani considered Spirito and Carbone close political allies and even "friends", and enlisted the help of Corsican gangs to protect his rallies and political events. Jean Chiappe, Paris police prefect and a Corsican himself, was a close associate of the Marseille crime circle. Marseille in American press became known as the "French Chicago" due to its rapid growth and important economic influence combined with the considerable influence of heavily armed gangs.

Following World War II, Marseille's Corsican gangs grew larger due to increased poverty and a post-war economic vacuum. The Corsican Guerini family became the new heads of organised crime in Marseille. They, alongside other Corsicans, created the Unione Corse, a ring of Corsican mafias responsible for directing the trade of heroin. With the partnership of American mobster Lucky Luciano, the Corsican mafia grew to dominate the worldwide heroin trade through a system known as the French Connection.

Marseille's reputation as a lawless, corrupt, and poor city only worsened throughout the this period, and Corsicans in mainland France became stereotyped as poor, corrupt, and violent people driving Marseille into further strife. Corsicans, since the initial wave of immigration in the 1880s and 1890s, had faced discrimination in Marseille (as they had all over France), but the 1960s was the peak of anti-Corsican sentiment in Marseille.

In 1947, Marseille elected its first Corsican mayor, Michel Carlini. Carlini was the son of a Corsican sailor who emigrated to Marseille in the 1880s.

=== Corsican conflict ===
Following the growth of Corsican nationalism in the 1970s, many Corsicans in Marseille became opposed to French control of Corsica. Many Corsicans in Marseille remained connected to the island, visiting family often using a ferry service established soon after the migrations began. Diaspora Corsicans often were the most nationalistic Corsicans, and many participated in the "Riaquistu", a movement in the early 1970s that resulted in the reclamation and revival of many aspects of Corsican culture. Various Corsican nationalist organisations and student unions emerged in Marseille, and after the outbreak of the Corsican conflict, Marseille became a major hub for fundraising and support for the National Liberation Front of Corsica in continental France.

The FLNC had a major presence in Marseille. Many of its descendants did as well, carrying out hundreds of bomb attacks in the city during their guerrilla campaigns.

In modern times, the Corsican mafia, which historically operated as the superiors to many small Maghrébin gangs, now operate in tandem and as equals with many, notably the DZ Mafia. The Corsican mafia continues to have significant influence over the city.

== In Aix-en-Provence ==
Corsican emigration to Aix-en-Provence began in the 1890s, shortly after the Corsican emigration to Marseille. Many went to Aix to escape poverty and for better job opportunities. Aix is home to the oldest Corsican diaspora association in France, founded in 1945.

Aix-Marseille University became a major hub for Corsican students in the mid 1970s, many of which were nationalist and supported the emerging armed struggle in Corsica. Small gangs of Corsican nationalists began committing petty crime in the city. One of these gangs was led by François Santoni, then a student at Aix-Marseille. Santoni would later become a prominent member of the National Liberation Front of Corsica, then a leader of the splinter FLNC-Canal Historique, then a leader of his own extremist faction, Armata Corsa. Santoni was assassinated in 2001.

== In Nice ==
Nice has a large Corsican diaspora population. Many study at the University of Côte d'Azur.

== In Toulon ==
Toulon has the oldest modern community of Corsicans in mainland France. Mass emigration of Corsicans to Toulon began in the 1860s and 1870s, before the migration of Corsicans to other parts of the mainland in the 1880s. This is largely due to the presence of the French Navy in the city, giving Corsicans job opportunities. In 1891, 50% of Corsicans in Toulon worked at the arsenal.

The majority of Corsicans in Toulon come from the north and centre of the island, particularly from areas around Bastia and Corte. Corsicans from the Balagne region, particularly around Calvi, were the initial Corsican immigrants in the 1860s.

Corsicans in Toulon, for most of their history, were working-class and poor residents, living in slums in the city. Many were socialists, participating in many socialist political ventures in the city in the early 1900s.

== Notable Corsicans from Provence ==
This is a list of notable Corsicans who were born or emigrated to Provence.

=== Musicians ===
- Patrick Fiori, born in Marseille in 1969
- Baptiste Giabiconi, born in Marignane in 1989
- Jenifer, born in Nice in 1982
- César Vezzani, born in Bastia in 1888, emigrated to Toulon in 1900
- Jul, born in Marseille in 1990

=== Politicians ===
- Michel Carlini, born in Marseille in 1889
- Charles Pasqua, born in Grasse in 1927
- Simon Sabiani, born in Casamaccioli in 1888, emigrated to Marseille in adolescence.

=== Sports ===
- Nicolas Penneteau, born in Marseille in 1981

=== Gangsters and criminals ===
- Paul Carbone, born in Propriano in 1894, emigrated to Marseille
- Marcel Francisci, born in Ciamannacce, emigrated to Marseille
- Jean-Pierre Hernandez, born in Carpentras
- Auguste Ricord, born in Marseille
- Pierre LaFitte, likely born in Corsica, emigrated to Marseille
