= Pierre Dominique =

Pierre Dominique Lucchini
- Born: 8/04/1889; Courtenay, France
- Died: 6/05/1973
- Occupations: Author, journalist, political activist, medical doctor
- Years active: 1923 to 1973
- Era: Interwar France
- Employer(s): La République, Europe Nouvelle Rivarol
- Notable work: Notre Dame de la Sagesse (1924)
- Political party: Action Française; Radical Party
- Awards: Knight of the Legion of Honour (1919) Balzac Prize [1924] Order of the Francisque

Pierre Dominique, pen-name of Pierre Dominique Lucchini (born 8 April 1889 in Courtenay (Loiret, France) – 6 May 1973 in Paris), was a French author, journalist, editorialist and political figure.

== Biography ==
Born to a Corsican family originating from the village of Aullène, Pierre Dominique studied medicine in Ajaccio, going on to practice a medical career first in Sartène, then the psychiatric hospital of Sainte Anne d'Auray (Paris). His two years as a military doctor on the Eastern Front during the First World War earned him a Legion of Honour.

After the war he published as an author, winning the 1924 Priz de Balzac for his Notre Dame de la Sagesse and the 1930 award from the Société des gens de lettres. He began work as a journalist for various Parisian newspapers, reporting on some of the revolutions convulsing postwar Europe: Italy, Poland, Russia and Spain.

During the 1920s his political loyalties evolved from French nationalism to Corsican separatism to Radical-socialism. Between 1920 and 1922, he was the head of the Corsican federation of Charles Maurras's hardline French nationalist movement, Action française. He then passed over to A Muvra, flagship of Petru Rocca's Corsican regionalist movement, a cause with which he was involved throughout the interwar: he participated in the Corsican Action Party from its foundation in 1922 until 1926, sitting on its executive committee, as well as co-organising the Estates-General of Corsica in 1934.

Between 1926 and 1940 Pierre Dominique's chief political involvement was with the French Radical-Socialist Party (PRRRS), the centre-left Radical party that dominated the Third Republic. In 1926 he founded his own centre-left journal, Le Petit-Phare, politically close to the left wing of the republican movement. This brought him into the orbit of the Young Turk Radicals led by Gaston Bergery and Édouard Daladier, a pressure group that sought a greater social and economic direction from the Radical-Socialist Party. From 1929 until the Second World War Pierre Dominique was editor-in-chief for the PRRRS's semi-official organ, La République. By 1932 he sat on the party's national committee. Once the Great Depression arrived, Pierre Dominique called for a far-reaching economic renovation by mobilising the resources of the French empire, strengthening the power of the executive over parliamentary institutions, and greater coordination at European level.

Although initially supporting the Popular Front he was fiercely opposed to the participation of the Communist Party, and after the general strikes of 1936 he was one of the main voices advocating that the PRRRS pursue an alliance with the liberal centre-right. In 1935, he was described as a comrade-in-arms by the French League against Racism and Antisemitism, and in La République in 1938 he vehemently denounced Nazi racism: "Germany seeks to conquer the world, but the world is watching and is repulsed by this horrifying descent into the heart of barbarism." But over the course of the 1930s, he drifted towards the authoritarian right. In 1941, after the Fall of France, he was put in charge of first the Vichy Regime's press censorship bureau, then its French Office of Information (1941–43), and was decorated with the Order of the Francisque.

After the Liberation he was tried for collaboration and acquitted. In 1966, he co-founded the Association of the Friends of French Socialism and the Commune. A fierce anticommunist, during the Cold War he contributed to the extreme-right journals Crapouillot et Rivarol, ending up as editor-in-chief of the latter after the death of René Malliavin in 1970.
