= Italian irredentism in Corsica =

Italian political and nationalist movement

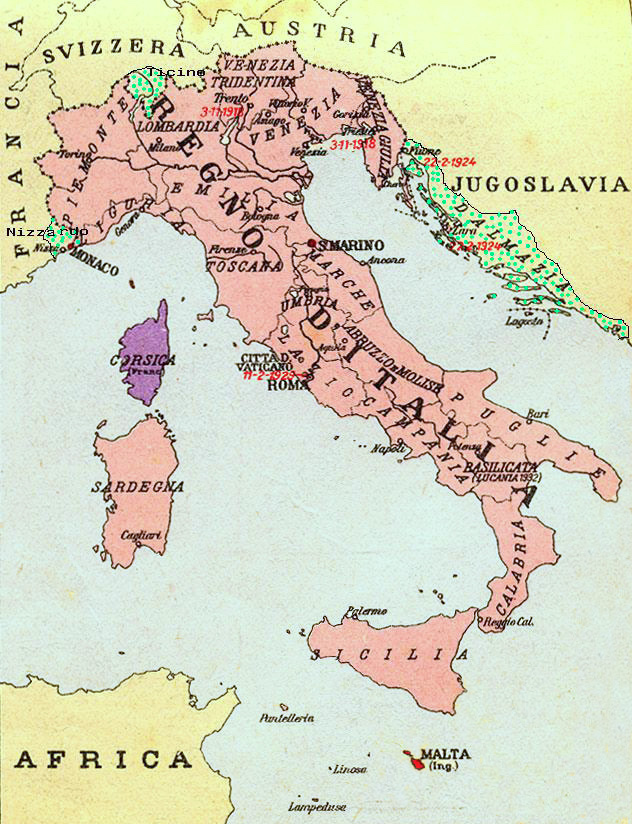
Italian ethnic regions claimed in the 1930s by the Italian irredentism: Green: Nice, Ticino and Dalmatia; Red: Malta; Violet: Corsica; Savoy and Corfu were later claimed.

Italian irredentism in Corsica was a cultural and historical movement promoted by Italians and by people from Corsica who identified themselves as part of Italy rather than France, and promoted the Italian annexation of the island.

== History ==
Corsica was part of the Republic of Genoa for centuries until 1768, when the Republic ceded the island to France, one year before the birth of Napoleon Bonaparte in the capital city of Ajaccio. Under France, the use of Corsican (a regional language closely related to Italian) has gradually declined in favour of the standard French language. Italian was the official language of Corsica until 1859.

Giuseppe Garibaldi called for the inclusion of the "Corsican Italians" within Italy when the city of Rome was annexed to the Kingdom of Italy, but Victor Emmanuel II did not agree to it.

The course of Italian irredentism did not affect Corsica very much, and only during the Fascist rule of Benito Mussolini were the first organizations strongly promoting the unification of the island to the Kingdom of Italy founded.

Before World War I in Livorno, professor Francesco Guerri founded the review Corsica antica e moderna, inspired on the Archivio storico di Corsica of Gioacchino Volpe. Petru Rocca created in the 1920s the Partito autonomista (Autonomist Party) of Corsica, of which he was the leader, with the support of monsignor Domenico Parlotti and dr. Croce, director of the "Archivi di Stato della Corsica".

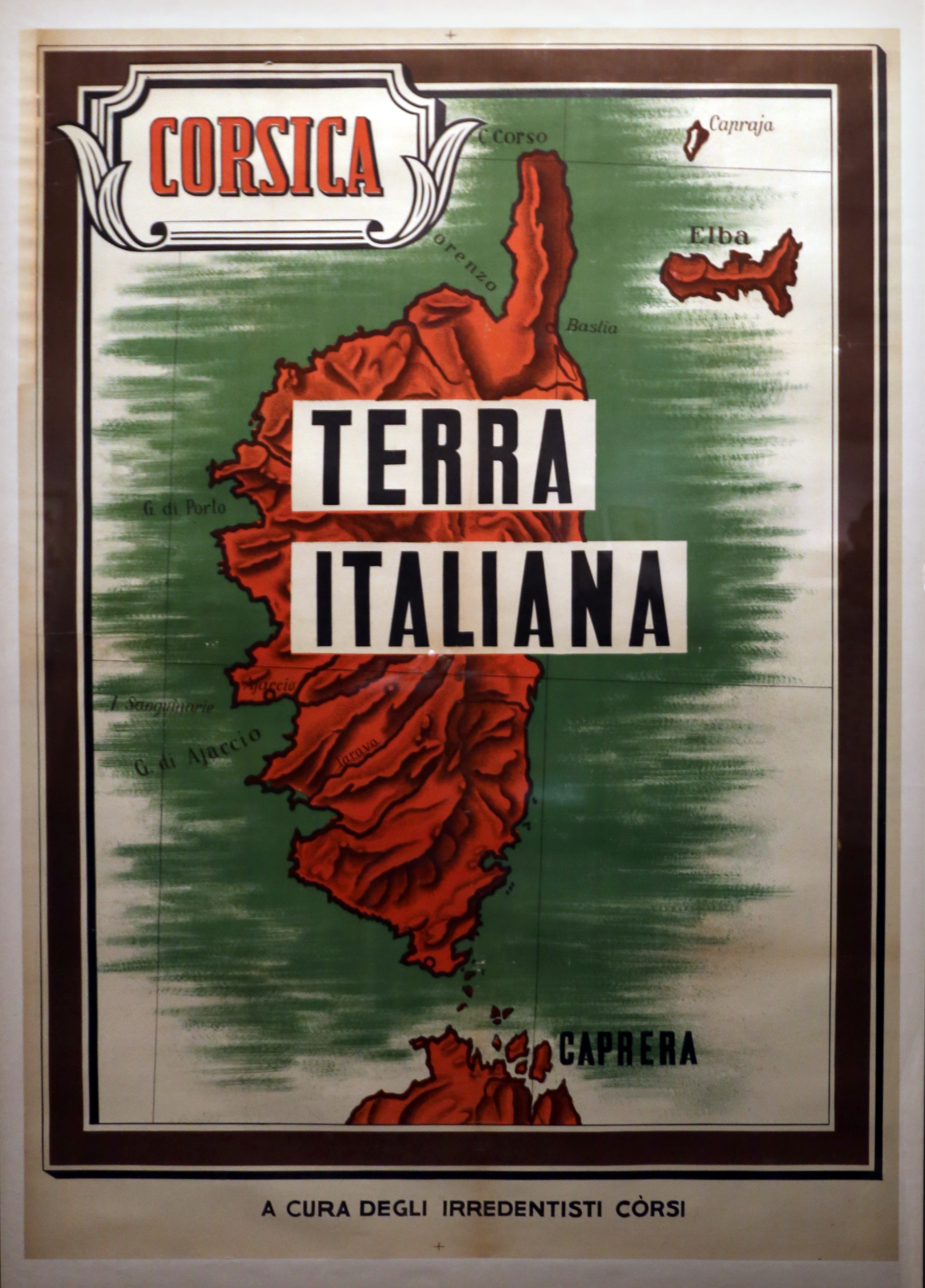
Corsican World War II irredentist propaganda

Before and during World War II, some Corsican intellectuals staged pro-Italian propaganda and cultural activities in Italy (mainly in the Gruppi di Cultura Corsa "Corsican culture Associations"). These included Marco Angeli, Bertino Poli, Marchetti, Luccarotti, Grimaldi, and finally Petru Giovacchini, who was later proposed as a possible governor of Corsica in case Italy had annexed it. The most renowned was Petru Giovacchini, who considered Pasquale Paoli (the hero of Corsica) as the precursor of Corsican irredentism in favor of the unification of the island to Italy. The "Gruppi di Cultura Corsa" of Giovacchini reached a membership of 72,000 members by 1940, according to the historian R.H. Rainero.

In November 1942 the VII Army Corps of the Regio Esercito occupied Corsica as part of the German-led response to the Allied landings in Africa, leaving the island still under the formal sovereignty of Vichy France. Because of the lack of partisan resistance at first, and to avoid problems with Marshal Philippe Pétain, no Corsican units were formed under Italian control (except for a labour battalion formed in March 1943). However, a Resistance movement based on local inhabitants loyal to France and boosted by Free French leaders developed, opposing the irredentist propaganda and the Italian occupation, and was repressed by the fascist forces and subsequently by German troops.

Some irredentist Corsican military officials collaborated with Italy, including the retired Major Pantalacci (and his son Antonio), colonel Mondielli and colonel Petru Simone Cristofini (and his wife, the first Corsican female journalist Marta Renucci). After Free French forces and Resistance forces, together with some Italian troops who sided with the Allies, retook Corsica, Petru Cristofini was executed in 1943. Petru Giovacchini was also condemned to death, but fled to Italy where he found refuge until his death in 1955. Italian irredentism as an active movement in Corsica essentially died out with him.

=== Pietro Cristofini ===
Colonel Pietro Cristofini (or Petru Simon Cristofini) was born in Calenzana (near Calvi, Corsica) on 26 May 1903 and in 1939 became a captain of the 3rd Algerian Fusiliers regiment. He was initially a supporter of Pétain. After the Allied occupation of French North Africa he commanded the Phalange Africaine.

In Tunisia, he was wounded in one eye and then, before returning to Corsica, met Benito Mussolini in Rome. He was a supporter of the union of Corsica to Italy and defended irredentist ideals. He actively collaborated with Italian forces in Corsica during the first months of 1943. In the island he worked with Petru Giovacchini (the possible governor of Corsica if the Axis had won the war). Cristofini, as head of the Ajaccio troops, helped the Italian Army to repress the Resistance opposition in Corsica before the Italian Armistice in September 1943.

He was put on trial for treason after the Allies retook Corsica, and sentenced to death. He tried to kill himself, and was executed while suffering from his wounds in November 1943. His wife, Marta Renucci, was sentenced in 1946 to 15 years of jail in Algiers for supporting irredentism and for collaborating with Italian fascism, but served only a reduced sentence.

== Language ==
While Corsican was spoken at home as a local vernacular, Italian had been the public and literary language on the island until the first half of the 19th century.

The Constitution, written in 1755 for the short-lived Corsican Republic, was written in Italian and Paoli proclaimed Italian as the sole official language of Corsica. Italian had been the prestige language in Corsica until the end of the 19th century. Even Paoli's second Corsican Constitution, for the Anglo-Corsican Kingdom in 1794, was in Italian. In the second half of the 19th century French replaced Italian, mainly because of Napoleon III. Corsican started to be used by Corsican intellectuals.

The modern varieties of Corsican (corsu) are directly related to the Tuscan dialect of Pisa, an Italian city that dominated the island before Genoa. In the north of the island (Calvi), there was also a local dialect (now nearly extinct) very similar to medieval Genoese. In the mountainous interior of Corsica, many villagers have some proficiency of Corsican, a medieval Pisan lect.

The similarity of Corsican to Italian, because of their common Tuscan origin, can be seen in an example phrase: "I was born in Corsica and I spent there the best years of my youth".

Sò natu in Corsica è v'aghju passatu i megli anni di a mio ghjuventù (Corsican);
Sono nato in Corsica e vi ho passato i migliori anni della mia gioventù (Italian);
Je suis né en Corse et j'y ai passé les meilleurs années de ma jeunesse (French).

Nearly 12% of Corsicans can speak Italian as a foreign language nowadays, while three-quarters understand it thanks to the television programmes from Italy.

The irredentist Marco Angeli di Sartèna wrote the first book in Corsican (titled Terra còrsa) in 1924 and many lyrics (titled Malincunie) in Ajaccio. He created and wrote the newspaper «Gioventù» of the Partito Corso d'azione ("Corsican Action Party"), partially in Italian and Corsican.

== Pasquale Paoli and Italian irredentism ==
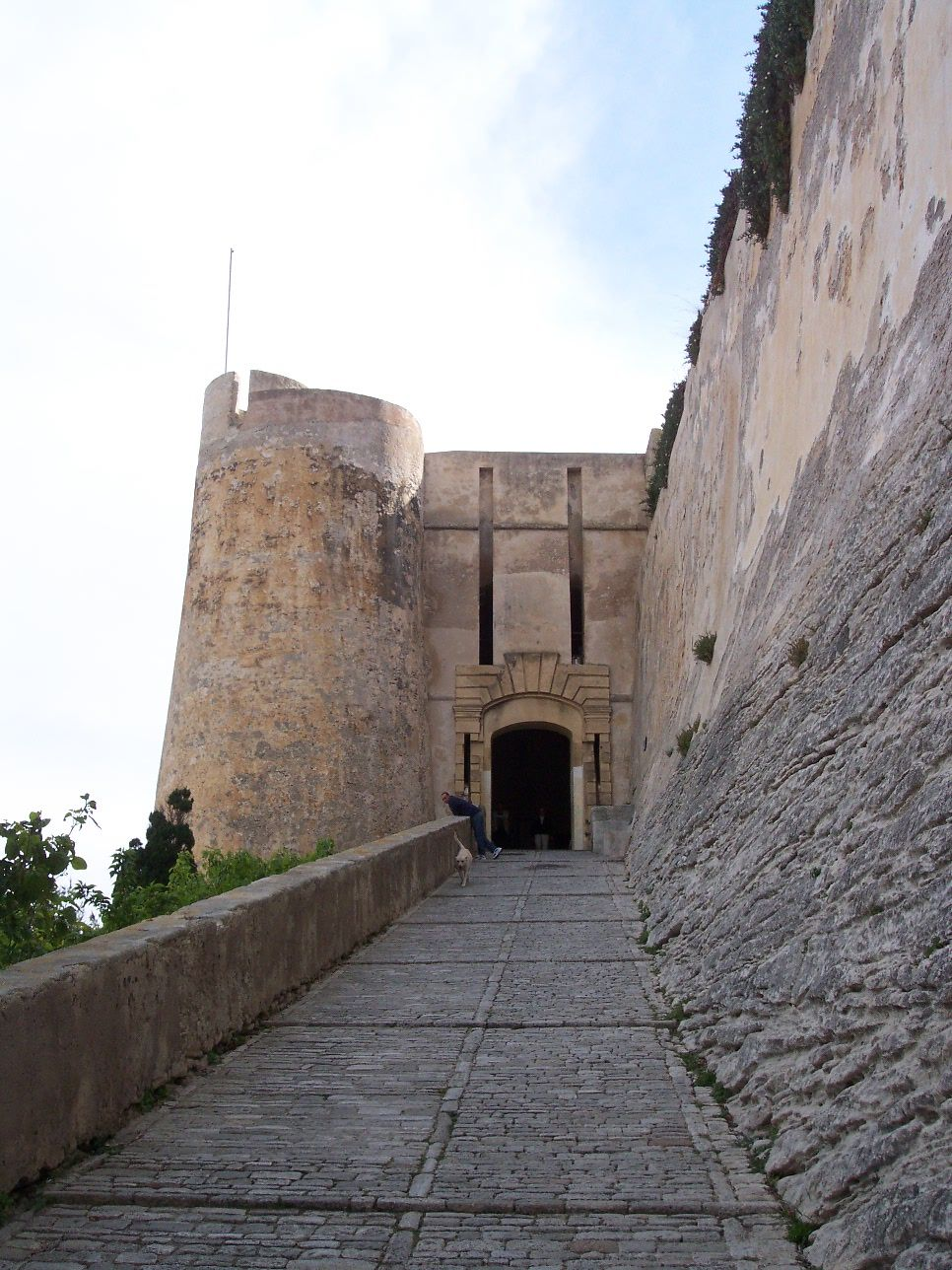
The "Porta dei Genovesi" in Bonifacio, a city where some inhabitants still speak a Genoese dialect

Pasquale Paoli was considered by Niccolò Tommaseo, who collected his Lettere (Letters), as one of the precursors of Italian irredentism. Paoli was sympathetic to Italian culture and regarded his own native language as an Italian dialect (Corsican is an Italo-Dalmatian tongue closely related to Tuscan). The Babbu di a Patria ("Homeland's father"), as Pasquale Paoli was nicknamed by the Corsican separatists, wrote in his Letters the following message in 1768 against the French:

We are Corsicans by birth and sentiment, but first of all we feel Italian by language, origins, customs, traditions; and Italians are all brothers and united in the face of history and in the face of God ... As Corsicans we wish to be neither slaves nor "rebels" and as Italians we have the right to deal as equals with the other Italian brothers ... Either we shall be free or we shall be nothing... Either we shall win or we shall die, weapons in hand ... The war against France is right and holy as the name of God is holy and right, and here on our mountains will appear for Italy the sun of liberty....

Pasquale Paoli wanted the Italian language to be the official language of his Corsican Republic. His Corsican Constitution of 1755 was in Italian and was used as a model for the American constitution of 1787. Furthermore, in 1765 Paoli founded in the city of Corte the first University of Corsica (where the teaching was done in Italian).

== Literature ==
The Florentine dialect promoted by the Corsican Italians, had been the language of culture in Corsica since the Renaissance. Many Corsican authors wrote an extensive literature in Italian in the last centuries.

In the 14th century there was La Cronica of Giovanni della Grossa (1388-1464), Pier Antonio Monteggiani (1464-1525) and Marcantoni Ceccaldi (1526-1559). Storia di Corsica was published in 1594 by Anton Pietro Filippini. In the 15th and 16th centuries there were Ignazio Cardini (1566-1602), Pietro Cirneo (1447-1507), Guiglielmo Guglielmi di Orezza (1644-1728) with A Malannata and Ottave giocose.

In the 18th century, the Accademia dei Vagabondi was founded in Bastia, following the model of the Italian "Accademie". Angelo Francesco Colonna wrote Commentario delle glorie e prerogative del Regno e Popoli di Corsica in 1685.

During the Corsican Republic of Pasquale Paoli, there were Giulio Matteo Natali (Disinganno intorno alla Guerra de Corsica in 1736), Don Gregorio Salvini (Giustificazione della Revoluzione di Corsica (1758-1764)) and the same Pasquale Paoli (Corrispondenza, published only in 1846).

During the 19th century in Bastia, Salvatore Viale wrote La Dionomachia in 1817, Canti popolari corsi in 1843 and Dell'uso della lingua patria in Corsica in 1858, where he lamented the decline in the use of Italian language as a learned language in favor of French.

Many Corsican authors (who wrote in Italian) were influenced by the ideals of the Italian Risorgimento during the second half of the 19th century, such as Giuseppe Multado, Gian Paolo Borghetti, Francesco Ottaviano Renucci (Storia della Corsica dal 1789 al 1830 and Novelle storiche corse). Even the Italian Niccolò Tommaseo collected the Canti popolari corsi (with points of view of Italian irredentism) and made a compilation of the letters (Lettere di Pasquale de Paoli) of Pasquale Paoli.

Santu Casanova founded the famous literary review A Tramuntana (published in Ajaccio between 1896 and 1914) and wrote in Italian Meraviglioso testamento di Francesco in 1875 and La morte ed il funerale di Spanetto in 1892. He is considered the link between the old generations of Corsican writers who wrote in Italian language and the new ones, who started to use the Corsican language.

During the first half of the 20th century, the most important Corsican publication in Italian was the literary review A Muvra of Petru Rocca. Other Corsican authors in Italian were Domenicu Versini (nicknamed Maistrale), Matteu Rocca (I lucchetti in 1925), Dumenicu Carlotti (Pampame corse in 1926), Ageniu Grimaldi and Ugo Babbiziu (Una filza di francesismi colti nelle parlate dialettali corse in 1930).

The Corsican Italians who promoted the ideal of Corsican irredentism published mainly in Italy, because of the persecutions from the French regime in the island in the first half of the 20th century.

Thus, Petru Giovacchini wrote the poems Musa Canalinca and Rime notturne in 1933 in Corsica, but successively wrote and published Aurore, poesie corse, Corsica Nostra and Archiatri pontifici corsi in Rome (the last, while he was in exile in 1951, a few years before his premature death).

The irredentist Marco Angeli published in Milan Gigli di Stagnu and Liriche corse in 1934 and Bertino Poli wrote Il pensiero irredentista corso e le sue polemiche in Florence in 1940.

== Notable Corsican Italians ==
Small list of renowned Corsican Italians:

- Marco Angeli di Sartèna, founder of newspaper «Gioventù» of the "Partito Corso d'azione" and writer/poet.
- Count Leonetto Cipriani, aristocrat and politician, and adventurer in the Americas.
- Petru Simone Cristofini, irredentist colonel who was executed for treason in 1943.
- Petru Giovacchini, irredentist candidate for Governor of Italian Corsica during WWII.
- Marta Renucci, first Corsican female journalist.
- Petru Rocca, founder of the Partito autonomista of Corsica and publisher of A Muvra literary review.

== See also ==
- Corsican people
- Petru Giovacchini
- Italia irredenta
- Italian occupation of Corsica
- Italian occupation of France
- Pietro Rocca

== Bibliography ==
- Durand, Olivier. La lingua còrsa. Paideia Editrice, Brescia, 2003 ISBN 88-394-0674-3
- Fusina, Jacques. Parlons Corse. Éditions L'Harmattan, Paris, 1999
- Mastroserio, Giuseppe. Petru Giovacchini – Un Patriota esule in Patria. Editrice Proto. Bari, 2004.
- Melillo, A.M. Profilo dei dialetti italiani: Corsica. Pacini Editore. Pisa, 1977.
- Rainero, R.H. Mussolini e Pétain. Storia dei rapporti tra l’Italia e la Francia di Vichy (10 giugno 1940-8 settembre 1943). Ussme Ed. Roma, 1990.
- Saint-Blancac, C. La Corsica. Identità Etnico-Linguistica e Sviluppo. CEDAM, Padova, 1993
- Tommaseo, Niccoló. Lettere di Pasquale de Paoli. Archivio storico italiano, 1st series, vol. XI. Roma
- Vignoli, Giulio. Gli Italiani Dimenticati Ed. Giuffè. Roma, 2000
- Vita e Tragedia dell'Irredentismo Corso, Rivista Storia Verità, n.4, 1997
- Il Martirio di un irredento: il colonnello Petru Simone Cristofini. Rivista Storia Verità, n.11, 1998.
