= Dhu'l-Suwayqatayn =

Prophetic figure in Islamic Eschatology

Dhu'l-Suwayqatayn (Arabic: ذو السويقتين, romanized: ḏū s-suwayqatayn, lit. 'the man with two thin legs', Amharic: ዱል-ሱወይቃታይን) is a figure mentioned in many hadith of the Islamic prophet Muhammad.

These describe an Abyssinian (Ethiopian) destined to permanently destroy the Ka'ba brick by brick and remove its treasure. At this time faith in God will have disappeared, so the destruction will go unnoticed. in several Hadith, Mohammed specifically warns his followers not to attack Abyssinia without provocation because of this prophecy.

Dhu'l-Suwayqatayn is described in the hadiths as being black, short, bald and with "thin legs", which is often interpreted as meaning they are deformed

== Hadiths ==
References to this are recorded in all six traditional Sunni compilations of hadith, the Kutub al-Sitta, including the earliest and the most revered ones, namely Sahih al-Bukhari and Sahih Muslim. The tradition is likely related to the Year of the Elephant, when the Axumite general Abraha is said to have attacked Mecca.

=== Hadith describing Dhu'l-Suwayqatayn and destruction of Ka'ba ===
The Prophet (ﷺ) said, "As if I were looking at him, a black person with thin legs plucking the stones of the Ka`ba one after another. "

Allah's Messenger (ﷺ) said, "Dhus-Suwaiqatain (the thin legged man) from Ethiopia will demolish the Ka`ba."

The Ka'ba would be destroyed by an Abyssinian having two small shanks.

"The Messenger of Allah said: 'The Kabah will be destroyed by Dhul-Suwaiqatan (one with thin legs) from Ethiopia.'"

It would be an Abyssinian having two small shanks who would destroy the House ol Allah, the Exalted and Glorious.

The Prophet;; said, "Dhus-Suwaiqa-tain (literally: One with two lean legs) from Ethiopia will demolish the Ka`ba."

Abu Huraira reported God’s messenger as saying, “An Abyssinian with short legs will destroy the Ka'ba.”

=== Hadith warning Muslims not to attack Abyssinia ===
The Prophet (ﷺ) said: Leave the Abyssinians alone as long as they leave you alone, for it is only the Abyssinian with short legs who will seek to take out the treasure of the Ka'bah.

`Abdallah b. `Amr reported the Prophet as saying, "Leave the Abyssinians alone as long as they leave you alone, for it is only the Abyssinian with short legs who will seek to take out the treasure of the Ka'ba." Abu Dawud transmitted it.

=== End time hadith ===
The people of Makkah will leave and no one will come to it-or no one will come to it except a few-then it will be filled and built up, then they will leave it and never return to it.`

== Interpretation ==
Abd Allah ibn Amr ibn al-As and Ibn Kathir interpreted that this will occur after the second coming of Yeshua (Isa) (AKA Jesus Christ), in the end times.

== In other religions ==
Following the Fifth Crusade (1217–1221), this tradition was transferred to Europe when Bishop Oliver of Paderborn's Historia Damiatina described a Nubian king as an omen indicating the end of Islam.

Pierre d'Avity's "The Estate of the Empire of Presbyter Iohn" similarly describes a prophecy of a new Reformer rising from the Church of Rome around the year 1520, with the Franks supposedly conquering Tours, Ziden, Mecca, and Egypt. It also mentions the prophecy of Dhu'l-Suwayqatayn and the Abyssinian destruction of the Islamic holy sites, including the sepulchre of the Islamic prophet Muhammad.

== See also ==
- Dhu'l-Qarnayn
