= Michel Carlini =

French politician

Mayor of Marseille
- In office 1947–1953
- Preceded by: Jean Cristofol
- Succeeded by: Gaston Defferre

Personal details
- Born: 31 July 1889 Marseille, France
- Died: 25 November 1967 (aged 78) Marseille, France
- Party: RPF
- Profession: Lawyer

Michel Carlini (French pronunciation: [miʃɛl kaʁlini]; 1889, Marseille – 1967) was a French politician. He served as the Mayor of Marseille, France's second largest city, from 1947 to 1953, and as a member of the National Assembly of France for the Bouches-du-Rhone from 1951 to 1955. He was a member of the center-right Rally of the French People political party, started by General Charles de Gaulle.

== Biography ==
Michel Charles Carlini was born on 31 July 1889 to Corsican parents in Marseille. His father was a sailor from the Capocorso region who had emigrated with his family during the first wave of Corsican immigration to Provence. He received a PhD in Law with merit. He then fought in the First World War, and received the Croix de Guerre and the Croix de Verdun. After the war, he worked as a lawyer again, married in 1926, and became Dean of the Law School before 1939. He was also involved with the Red Cross.

He became Mayor of Marseille in 1947, and battled with Communist strikers and demonstrators, up until 1953. At one point, he had to pretend to step down to assuage the protesters. In 1955, he did not support the government of Pierre Mendès France. In 1954, he voted against the European Defence Community. In 1956, he ran again for the National Assembly of France, and lost. He helped put together a collection in the Musée de Bastia in Corsica. He died in Marseille in 1967.
