= Jean-Pierre Hernandez =

French gangster and writer (1935–2024)

- Born: 31 May 1935; Carpentras, France
- Died: 25 October 2024 (aged 89)
- Occupations: Gangster; Writer
- Children: 3

Jean-Pierre Hernandez (31 May 1935 – 25 October 2024) was a French gangster and writer. A onetime caïd of the French Connection, he was imprisoned and lived in hiding for 13 years.

== Biography ==
Born in Carpentras on 31 May 1935, Hernandez was raised by a Corsican mother. He began working as a buyer for his first wife's father and made contacts in organized crime. These contacts led him to the French Connection, where he participated between 1960 and 1990. He was heavily involved in heroin trafficking with Tany Zampa, one of the godfathers of Jean-Louis Fargette. He was eventually arrested alongside 30 other people and sentenced to a light five-year sentence due to a lack of substantiative evidence. However, he managed to escape from prison and lived in hiding for 13 years between France and Germany. In his 2011 book Confessions d'un caïd, he revealed that Maurice Agnelet was wrongfully convicted in the disappearance of Agnès Le Roux. He wrote that one of his fellow gangsters, Jeannot Lucchesi, had confessed to him in the 1980s to killing Le Roux and dumping her body in Les Goudes.

Hernandez died on 25 October 2024, at the age of 89.

== Publications ==
- Confessions d'un caïd (2011)
- Quand j’étais gangster (2014)
