= Marco Angeli di Sartèna =

French politician

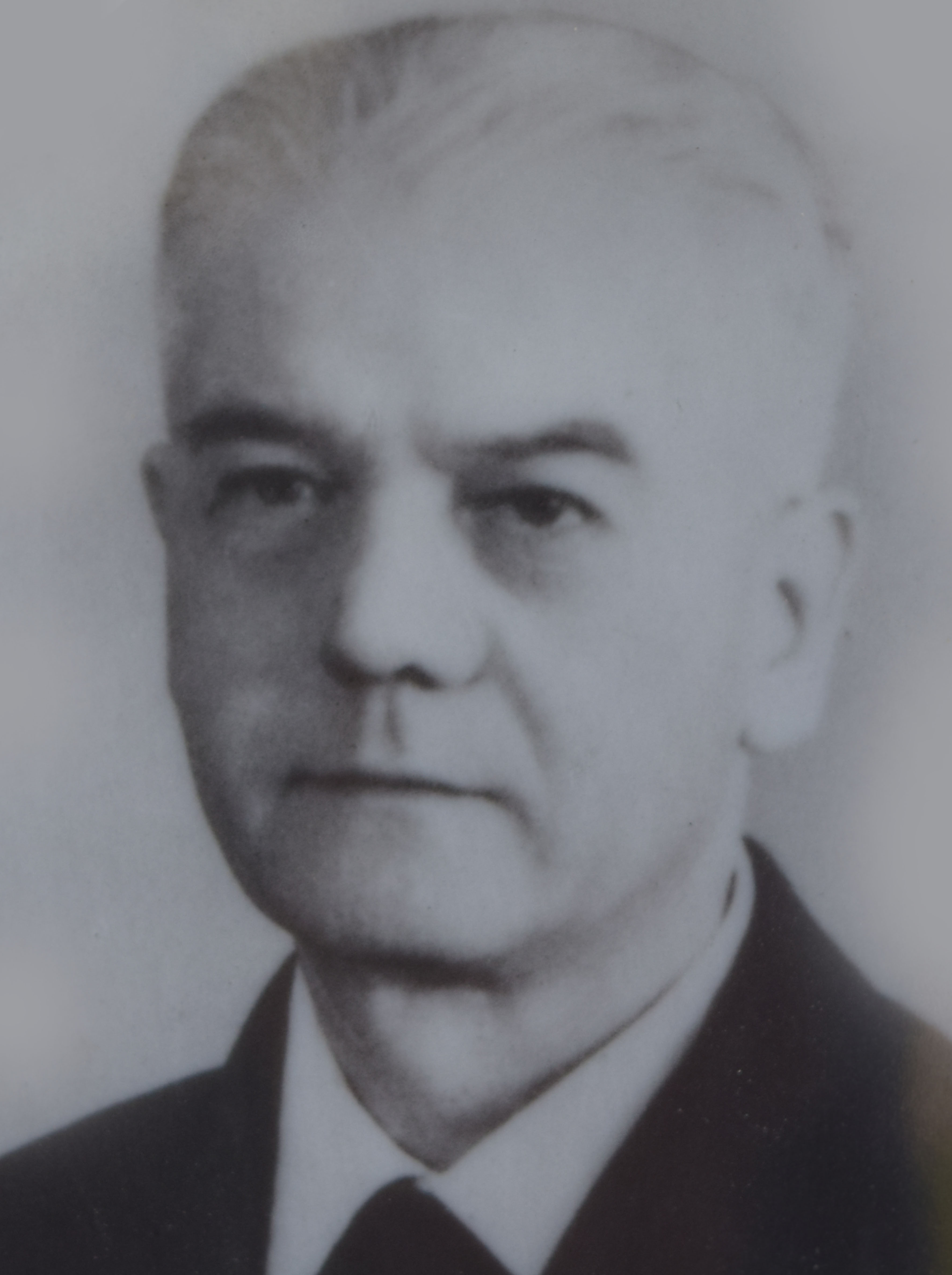
Marco Angeli

Marco Angeli di Sartena (1905-1985) was a politician from Corsica, who wrote for the literary review magazine A Muvra. He was an active irredentist, supporting the union of Corsica to Italy.

== Life ==
He was born in Sartena, from a Corsican family with roots in the Republic of Genoa. After moving to Italy because of his irredentism ideals, he graduated in medicine at the University of Pisa.

The irredentist Marco Angeli di Sartèna wrote in 1924 the first book in "Corso" (titled Terra còrsa) and many lyrics in this dialect/language (titled Malincunie) in Ajaccio. He even created and wrote the newspaper «Gioventù» of the "Partito Corso d'azione", partially in Italian and Corsican.

In 1930 Marco Angeli created the "Gruppi d'Azione Corsa", which did a huge propaganda in Italy and Corsica against France's control of the island: already in 1931 it had more than one thousand members. He had friendship with Pietro Rocca and influenced him to become an irredentist.

In the spring of 1943 Angeli returned with Petru Giovacchini to his Corsica -occupied by Italian troops in November 1942- in order to try to promote an administrative union of the island to the Kingdom of Italy (like Dalmatia): but he was unsuccessful because of Nazi German opposition.

After the Italian defeat in World War II Angeli was condemned to death by a French tribunal, but he escaped the punishment by remaining in Italy for the rest of his life.

== Bibliography ==
- Rainero, R.H. Mussolini e Pétain. Storia dei rapporti tra l’Italia e la Francia di Vichy. Ussme Ed. Roma, 1990

== See also ==
- Italian irredentism in Corsica
