= Tony Comiti =

French journalist

Tony Comiti (born May 23, 1950, Paris) is a French journalist of Corsican descent. He founded and headed Tony Comiti Productions, a press and production agency established in 1993.

== Career ==
In 1978, Tony Comiti captured iconic photographs of Jacques Mesrine leaving his cell in the high-security wing of La Santé prison to go for a walk. Taken surreptitiously while the photographer lay in wait, this image appears on the cover of L’instinct de mort, Mesrine's autobiography, in the edition published in 2008.

For TF1’s news programs and magazines, Comiti covered, among other events, the Coups d’état in Bolivia (1978–1980) and Venezuela (1989 and 1992), the war in Chad (1978–1987), the Contras in Nicaragua (1979–1990), as well as the Iran-Iraq conflict in the 1980s and the conflict in Sri Lanka.

Between 1987 and 1988, Jean Bertolino and Comiti produced a report on drug trafficking in Colombia. Two meetings took place, in December 1987 and March 1988, during which Bertolino and Comiti filmed their report from within the traffickers' own hideout. As a condition, the filmmakers agreed to show the footage to the group before its broadcast; however, Fabio Ochoa vetoed it. This documentary, titled Le Cartel de Medellín, was ultimately not broadcast until after Pablo Escobar’s death, due to pressure and death threats from the Colombian mafia.

== Awards ==
- Emmy Award nomination for Chili: mon voisin est un tortionnaire, by Tony Comiti and Manolo d'Arthuys (1999)
- Nomination for the Albert-Londres Prize for Sicile: des prêtres contre la Mafia by Tony Comiti and Patrick Charles-Messance (1990)
