= Jean Cristofol =

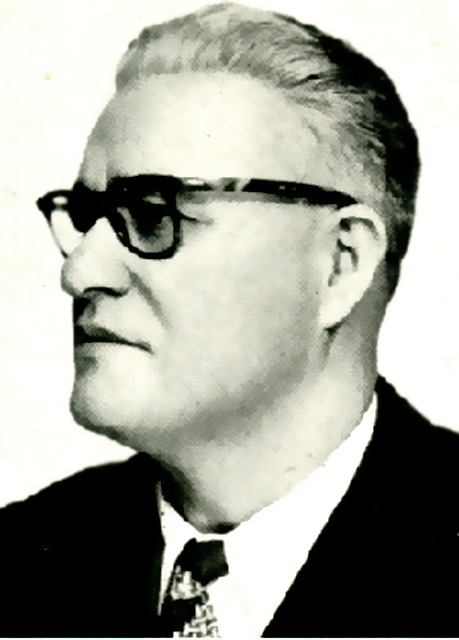
- Jean Cristofol

Mayor of Marseille
- In office 1946–1947
- Succeeded by: Michel Carlini

Personal details
- Born: 24 March 1901 Puigcerdà, Spain
- Died: 21 November 1957 (aged 56) Villejuif, France
- Party: PCF

Jean Cristofol (French pronunciation: [ʒɑ̃ kʁistɔfɔl]; 1901–1957) was a French Communist politician. He was a député in the National Assembly of France from 1936 to 1940, and from 1946 to 1957, then Mayor of Marseille, the second largest city in France, from 1946 to 1947.

== Biography ==
Jean Joseph Antoine Cristofol was born on 24 March 1901 in Aja-Vilallovent,. He became a député in the French National Assembly in 1936. In April 1940, he was sent to prison by the Vichy government for being a Communist. He was released in 1943, and became a député again in 1944. He was the Mayor of Marseille from 1946 to 1947. He died on 21 November 1957 in Villejuif, France.
