= Jean Bertolino =

French journalist and writer

Jean Bertolino (born 31 March 1936 in Marseille) is a French journalist and writer.

== Biography ==
A former student at the École supérieure de journalisme de Paris (class 1959–1961), a senior reporter and war correspondent, Bertolino worked for La Croix, Le Monde, Le Figaro and several provincial dailies. He was awarded the Albert Londres Prize in 1967 for his coverage of Vietnam and Cambodia at war and the revolt of the Kurds in Iraq, published in the newspaper La Croix and reprinted by numerous foreign newspapers.

In 1987, he became responsible for the reporting department at TF1, a public channel with which he had been collaborating since 1983. From 1988, he was the producer of 52 sur la Une, a magazine whose last issue was presented in June 2001.

Between 1987 and 1988, Bertolino and Tony Comiti produced a report on drug trafficking in Colombia. This documentary, titled Le Cartel de Medellín, was ultimately not broadcast until after Pablo Escobar’s death.

He is also the author of novels.

== Works ==
- 1968: Vietnam sanglant, Stock
- 1969: Les Trublions, Stock
- 1974: Les Orangers de Jaffa, Éditions France-Empire
- 1979: Albanie, la sentinelle de Staline, Éditions du Seuil
- 1993: Histoires vécues, L'Archipel
- 1997: Madame l'Etoile, Flammarion
- 1998: La Frontière des fous, Flammarion
- 2000: Le Chant du Farou, Alzieu
- 2002: Chaman, Presses de la Cité
- 2004: Fura-Tena, Presses de la Cité
- 2010: Pour qu'il ne meure jamais, Calmann-Lévy
- 2014: Et je te donnerai les trésors des ténèbres, Calmann-Lévy

== Prizes ==
- Prix Albert Londres 1967.
- Grand Prix de Poésie 2011 of the Société des poètes et artistes de France (SPAF) for all his writings in prose - articles, novels, great reports - and lyrics.
