= Anti-Corsican sentiment =

Anti-Corsican sentiment or Anti-Corsianism is hostility, rejection, discrimination against and/or hatred towards Corsica, Corsican culture or the Corsican ethnic group. In the 21st century, some denounce the use of the term as a victimization phenomenon.

== Stereotypes of Corsicans ==
Some stereotypes of Corsicans include that they don't like tourists, that they are racist or lazy, or that they are terrorists or members of mafia groups.

== History ==
=== Antiquity ===
The Greek geographer Strabo wrote: «The island of Cyrnos, which the Romans call Corsica, is a terrible country to inhabit, given the harsh nature of the soil and the almost absolute lack of passable roads, which means that the populations are confined to the mountains and reduced to living by banditry, are wilder than wild beasts. This is what we can, moreover, verify without leaving Rome, because it often happens that the Roman generals make raids on the island, unexpectedly attack some of the fortresses of these barbarians and thus remove a large number of slaves; we can then closely observe the strange physiognomy of these men, fierce like the beasts of the woods or stupid like cattle, who cannot bear to live in servitude, or who, if they resign themselves not to die, wear out the masters who bought them with their apathy and insensitivity, to the point of making them regret the little money they cost them. There are, however, certain portions of the island, which are strictly habitable, and where we even find a few small towns, such as Blésinon, Charax, Eniconiæ and Vapanes.»

=== Republic of Genoa ===
The Corsican population was oppressed under the Genoese domination of the island. The Corsicans were notably overtaxed, despised and most were forcibly expelled from certain large cities, notably Bonifacio and Calvi.

=== France ===
In France, well before the annexation of Corsica by France, descriptions devalue the Corsican population. According to Pierre Davity, the Corsicans are hardly civilized for the most part and there is not in them this politeness that the we see among the Italians. They would be described as "extremely cruel" however Davity notes that they would be brave soldiers.

During the Napoleonic period, the royalists took up the Corsican name of Napoleon Bonaparte, Buonaparte, because they did not recognize his imperial dignity acquired due to his ethnic origins after the breakdown of the Peace of Amiens (1803) and thus refused to use only his first name, sign of his title.

The writer Victor Hugo notably wrote: «Each state has its slave, each kingdom drags its ball and chain. Turkey has Greece, Russia has Poland, England has Ireland and France has Corsica. Alongside each master people, a people of slaves. Poorly built building: half marble, half plaster.»

In 1890, the trip of President Sadi Carnot to Corsica was recounted in Le petit journal, with a circulation of more than a million copies, in an article entitled: «The President among the savages.»

=== North Africa ===
The Corsicans were one of the ethnic groups victimized by the Barbary slave trade and were favored targets for North African slavers and pirates, as a result, many coastal villages were raided by Ottoman fleets. However, some corsairs who kidnapped Corsicans were themselves of Corsican origin who had been kidnapped decades earlier by the Barbarys.

== Present day ==
On French social networks, Corsicans are one of the most stereotyped groups and subject to hostility. There was also an awkwardness on the part of Agence France-Presse following a case of racism by speaking directly about Corsica before mentioning that the case is taking place throughout France.

Television host Laurent Ruquier has attracted controversy several times for his hostile jokes towards Corsicans. In 2001, he declared, "Discreetly, Jospin gave himself a little pleasure by firing Zuccarelli: blowing up a Corsican without us hearing the sound of the explosion". He notably declared in 2011, "In Corsica, there are elected officials, beaten elected officials and dejected elected officials. We went from prefects to mayors. When it comes to job cuts on the Isle of Beauty, we're not doing any better".

Interior Minister Manuel Valls declared in 2013 that "Violence is rooted in Corsican culture" following the assassination of PNRC president Jean-Luc Chiappini and asked Corsicans to support French justice. The comments were highlighted and outraged several Corsicans, one of whom questioned him about his comments: “I wanted to tell you that I am Corsican, I work for Corsica and for me violence is not at all part of my culture. I believe that the violence today in Corsica is part of a political and economic context that is difficult to control. But it's a little disheartening to hear that it's part of our culture. It's like there's nothing we can do about it." Many French people disapproved of Manuel Valls' comments.

Comments on social networks also report calls to «must get rid of this island», describing the Corsican population as “inbred” or others like «The only ones who work in your country are the funeral directors because you're shooting at each other like idiots.» or «I want to invest in a bacteriological bomb that I send to Corsica»

In 2023, the attack on a father and his eight-year-old son sick with cancer, supporters of Olympique de Marseille, by supporters of AC Ajaccio leads to an increase in hostility against the Corsicans.
