= Simon Petru Cristofini =

Corsican soldier executed by France for treason

Simon Petru Cristofini (1903–1943), also known as Pietro Simone Cristofini (French: Pierre Simon Cristofini), was a Corsican soldier who commanded the Phalange Africaine during the Tunisia Campaign of World War II. He was executed for treason by French authorities due to his support for Italian irredentism in Corsica during the Italian occupation of Corsica.

== Early life ==
Cristofini was born in Calenzana, in what is now Haute-Corse, on 26 May 1903. When 24 years old he married Marta Renucci.

== World War II ==
In 1939 became a Captain of the 3rd Algerian Tirailleurs Regiment. He was initially a supporter of Marshal Philippe Pétain.

Allied forces landed in French Morocco and Algeria in November 1942. Immediately, German and Italian reinforcements landed in French Tunisia and on 14 November the idea of an African Phalange was proposed in Paris with the support of the Third Reich Ambassador Otto Abetz. In December, German authorities approved the plan and 330 volunteers were recruited under the command of Cristofini. The troops trained at the Bordj-Ceda camp and a 210-man company, called Französische Freiwilligen Legion, was eventually incorporated into the 2nd Battalion, 754th Panzer Grenadier Regiment, part of the 5th Panzerarmee.

In Tunisia Cristofini was wounded in one eye. Before returning to Corsica he met Benito Mussolini in Rome.

Colonel Cristofini was a supporter of the union of Corsica with Italy and defended Italian irredentism ideals. He actively collaborated with Italian forces in Corsica during the first months of 1943 and worked with Petru Giovacchini, the possible governor of Corsica if the Axis had won the war. Cristofini, as head of the Vichy troops in Ajaccio helped the Italian Army to repress Resistance opposition in Corsica before the Italian Armistice in September 1943.

He was put on trial for treason after the Allies retook Corsica, and sentenced to death. He tried to kill himself, and was executed while suffering from his wounds in November 1943.

== After World War II ==
His wife, Marta Renucci, was sentenced to 15 years of jail in Algiers in 1946 for supporting irredentism and for collaborating with Italian fascism, but served only a reduced sentence.

== Bibliography ==
- Il Martirio di un irredento: il colonnello Petru Simone Cristofini. Rivista Storia Verità, n.11, 1998.

== See also ==
- Italian-occupied Corsica
- Phalange Africaine
