= Léo Battesti =

Corsican chess enthusiast and former politician and militant (born 1953)

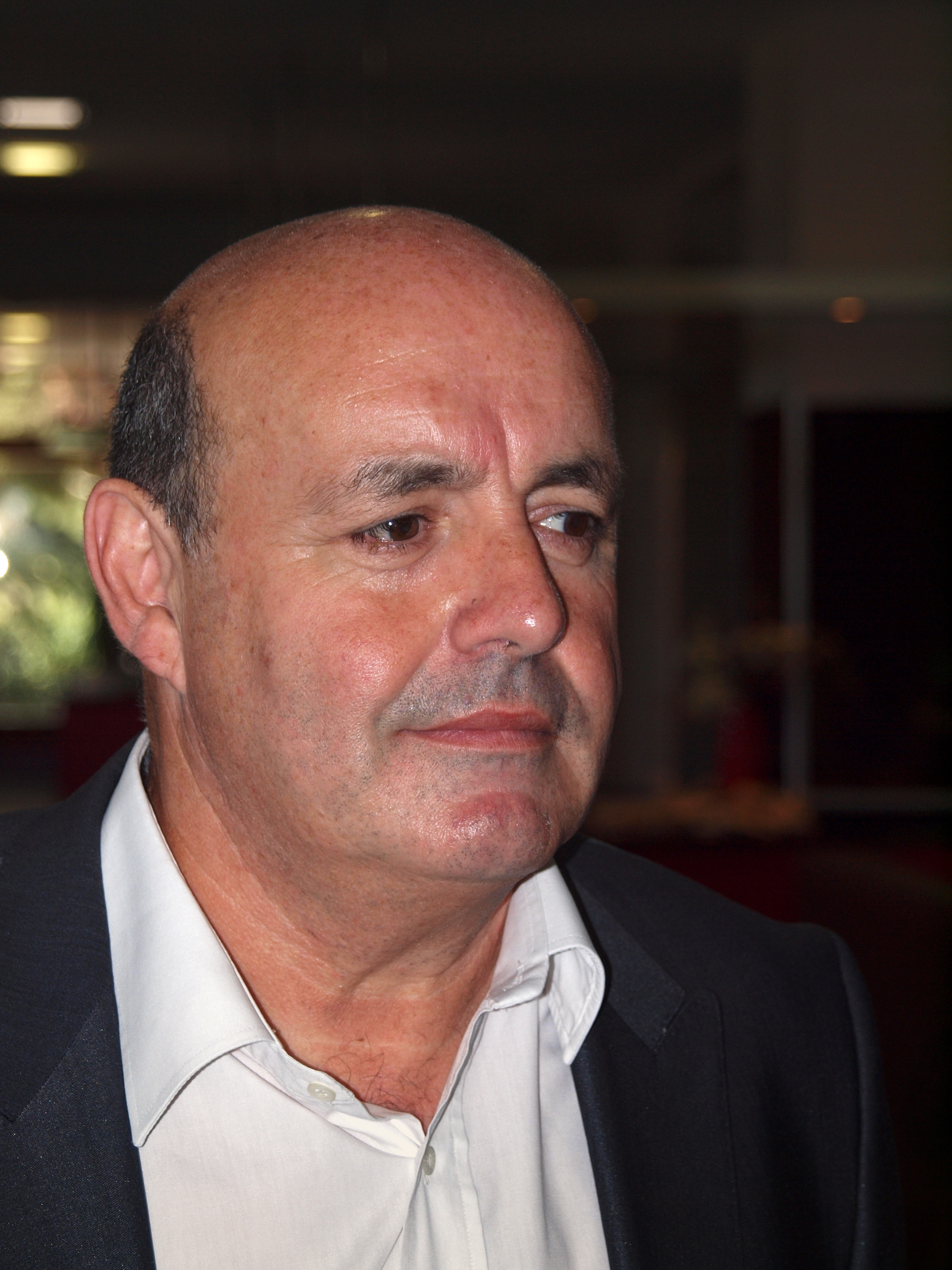
- Battesti in 2012

Vice-President of the French Chess Federation
- Incumbent
- Assumed office January 2005
- President: Éloi Relange

Member of the Corsican Assembly
- In office 16 March 1986 – 14 October 1992

Personal details
- Born: 6 November 1953 (age 72) Bastia, Corsica, France
- Party: Muvimentu Corsu per l'Autodeterminazione (MCA) (1983-1988); A Cuncolta Naziunalista (1988-1990); Muvimentu per l'Autodeterminazione (MPA) (1990-1992)

Military service
- Allegiance: National Liberation Front of Corsica (1976-1990); FLNC-Canal Habituel (1990-1992)
- Years of service: 1975–1992
- Battles/wars: Corsican conflict

Léo Battesti (born 6 November 1953) is a Corsican chess enthusiast, activist, and retired politician and militant.

== Early life ==
Léo Battesti was born on 6 November 1953 in Bastia to parents from the town of Venaco, near Corte. He earned a Master of Law at Université Paris-Sorbonne.

== Beginnings of activism ==
Battesti began his activism from University, chairing the Sorbonne chapter of the Cunsulta di i Studenti Corsi (CSC), a Corsican nationalist student group. This got him in contact with numerous other Corsican nationalist students in the Paris and Nice regions, including a young Alain Orsoni. The two created a close bond with one another and began organizing more radical actions and demonstrations in the name of Corsican separatism. In the summer of 1975, Battesti and Orsoni would return to Corsica and join the Corsican Regionalist Action (Azione Regiunalista Corsa, ARC), a separatist paramilitary organization. It was in this group that Battesti and Orsoni participated in the Aleria standoff, an armed engagement between the ARC and French security forces which resulted in the death of two gendarmes. Battesti maintains he did not fire any shots during the conflict. A year after this standoff and the rising tensions that followed, the National Liberation Front of Corsica (Fronte di Liberazione Naziunale di a Corsica, FLNC) was formed. Battesti, along with many other ARC members disillusioned with the ARC's position on autonomy before independence, joined the organization and quickly rose through its ranks.

== In the FLNC ==
Battesti was an important member of the FLNC from its foundation, serving as a member of the Direzione from Bastia. in May 1978, twenty-four militants were arrested after a plot to bomb the national tax office of Haute-Corse was foiled. Battesti was arrested and considered the main architect of this plan. He was held in La Santé Prison. It was here that Battesti gained a fascination for chess after hearing two imprisoned KGB spies play chess in morse code. Battesti bought a chess board soon after and began playing chess with other Corsicans, as well as Breton, Basque, and Russian prisoners imprisoned in La Santé. Battesti was pardoned by president François Mitterrand as part of the "Defferre accords", a failed attempt to make peace in Corsica. Battesti returned to Bastia and began organizing again, becoming a member of the Cunsigliu in the FLNC.

He worked as a journalist from 1981 to 1992, chief Editor of a Corsican weekly.

In 1983, Battesti participated in the creation of the Corsican Movement for Self-Determination (Muvimentu Corsu per l'Autodeterminazione, MCA), and was appointed general secretary of the party. Battesti was elected to the Corsican assembly in the March 1986 election as a member of the party, the political wing of the FLNC. This election was annulled in Haute-Corse in early 1987 following widespread fraud allegations, but Battesti won his seat in the 1987 re-election. Battesti became president of the sports and culture commission within the Corsican Assembly in 1990.

== "Years of Lead" and divorce from armed insurgency ==
In May 1988, the FLNC declared a controversial ceasefire to reopen negotiations with Mitterrand following his re-election. This caused the organization to be divided amongst the "Historiques", who wanted to continue war with the government, and "Habituels", who wanted to negotiate for independence or autonomy with the French government. Historiques were mostly common soldiers in the FLNC or radical brigade leaders and generals, while Habituels, like Battesti, were mostly people in leadership positions or people in non-combat roles. Battesti urged negotiation with the government during what is called the "Joxe Accords". In 1990, the Historique brigades which had left the FLNC created the FLNC-Canal Historique (Canale Storicu, FLNC-CS), and the remaining Habituels, rallied around Alain Orsoni, created the FLNC-Canal Habituel (Canale Abituale, FLNC-CA). Battesti led a faction of the FLNC-CA and its political wing, the Movement for Self-Determination (Muvimentu per l'Autodeterminazione, MPA) which pushed for total disarmament and an end to the Corsican conflict through negotiations. Orsoni eventually broke the 1988 ceasefire and the FLNC-CA began open war again, though Orsoni and other generals were mostly focused on fighting the FLNC-CS. This caused a rift between Battesti and Orsoni, formerly close allies, and on 14 October 1992 Battesti resigned from the FLNC-CA, MPA, and all political positions, including his seat in the Corsican Assembly. Battesti would use his public image to repeatedly denounce nationalist infighting during the so-called "Years of Lead", an intense period of civil war between the Habituels and the Historiques.

== Chess ==
He is vice-president of French Chess Federation since January 2005, in charge of communication and thus, chief-editor of the quarterly "Échec & Mat".
