= A Muvra =

Far-right Corsican nationalist newspaper

A Muvra (English: The Mouflon) was a far-right Corsican nationalist newspaper from the years 1920 to 1939.

== History ==
Petru Rocca published the magazine A Muvra ("The Mouflon") from May 15, 1920, with other Corsican veterans of the French army in Paris. Shortly after, the headquarters of the foundation was transferred to Cours Grandval, 38 in Ajaccio . He created in late 1922 or early 1923 the Corsican Action Party on the model of the Sardinian Action Party.

It was said that A Muvra was the heir to A Tramuntana by Santu Casanova, "repatriated" the following year to Ajaccio, the newspaper would appear without interruption until 1939. The muvrists were so numerous that in the mid-1920s, they published cultural journals like A baretta Misgia, Ghjuventù or Almànaccio di a muvra, without forgetting the theater troupe directed by the Notinis.

Around the Rocca brothers, Petru and Matteu, the members of the editorial staff were mainly Santu Casanova, Hyacinthe Yvia-Croce, Orsini d'Ampugnani, the young Marc Angeli. They were mainly mature men, from the intellectual petty bourgeoisie, often Italophiles, politically conservative, but also reactionary and attached to an exclusively ethnic vision of the nation.

The periodical became the organ of the Partitu Corsu d'Azione from 1922 to 1927 and of the Partitu Corsu Autonomistu from 1927 to 1939, thus becoming the "voice" of the Italianizing corsists.

A Muvra, as a propaganda periodical, used caricature as a political weapon: in nineteen years, the magazine published about 500 caricatures, marked by only twenty-one different signatures, corresponding to five different cartoonists. Among them, Matteu Rocca, Petru's brother, is the author of more than 300 drawings.

In 1925, the periodical's printing house published the Corsican translation of Don Quixote.

In 1939 the periodical was closed by the French authorities and in 1945 the former director Petru Rocca was sentenced to 15 years in prison for collaboration with Fascist Italy.

== Ideology ==
A Muvra's ideology has evolved over time. For nearly 15 years, A Muvra has defended an autonomist, identity-based and ethnic nationalist line.

Over time, A Muvra became increasingly Italianate and from 1935 officially supported Italian irredentism, from 1938 A Muvra adopted an anti-Semitic and anti-Freemasonry stance.

== Funding ==
A Muvra was financed by François Coty between 1921 and 1923.

== Editorial staff ==
- Petru Rocca
- Matteu Rocca
- Paulu Orsoni †
- Petru Giovacchini
- Santu Casanova
- Tumasgiu Alfonsi
- Simon Dary
- Dumenicu Carlotti
- Hyacinthe Yvia-Croce
- Marco Angeli di Sartena

== Bibliography ==
- Autonomistes corses et irrédentisme fasciste 1920-1939, Jean-Pierre Poli, DCL éditions 2007
- Vingt années de corsisme, 1920-1939, Hyacinthe Yvia-Croce, Éditions Cyrnos et Méditerranée, Ajaccio, 1979.
- A Muvra, Pierre Rocca (dir.), Ajaccio, numéro 447, 15 août-1er septembre 1931
