= List of armed factions in the Corsican conflict =

Throughout the Corsican conflict, there were a large number of paramilitary and guerrilla organizations that formed, both to combat French rule and support it. Many of these groups had feuds with other irregular formations, and waged small conflicts between themselves, along with the French government. The name “National Liberation Front of Corsica” (Corsican: Fronte di Liberazione Naziunale di a Corsica, FLNC) is used by many Corsican nationalist formations to claim the legacy of the original FLNC, an organization that led a guerrilla war against the French from 1976 to 1988, similar to Irish Republican Army splits. This list will be divided into time periods to better organize information. This list will provide both native Corsican or French names and their English translations.

== 1959–1976: Pre-FLNC ==
Before the FLNC formed, many armed groups were already leading small-scale insurgencies across Corsica. Many formed in protest of the pied-noirs, who were buying up the only arable land from Corsica while fleeing the Algerian war, and many regionalists were fighting for Corsican representation as a French region (Corsica was part of Provence-Alpes-Côté d’Azur until 1975).

Name	Native Name	Abbreviation	Dates of Operation	Ideology	Notes
Movement of 29 November	Muvimentu di u 29 Nuvembri	M29N	29 November 1959 – 27 October 1963	Communist	Separatist.
Committee of Action and Promotion of Corsica	Cumitatu d’Azzione è Prumuzione di a Corsica	CAPCO	27 October 1963-May 1967	Communist	Direct descendant of the M29N, formed through a reorganization of the M29N.
Corsican Committee for Independence	Comitatu Corsu Per l’Indipendenza	CCI	1961-1963	Far-right	Separatist. Contacted Pied-Noir terrorists and signed agreements with the OAS.
Corsican Union for the Future	Unione Corsa - L’Avvene	UC-A	Late 1964-31 July 1966	Far-left	Regionalist.
Committee of Students for the Defense and Interests of Corsica	Cumitatu di Studenti per a Difesa è Interessi di a Corsica	CEDIC	April 1964-31 July 1966	Right-wing	Regionalist.
Corsican Regionalist Front	Fronte Regiunalista Corsa	FRC	31 July 1966-July 1973	No specific ideology until ARC split; Left-wing from September 1967 onwards	Regionalist.
Corsican Regionalist Action	Azzione Regiunalista Corsa	ARC	September 1967-July 1973	Right-wing	Regionalist. Former CEDIC members who split from the FRC in September 1967 due to ideological disagreements with the former members of the UC-A.
Action for the Corsican Rebirth	Azzione per la Rinascita Corsa	ARC	July 1973-February 1976	No specific ideology	Autonomist. Renaming and reorganization of the ARC; led the Aleria Standoff in August 1975.
Association of Corsican Patriots	Associu di i Patriotti Corsi	APC	February 1976-31 July 1977	No specific ideology	Renaming of the ARC to avoid police detection; dissolved to become a political party (the UPC) in 1977.
Free Corsica	Corsica Libera	CL	Late 1967/Early 1968-late 1968	No specific ideology; anti-gaullist	Separatist. Not to be confused with Corsica Libera (2008–present), the political wing of the FLNC-UC.
Corsican Peasant Front for Liberation	Fronte Paesanu Corsu per Liberazione	FPCL	15 September 1973 – 5 May 1976	Communist	Separatist. Declared an illegal militia on 30 January 1974.
Paolina Justice	Ghjustizia Paolina	GP	22 March 1974 – 5 May 1976	Far-Left	Separatist. Named after leader of the Corsican Republic Pasquale Paoli.
Justice of Sampiero	Justice de Sampiero	JS	May 1974-6 April 1977	Far-right	Anti-Separatist. Named after Sampiero Corso.
Corsican Justice	Ghjustizia Corsa	GC	November 1974-September 1975	Unknown	Separatist.
Justice and Liberty	Justice et Liberté, Ghjustizia è Libertà	JL	September 1975-6 April 1977	Far-right	Anti-Separatist. Largest anti-separatist organization before the formation of FRANCIA.
Corsican Revolutionary Front	Fronte Rivuluzionariu Corsu	FRC	September–October 1975	Unknown	Separatist.
Corsican Revolutionary Commandos	Commando Rivuluzionarii Corsi	CRC	September–December 1975	Unknown	Separatist.
Corsican Anti-Italian Front	Front Corse Anti-Italiens	FCAI	October 1975-July 1976	Far-right	Anti-Separatist. Unknown if the name refers to Italians in general or if it refers to Corsicans as Italians.
Morandine Justice	Justice Morandine/Ghjustizia Morandina	JM/GM	November–December 1975	Unknown	Anti-Separatist. Named after General Morand, a Napoleonic general placed in charge of suppressing revolts in Corsica in the early 1800s.
Anti-Italian League	Ligue Anti-Italien	LAI	January–February 1976	Far-right	Anti-Separatist. The same naming situation as the FCAI.

== 1976–1988: FLNC guerrilla war ==
The 12-year period of large-scale FLNC activity only involved a limited number of groups due to the FLNC being a strong and uniting force. This would end with a ceasefire that broke the FLNC and an era of factionalism in the 1990s.

Name	Native Name	Abbreviation/Common name	Dates of Operation	Ideology	Notes
National Liberation Front of Corsica	Fronte di Liberazione Naziunale di a Corsica	FLNC	5 May 1976 – 17 October 1990	Far-left	Separatist. Largest and most famous group in the Corsican conflict. Waged a guerrilla war for 12 years. The FLNC went on ceasefire after François Mitterrand won reelection, causing anti-ceasefire activists to leave and break apart the organization.
Free France-Corsica	France-Corse Libre	FCL	October–November 1976	Unknown	Anti-Separatist.
New Action Front against Independence and Autonomy	Front d’Action Nouvelle Contre l’Indépendance et l’Autonomie	FRANCIA	6 April 1977-Late 1983	Far-right	Largest anti-separatist group in the Corsican conflict. Operated with French military support.
Corsican Revolutionary Brigade	Brigata Rivuluzionaria Corsa	BRC	January 1983 – 1986	No specific ideology	Local to the Grand Ajaccio area.

== 1989–2001: Factionalism and the Years of Lead ==
In 1988, after the ceasefire with Mitterrand broke apart the FLNC, many groups began to rise from the original FLNC and claim to be the legitimate successors of the organization. This era begins the widespread use of “National Liberation Front of Corsica” being used in separate group names to claim heritage.

Name	Native Name	Abbreviation/Common name	Dates of Operation	Ideology	Notes
Resistance	Resistenza	Resistenza	24 October 1989-May 2003 (On ceasefire from June 1996)	Far-left	Separatist; first split of the FLNC. Despite being anti-ceasefire, Resistenza allied with the pro-ceasefire FLNC-CA for two years to oppose the hypermilitarism of the FLNC-CS. Switched sides in 1992. Denounced violence and went on permanent ceasefire until their self-dissolution in 2003.
The Punishment	U Castigu	U Castigu	17 May–June 1990	Unknown	Anti-Separatist. Local to Porticcio. Dismantled by FLNC militants.
National Liberation Army of Corsica	Armata di Liberazione Naziunale di a Corsica	ALNC	August–November 1990	Far-left	Separatist. Split from the FLNC. Rejoined the FLNC after a brief guerrilla campaign based around the town of Corte.
National Liberation Front of Corsica-Habitual Channel	Fronte di Liberazione Naziunale di a Corsica-Canale Abituale	Canal Habituel, FLNC-CA	17 October 1990 – 27 January 1997 (On ceasefire since 4 May 1996)	No specific ideology	Autonomist. Formed from the remnants of the pro-ceasefire sector of the FLNC. Mostly friendly to France throughout its existence, going to war with the FLNC-CS. Announced a ceasefire and internal collapse in 1996, self-dissolved in 1997.
National Liberation Front of Corsica-Historic Channel	Fronte di Liberazione Naziunale di a Corsica-Canale Storicu	Canal Historique, FLNC-CS	25 November 1990 – 23 December 1999	Far-left	Separatist. De facto existed through FLNC dissidents as early as September 1988. Largest FLNC split; anti-ceasefire. Known for radical militancy and hard-hitting attacks. War with the FLNC-CA lasted until 1996, FLNC-CA dissolution occurred a year later. War with an FLNC-CS split, Armata Corsa, caused unification with other groups to form the FLNC-UC.
Enough Drugs	A Droga Basta	ADB	November 1990-December 1995	No specific ideology	Separatist. Largely an anti-drug dealer/anti-mafia group, ADB had connections to the FLNC-CS throughout its existence.
Independence	Indipendenza	Indipendenza	December 1992-January 1993	Unknown	Separatist. Local to Ajaccio.
Corsican Armed Revolutionary Front	Fronte Armatu Rivuluzionariu Corsu	FARC	8 January 1993 – 9 December 2005	No specific ideology	Separatist. Along with another armed group, the APC, the FARC declared a “provisional government” of the Corsican Republic in 2006.
Corsican Justice	Ghjustizia Corsa	GC	17 September 1993 – 1994(?)	Unknown	Separstist. Only a few known actions, including an attack on France3's Ajaccio headquarters.
Rebel Front	Fronte Ribellu	Fronte Ribellu, FR	5 December 1995 – 23 December 1999	Far-left	Split of the FLNC-CS. Split over the FLNC-CS's approach of war with the FLNC-CA before war with the government. Despite this, Fronte Ribellu found itself in a factional war with the FLNC-CS until 1999. Formed the FLNC-UC with other groups in December 1999.
National Liberation Front of Corsica-5 May	Fronte di Liberazione Naziunale di a Corsica-5 Maghju	FLNC-5M	5 May 1996 – 23 December 1999	Far-left	Separatist. Split from the FLNC-CA after the organization announced an “imminent end to armed struggle”. Continued the fight with the FLNC-CS. Formed the FLNC-UC with other groups in 1999.
Sampiero	Sampieru	Sampieru	15 September 1997 – 1998	Unknown	Likely separatist. Committed 2 bombings in Pietrosella and one in Strasbourg. Only ever released one press conference.
Corsican University	Università Corsa	Università Corsa	October–November 1997	Unknown	Separatist. Targeted professors at the University of Corsica Pasquale Paoli.
Corsican Army	Armata Corsa	AC	25 June 1999-September 2001	Far-left	Split from the FLNC-CS, when southern division leader François Santoni and Balagne brigade leader Jean-Michel Rossi left the organization due to personal quarrels. The organization went to war with every other nationalist armed group present on the island at the time, which caused them all to unite against the AC and form the FLNC-UC. Disbanded a month after Santoni was shot to death by a mafioso.
Corsican Patriot Front	Fronte Patriottu Corsu	FPC	8 October 1999-August 2000	Unknown	Separatist. Unlike many groups, the FPC began discussions with the state to secure autonomy agreements. Self-dissolved in August 2000.
Clandestine	Clandestinu	Clandestinu	25 November-23 December 1999	No specific ideology	Separatist. Only existed for a month before founding the FLNC-UC with other organizations.
National Liberation Front of Corsica-Union of Combattants	Fronte di Liberazione Naziunale di a Corsica-Unione di i Cumbattenti	FLNC-UC	23 December 1999 – present (disarmed from June 2014 to 21 March 2023)	Far-left	Separatist. Largest FLNC group since the original. Originally by the FLNC-CS, FLNC-5M, Fronte Ribellu, and Clandestinu to combat Armata Corsa, but continued to operate as a united front against the French government after Armata Corsa's dissolution. Operated a harsh guerrilla campaign until June 2014, when it disarmed to allow a political solution. Rearmed a year after the death of Yvan Colonna, and has since committed a number of attacks, although not nearly to the pace of the pre-2014 organization.
Corsican Republican Army	Armata Republicana Corsa	ARC	2 August 2000 – 2001	Unknown	Separatist.
National Liberation Front of Corsica of the Anonymous	Fronte di Liberazione Naziunale di a Corsica di i Anonimi	FLNC-A	6 July 2001-September 2002	Far-left	Separatist. Proxy group of the FLNC-UC. Dissolved (likely joined the FLNC-UC) in September 2002.

== 2001–2006: FLNC-22U, small separatist organizations, and anti-Muslim organizations ==
After the September 11th attacks increased paranoia of Islamist movements attacking Corsica drove many small, far-right armed groups to form to drive Muslims out of Corsica through intimidation and armed attack. These groups were notably opposed by the FLNC, who feuded with some of them. At the same time, the FLNC-UC was going through a period of instability when many members founded a rival group, the FLNC-22 of October (FLNC-22U).

Name	Native Name	Abbreviation	Dates of Operation	Ideology	Notes
Corsican Secret Organization	Organisazione Sicreta Corsa	OSC	April 2002 – 2006	Far-right	Anti-Arab. The Name “Secret Organization” is likely a reference to the OAS. Local to the Balagne region.
Corsican Christian Army	Armata Cristiana Corsa	ACC	August 2002 – 2006	Far-right	Anti-Muslim. Local to the Ajaccio area.
National Liberation Army	Armata di Liberazione Naziunale	ALN	2 August 2002 – 22 October 2002	Unknown	Separatist. Claimed a series of Gendarmerie bombings across Corsica. Likely joined with FLNC-UC dissidents in October 2002 to form the FLNC-22U.
National Liberation Front of Corsica-22 October	Fronte di Liberazione Naziunale di a Corsica-22 Uttrovi	FLNC-22U	22 October 2002 – Present	Far-left	Separatist. Second-largest currently existing Corsican nationalist armed group, behind the FLNC-UC. Formed from an FLNC-UC split due to differing views on how to handle armed struggle (as well as an ALN unification), the FLNC-UC and FLNC-22U would feud for most of their early existence. In 2016, the FLNC-22U went on ceasefire. Since 2023, when ceasefire was broken, the FLNC-22U and FLNC-UC have worked closely together.
Corsican Resistance	Resistenza Corsa	RC	29 December 2002 – 13 August 2003	Far-right	Anti-Muslim. Local to the Bastia region. Faced with “disarmament or dissolution” by the FLNC-UC, the group joined as its 5th army faction in 2003, where its anti-Muslim ideals were rejected.
Clandestines Against Drugs	Clandestini Contra a Droga	CCD	August 2004 – 2006	Far-right	Anti-Muslim. Carried out a series of attacks against Muslims in Ajaccio and Bastia.
Corsican Clandestines	Clandestini Corsi	CC	17 March-8 September 2004	Far-right	Anti-Muslim. Carried out some of the most violent attacks against Muslims in Corsica. Dissolved after the FLNC-UC threatened them with “physical liquidation” through violent means.
Anonymous Clandestine Movement	Muvimentu Clandestini Anonimu	MCA	July 2004 – 2006	Far-right	Anti-Muslim.
Army of the Corsican People	Armata di u Populu Corsu	APC	May 2004-9 October 2006	Far-left	Separatist. Declared a “Provisional Government of the Corsican Republic” with the FARC in 2006, who joins their organization the same year. dissolves after police arrest many higher-ups in the organization.

== 2006–2014: FLNC legitimism ==
From 2006 onwards, many splinters begin to declare their own groups with the name “FLNC”, in an attempt to claim the identity of the original FLNC.

Name	Native Name	Abbreviation	Dates of Operation	Ideology	Notes
National Liberation Front of Corsica-the One and Only	Fronte di Liberazione Naziunale di a Corsica-u Solu è Unicu	FLNC-SU	23 July 2006 – 2007	Unknown	Separatist. Local to the Balagne region.
Rebel Clandestines	Clandsestini Ribelli	CR	14 August–September 2006	Unknown	Separatist. Claimed an attack on the Corsican Assembly building in Ajaccio and is suspected of another attack in Calvi.
National Liberation Front of Corsica-5 May 1976	Fronte di Liberazione Naziunale di a Corsica-5 Maghju 1976	FLNC-1976	5 May 2008 – Present	No specific ideology	Separatist. Mainly local to the south of the island.
Unified National Liberation Front of Corsica	Fronte di Liberazione Naziunale di a Corsica Unificatu	FLNC-U	8 August 2009 – 2012	No specific ideology	Separatist. Committed a large series of attacks until its self-dissolution in 2012.
National Liberation Front of Corsica-9 July	Fronte di Liberazione Naziunale di a Corsica—9 Lugliu	FLNC-9L	9 July 2012 – 2013	Unknown	Small organization local to the Bastia area.

== 2014–present: Cessation of hostilities, Yvan Colonna, and re-escalation ==
After the FLNC-UC agreement in 2014, and the FLNC-22U agreement in 2016, violence was quelled significantly, however violence was intermittent through small groups. In March 2022, the 2022 Corsica Unrest saw the formation of new armed groups, and the Corsican Conflict picked up again.

Name	Native Name	Abbreviation	Dates of Operation	Ideology	Notes
National Liberation Front of Corsica-Rebirth	Fronte di Liberazione Naziunale di a Corsica-Rinascita	FLNC-R	February 2017-March 2023	Unknown	Separatist. Likely responsible for a number of bomb attacks throughout the peace period.
National Liberation Front of Corsica-21 May	Fronte di Liberazione Naziunale di a Corsica-21 Maghju	FLNC-21M	21 May 2021 – present	Unknown	Separatist. Attributed to only a few attacks. Local to the Cap Corse region.
Youth Action for the Rebirth of Corsica	Azzione Ghjuventù per la Rinascita Corsa	AGRC, AJRC (from the French acronym)	7 April 2022 – Present	Far-left	Separatist. First group to form after the death of Yvan Colonna. Local to the southern area of Corsica.
Corsican Clandestine Youth	Ghjuventù Clandestina Corsa	GCC	4 August 2022 – 19 February 2024	Far-left	Separatist. Committed a series of actions across Corsica after the death of Yvan Colonna. Dismantled by police in February 2024 when three leaders of the group were arrested.
