= Petru Giovacchini =

Italian politician

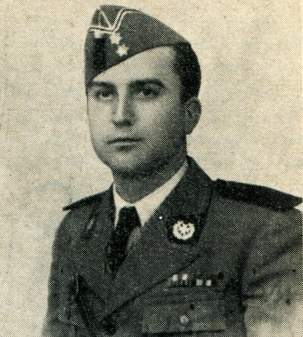
Giovacchini Petru in 1938

Petru Giovacchini (French: Pierre Giovacchini, Italian: Pietro Giovacchini; 1 February 1910 – 29 September 1955) was a Corsican activist, born in Canale-di-Verde to an old family of the Corsican nobility with deep-rooted pro-Italian feelings. Giovacchini was the most renowned of the Corsican Italians, who actively promoted the unification of Corsica to the Kingdom of Italy during the Fascist years.

== Life ==
Since young he collaborated with writings to the literary newspaper A Muvra. In 1927, he was expelled from the "Liceo National" of Bastia and founded the pro-Italian magazine "Primavera", where he published the poems "Musa canalinca" and "Rime notturne". Giovacchini was disappointed with the moderate positions of the Movimento Autonomista Corso and decided to move to Italy in 1930 to study medicine at Pisa University.

In Italy, Giovacchini came in contact with the Italian irredentism movement and, because of this, was harshly attacked by the French authorities when he returned to Corsica. One of the main accusations he received was that he considered Pasquale Paoli (the hero of Corsica) as the precursor of the Corsican irredentism in favour of the unification of the island with Italy.

He escaped to Italy and in November 1933, founded in Pavia the famous "Gruppi di Cultura Corsa", with Corsican university students in Italy. In 1936, Giovacchini got his degree and, as a member of the Fascist Party, he quickly volunteered to fight in Ethiopia and successively in Spain, where he was wounded and got the "bronze" medal of honour.

In June 1940, Giovacchini organised hundreds of manifestations in many cities of Italy in order to request Corsica's unification with Italy. Because of this, he was elected to represent Corsica in the Italian Fascist Parliament in 1942. When Italy occupied Corsica in November 1942, Giovacchini was named as the possible Governor of Corsica if the Kingdom of Italy were to annexe the island of Corsica. He worked with colonel Petru Simone Cristofini to make the Corsican population accept the Italian occupation of Corsica (and later a possible union with Italy).

After the Italian armistice in September 1943, Giovacchini was forced to hide until 1945. Prosecuted by a French tribunal in Corsica, he received a death sentence in 1945 and so went into exile to Canterano (near Rome).

In September 1955, Giovacchini died, as a consequence of former combat wounds, and since his death, he is considered one of the most famous Corsican Italians of the Italian Irredentism era.

== Works ==
The literary works of Petru Giovacchini were:

- Musa Canalinca (1929)
- Rime notturne (1930)
- Aurore, poesie corse (1936)
- Corsica Nostra (1942)
- Archiatri pontifici corsi (1951)

The Corsican Italians who promoted the ideal of Corsican irredentism published mainly in Italy, because of the persecution from the French regime on the island. This was the case of Petru Giovacchini, who (after his initial poems Musa canalinca and Rime notturne, done when young) wrote his main literary works in Italy.

Indeed, he wrote Aurore, poesie corse in 1936 in Livorno, followed by Corsica nostra and the Archiatri pontifici corsi in 1942 and 1951 in Rome (the last, just a few years before his premature death).

== Bibliography ==
- Mastroserio, Giuseppe. Petru Giovacchini – Un Patriota esule in Patria. Editrice Proto. Bari, 2004.
- Vignoli, Giulio. Gli Italiani Dimenticati Ed. Giuffè. Roma, 2000
- Vita e Tragedia dell'Irredentismo Corso, Rivista Storia Verità, n.4, 1997

== See also ==
- Italia irredenta
- Corsican Italians
- Italian-occupied Corsica
- Simon Petru Cristofini
- Pietro Rocca
