= Légion impériale =

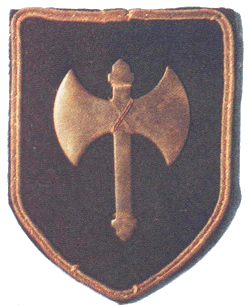
- Symbol of the Phalange Africaine
- Active: November 1942 – May 1943
- Country: Vichy France
- Type: c.400-450
- Size: Battalion
- Part of: 754th Panzergrenadier Regiment
- Nickname(s): Französische Freiwilligen Legion or Compagnie Frankonia
- Engagements: World War II: North African Campaign; Tunisian Campaign

Commanders
- Notable commanders: Simon Petru Cristofini

The Légion impériale was a military unit created by the Vichy French government in November 1942, with the support of Nazi Ambassador Otto Abetz, to oppose the Allies, who had invaded North Africa in order to drive the Axis out. In April 1943 it was renamed Légion des Volontaires Français de Tunisie (Legion of French Volunteers of Tunisia), and it went into captivity upon the Axis surrender in Africa in May.

== Organization ==
They were only able to raise a single weak battalion for the Legion, called the Phalange Africaine (African phalanx). It consisted of 400-450 men.

The volunteer unit was formed to fight alongside the retreating Axis troops.

== Commanding officers ==
The battalion was commanded by Colonel Simon Petru Cristofini.

== Operational history ==
In the spring of 1943 it fought along with the remnants of the German 334th Infantry Division.

== See also ==
- Operation Torch, North African Campaign
- Vichy France
