= Pietro Rocca =

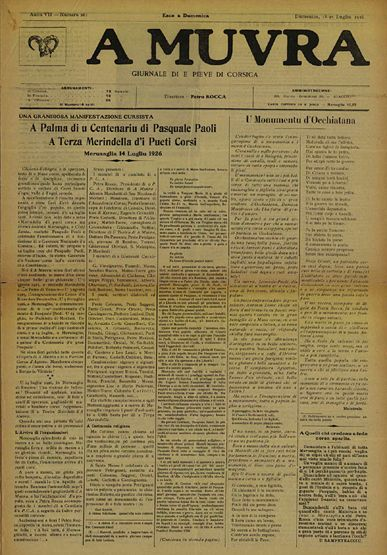
"A Muvra", Petru Rocca's literary review

Petru Rocca (French: Pierre Rocca, Italian: Pietro Rocca; Vico, 1887 - Vico, 1966) was a Corsican politician and writer who supported Corsican independence from France. Initially he advocated regionalism for Corsica within the French state. He briefly supported Italian irredentism in Corsica, before returning to a position of French-Corsican regionalism before World War II.

== Early life ==
Pietro (Petru in Corsican) Rocca was a printer by trade, and before 1914 contributed to the original Corsican cultural magazine A Tramuntana. Called up for military action in World War I he was wounded on multiple occasions and wrote about his wartime experiences. In recognition of his service he was decorated with the French Legion of Honor.

Corsica, like France's other heavily agricultural regions, was heavily affected by the casualties of the war. Rocca returned to Ajaccio and, with other combat veterans disillusioned in the French state and nation, founded the Corsican literary magazine A Muvra (the Muflon). This journal offered a home to a range of Corsican political projects, ranging from simple decentralisation within France, to an independent state, to merging into the Italian state. Differing political contexts during the interwar would lead to each of the currents gaining popularity at different times.

A Muvra led to the formation of the first Corsican regionalist party, the Partitu Corsu d'Azione (1922 to 1926), modelled on the Sardinian regionalist party in Italy, the Partito Sardo d'Azione. Rocca highlighted the successful examples of other national movements in Europe: Home Rule and Sinn Féin in Ireland; the Mancomunitat and Generalitat in Catalonia, and the ongoing efforts of the Breton nationalist movement Breizh Atao in France.

But between 1925 and 1928, in the context of the Alsatian regionalist crisis, the French state adopted a severe stance towards regionalism. Petru Rocca and many of the PCA began to doubt the French state's goodwill towards self-rule for regional nationalities. He affirmed France to be a state formed by multiple nationalities - Alsatian, Basque, Breton, Catalan and Flemish, as well as Corsican - and demanded that these be granted regional self-rule within a multi-national French state. Petru Roccia therefore represented Corsica when, in 1926, the various regiona-national movements of France founded an umbrella association to coordinate their efforts, the Central Committee for the National Minorities of France.

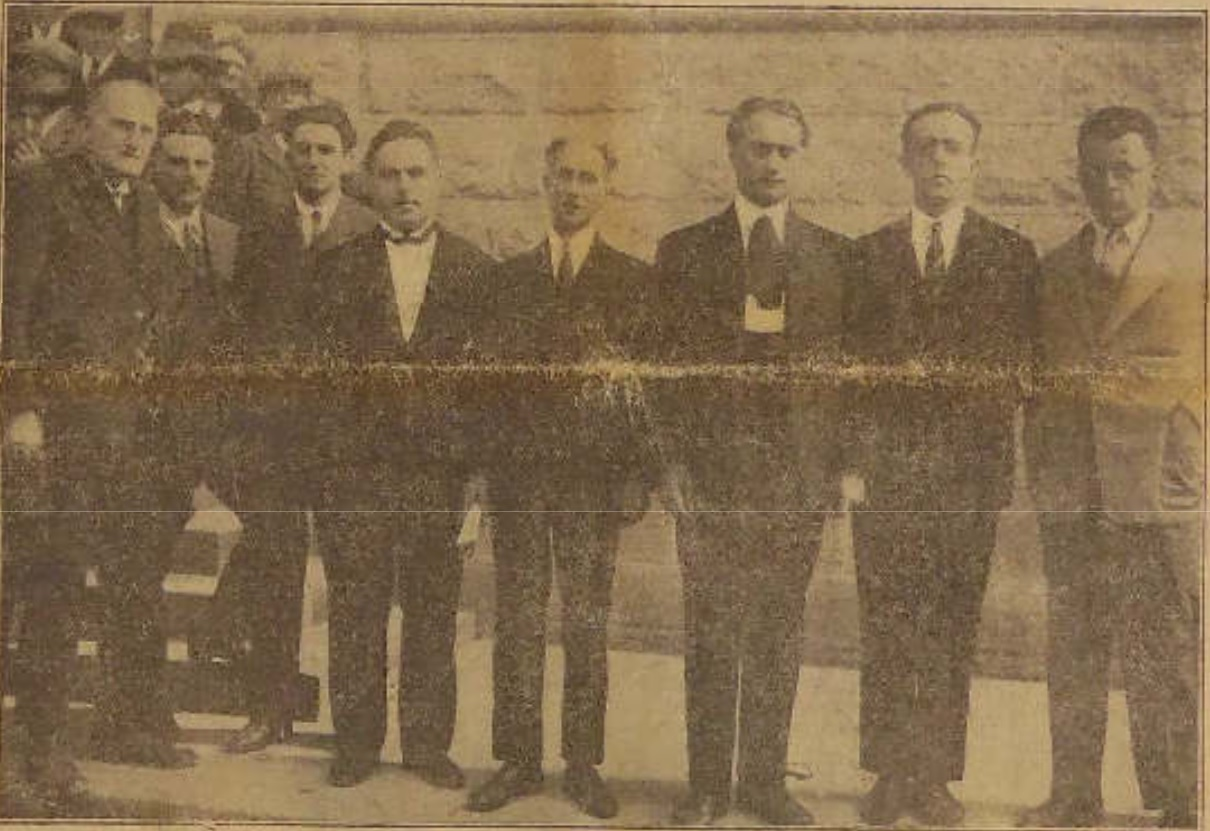
Paul Rocca (fourth from left) in 1928

In 1927 Rocca set up a more hardline party, the Partitu autonomista di Corsica, backed by monsignor Domenico Parlotti and Dr. Croce, director of the Archivi di Stato della Corsica.

== The 1930s and Second World War ==
During the late 1930s the crisis of the French state prompted many of the leaders of France's interwar national movements to slowly evolve from regionalism (greater self-rule within the French Republic) to separatism or irridentism with a neighbouring state, often losing patience with the French state and openly accepting the patronage of Nazi Germany. This was the case for Olivier Mordrel in Brittany, l'abbé Gantois in French Flanders et Hermann Bickler, who together coordinated their efforts through the journal Peuples et frontières (1936 to 1938) - the Corsican perspective was provided by Rocca.

During this period, Rocca's opinions followed a similar path. From 1935 Rocca and A Muvra began to openly reject the idea that Corsica had a place within the French state, a position developed in contact with other Corsican intellectuals such as Petru Giovacchini, Marco Angeli di Sartèna, and Marta Renucci. The end result was Italian irredentism, the idea that Corsica (through its language and long historical connections) was a culturally-Italic nation and would be better off merging into the Kingdom of Italy. This position was actively encouraged by Mussolini, who wished to acquire territories from France with historically Italic culture such as Corsica, Nice and Savoy. But whereas Italian linguists, sponsored by the Fascist government, presented the Corsican language as a mere dialect of Italian (with the political undertone that Corsica 'belonged' to Italy), Rocca maintained that Corsican and Italian were two distinct languages descended from a common ancestor. He was thus suspicious of Mussolini's plans to absorb Corsica just as France had done, and by World War Two had lost enthusiasm for the idea of Corsican union with Italy.

In any event Rocca had attracted the suspicion of French police, which made little distinction between full Italian-Corsican irredentists and French-Corsican autonomists. In 1938 he was stripped of his Legion of Honour. Around this time A Muvra began to publish articles against Freemasons and Jews, whom Rocca held responsible for the French 'occupation' of Corsica. In 1939, as war with Germany and Italy approached, Rocca was arrested and his journal suspended for the crime of "threatening the authority of France in the territories under its control".

After the end of the world war and the foundation of the Fourth Republic, in 1946 Rocca was sentenced to 15 years of jail and sent to the forced labour camp on Devil's Island (French Guiana). When released, he quickly recreated his original Partitu Corsu Autonomista.

In 1953, Petru Rocca created an academy for the defense of the Corsican language and demanded that the French state officially recognise the Corsican people and language, and accede to the re-opening of the old university at Corte. Rocca remained a lifelong supporter of Corsican nationalism, a political movement that returned to the mainstream shortly after his death in 1966

== Works ==
- Les corses devant l’anthropologie, Gamber, 1913
- Pruverbii, massime è detti corsi, 1921
- A pignatta, cumedia di Plautu, 1924
- Storia popular di Corsica, 1930
- Una Vittoria Autonomista. L'Assemblea di i Stati Generali di Corsica, 1934
- Quaderni di u Cursismu, 1935
- Parlà d'Aghjacciu, puesii, 1955
- Tempi è tempi, 1963

== See also ==
- Corsican nationalism
- Italian irredentism
- Italian irredentism in Corsica
- Legion of Honour
- Petru Giovacchini
- Marta Renucci
- Marco Angeli di Sartèna
