= Pierre Davity =

Pierre Davity, or d'Avity, Sieur de Montmartin (1573–1635) was a French soldier and writer of compilations, today little known. His account of Senegal was plagiarised by Olfert Dapper in his Naukeurige beschrijvinge der Afrikaensche Eylanden (1668).

== Works ==
- Les estats, empires et principautez du monde (1614)
- Le Monde (1st ed. 1637; 2nd ed. 1643; 3rd ed. 1660)

== Bibliography ==
- Hair, P. E. H. (1974). "Barbot, Dapper, Davity: A Critique of Sources on Sierra Leone and Cape Mount". History in Africa. 1: 25–54. doi:10.2307/3171759.
- Gilbert, Allan H. (1919). "Pierre Davity: His "Geography" and Its Use by Milton". Geographical Review. 7: 323–338.
- Lacroix, André (1869). "Pierre Davity". Bulletin de la Société d'archéologie et de statistique de la Drôme. 4: 99–102. Archived from the original on 12 March 2024.
- Perrossier, Cyprien (1902). "Pierre Davity, géographe et bel esprit du xviie siècle". Bulletin de la Société d'archéologie et de statistique de la Drôme. 36: 199–209, 310–316, 438–441. Archived from the original on 12 March 2024.
- Thilmans, Guy (1971). "Le Sénégal dans l'oeuvre d'Olfried Dapper". Bulletin de l'Institut français d'Afrique noire. 33 (3): 508–563.
