= Santu Casanova =

Corsican poet (1850–1936)

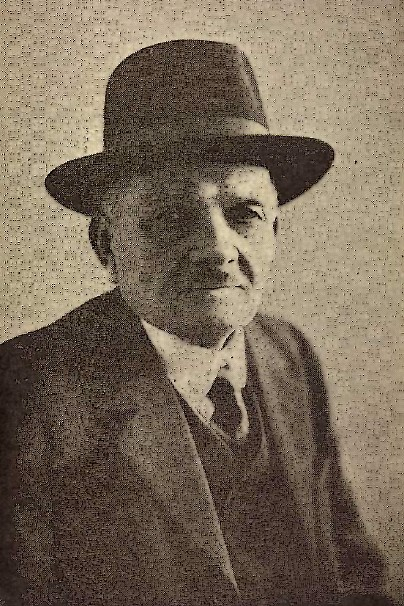
- Casanova in 1927
- Born: 3 July 1850; Azzana
- Died: 27 December 1936 (aged 86); Livorno, Italy
- Occupation: Poet

Santu Casanova (3 July 1850 – 27 December 1936) was a Corsican poet, originally from Riventosa on his father's side and Arbori on his mother's side. He was born on 3 July 1850 in Azzana and died in Livorno (Italy) on 27 December 1936. His ashes were transferred to Arbori in 1962.

== Biography ==
He was one of the first to the Corsican language from the Italian language, and to campaign for Corsican to be considered a language in its own right and no longer a familiar level of Italian.

He participated in the beginnings of a regionalism led against France and its republic, caused in part by a catastrophic economic and social situation, pushing a growing number of Corsicans into exile to escape poverty. This protest movement included the preservation of the Corsican language and culture in opposition to "French acculturation", in other words colonization, aimed at dispossessing the Corsicans of their culture in order to better integrate them into that of the French republic (Corsica became French following a military invasion ending its independence in 1769 and its democratic regime founded by Pasquale Paoli, before being placed under military government for a century). Like most Corsican intellectuals, Casanova intended to resist this forced Frenchification of the Corsican nation through letters and the arts.

Casanova was the founder, in 1889, of the first newspaper in the Corsican language: A Tramuntanella, Fresca e Zitella, which became A Tramuntana, Fresca e Sana in 1896. This weekly dealt with politics and literature, but also practiced humor and satire and refused publications sent in Italian. Its publication stopped in 1919. Casanova was known for being a feared political polemicist, but also a gifted storyteller and a fine poet.

Two collections of his poems were published: Primavera corsa (1927) which is a collection of short stories and Fiori di Cirnu (1930) which brings together lyrical and satirical pieces. He published A primavera in Arburi in 1923 in the Annu Corsu.

At the end of his life, Casanova was accused by the French authorities of being an irredentist in favour of the union of Corsica with Italy. In fact, at the end of the 1930s in Corsica, his sympathy for Italy reached unimaginable heights and Casanova produced writings and poems celebrating the Italo-Ethiopian War. He was also given a pension by the Italian fascist government which financed his work on the Corsican language. He eventually settled in Livorno in Tuscany, where he died in 1936.

== Works ==
- Meraviglioso testamento di Francesco, morto in Cargese il 18 maggio 1875 (1876)
- Dialetto còrso : Contrasto curioso tra un Guagnese e un Chiglianese (1876)
- La morte e i funerali di Spanetto (1892)
- Primavera Corsa (1927)
- Fiori di Cirnu (1930)

== Bibliography ==
- Santu Casanova, Maraviglioso Testamento di Francesco, morto in Cargese, il 18 maggio 1875 (1876), Aiacciu, stamp. di G. Pompeani.
- Santu Casanova, La Morte è i Funerali di Spanetto (1892), Bastia, Ollagnier.
- Santu Casanova, Primavera Corsa (1927), Bastia, Cordier.
- Santu Casanova, Fiori di Cirnu.(1930) Bastia, stamp. di A. Muvra, Da l'Autore.
- Santu Casanova, L'invernu in Corsica, traduzzione da Dumenicu Poli, 2003, Accademia corsa.
- Ghjacumu Fusina, Santu Casanova, in Serpentini, Antone Lurenzu (dir.), Dizziunariu storicu di a Corsica, Albiana, 2006.
