= Civil Liberties Organization =

Nigerian non-governmental organization

Civil Liberties Organization is a Nigerian non-governmental organization focused on human rights and pro-democracy advocacy.

== History ==
The Civil Liberties Organization (CLO) has been promoting human rights in Nigeria since it began in 1987. On 12 August 1993, CLO's founder and president Olisa Agbakoba, was part of the leaders of the pro-democracy campaign against the nullification of the 12 June 1993 presidential elections by General Ibrahim Babaginda. Many CLO members were arrested and detained for several weeks and hospitalized after their release due to the harsh conditions they were subjected to while some still faced charges for possession of prodemocracy leaflets.

In 1995, African Commission on Human and Peoples' Rights received the petition of Civil Liberties Organization v. Nigeria, Comm. No. 129/94 (1995) where the CLO alleges that the military government of Nigeria had suspended the constitution, dissolved political parties, threatened the judiciary by ousting the jurisdiction of the courts, violated citizen fundamental rights, and enacted decrees in violation of the African Charter.

== Recent activism ==
- In 2014, the CLO sued the Inspector General of Police to court over prolonged detention of pro-Biafra activists.
- In February 2018, the CLO petitioned Ibikunle Amosun, then governor of Ogun State over unlawful acquisition of land in the state.
- In August 2018, the CLO threatened to sue Nyesom Wike, then governor of Rivers State for not fulfilling his promise to create the 5,000 civil service jobs for people of the state as he promised in 2019.
- In July 2021, the CLO in Akwa Ibom state protested the possible suppression of the EndSARS panel recommendations to the Akwa Ibom State Governor, Udom Emmanuel, by the panel's members.
- In July 2023, the CLO condemned the hike of pump price caused by the removal of petroleum subsidy by the presidential administration of Bola Ahmed Tinubu.

== Notable members ==
- Ahmed Adamu, Nigerian petroleum economist and lecturer, one time publicity secretary of the Kaduna branch of the CLO.
- Ayo Obe, British-Nigerian lawyer former president of the CLO.
- Auwal Musa Rafsanjani, founder of the Civil Society Legislative Advocacy Centre, member.
- Chidi Odinkalu, former Chairman of Nigeria's National Human Rights Commission, worked with the CLO as director of projects and planning.
- Alex Ibru, Nigerian Billionaire businessman, founder and publisher of The Guardian (Nigeria) newspaper, provided funding to the CLO during General Ibrahim Babangida's regime.
- Gani Adams, activist and current Aare Ona Kakanfo of Yorubaland, Public Relations Officer of Mushin local government chapter of the CLO in 1993
- Nnimmo Bassey, Nigerian architect, served on the Board of Directors of the CLO in the 1980s
- Ogaga Ifowodo, Nigerian lawyer, CLO human rights legal volunteer
- Abdul Mahmud, Nigerian lawyer, served as Director of Legal Services, the CLO.
- Emmanuel Onwe, human rights activist, Onwe was a founding member of the CLO.
