= Auwal Musa Rafsanjani =

Nigerian activist

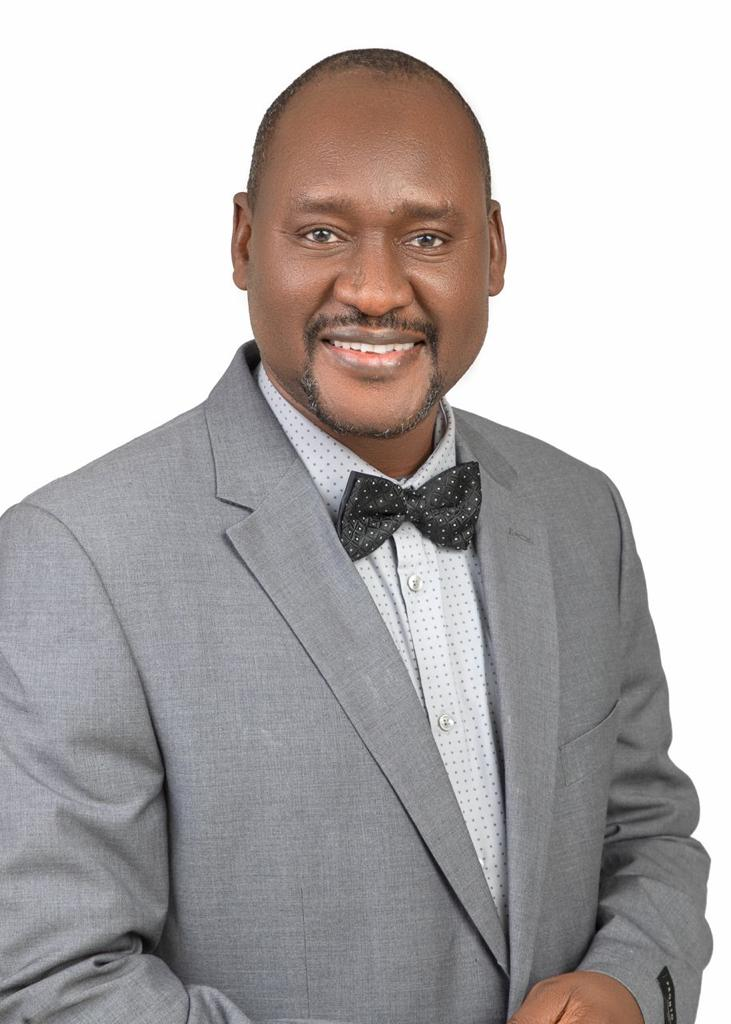
- Born: Kano
- Education: Bayero University Kano
- Alma mater: Bayero University Kano
- Occupation: Civil rights activist

Auwal Musa Rafsanjani is a Nigerian civil rights activist and the Executive Director of the Civil Society Legislative Advocacy Centre. He is the chairman, Board of Amnesty International, Nigeria.

== Early life and education ==
Rafsanjani was born in Kano and got a degree in political science at the Bayero University Kano. In 1992, he became the Assistant-General Secretary of National Association of Nigerian Students (NANS).

He got married in 2001 and gave birth to his first son in 2003.

== Advocacy ==
Rafsanjani has been a member of Civil Liberties Organization and a member of The Center for Democracy and Human Rights. He was a founding member of Campaign for Democracy, led by late Beko Ransome Kuti, Democratic Alternative, also a member and coordinator of United Action for Democracy (UAD) led by Olisa Agbakoba.

In 2005, he founded The Civil Society Legislative Advocacy Centre (CISLAC), a non-governmental, non-profit civil society organization with the primary mission to promote democratic governance and deepen democracy through legislative advocacy, capacity building, research, and information sharing.

He is a public commentator of Newspapers, Radio and TV shows: Al-Jazeera, CNN, BBC, NTA, AIT, TVC, Channel TV, VOA, Radio Germany, Radio France and Radio Iran, FRCN, among others in Hausa and English languages.

Apart from presentation of papers at national and international events, Auwal Musa has written several articles published across national dailies and international journals.

He also advocates for women and girl child that were forced to hard labour that there should be policies and framework in place to curb the problem and also providing job security and safety for them.

Auwal Musa was a delegate at the National Conference in Nigeria 2014 representing Civil Society Groups.

He was elected as the chairman of Transitioning Monitoring Group in 2021.
