= Italian irredentism =

Italian political movement

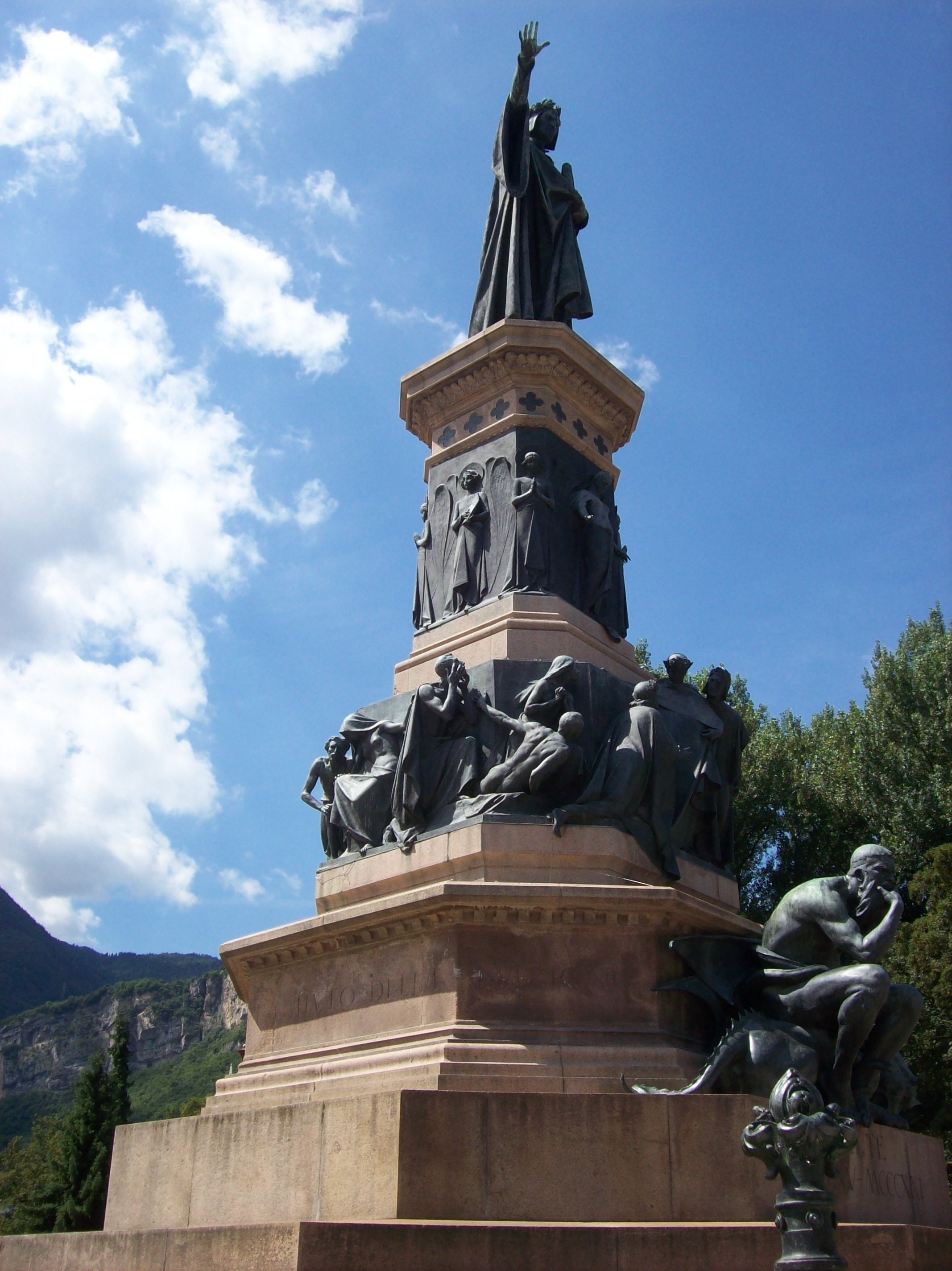
The Monument to Dante in Trento. Trento and Trieste, the main goals of Italian irredentists, were annexed by Italy at the end of WW1.

Map of the territories claimed by the proponents of a Greater Italy. Some Italian factions used irredentist arguments to promote the annexation of many other territories beyond Trento and Trieste.

Italian irredentism (Italian: irredentismo italiano [irredenˈtizmo itaˈljaːno]) was a political movement during the late 19th and early 20th centuries in the Kingdom of Italy. It originated to promote the annexation of majority Italian-speaking territories which were still retained by the Austrian Empire after three wars of independence (1848–1849, 1859 and 1866); specifically, Trento and Trieste were designated as the main terre irredente ("unredeemed lands"). Both provinces were ultimately annexed as a result of World War I, considered in Italian discourse to be the "fourth war of independence": the conclusion of the conflict on November 4, 1918, is still commemorated in Italy as National Unity Day. Thereafter, Italian irredentism waned in importance; however, Italian nationalists and fascists would use irredentist arguments to justify the Italianization of other territories Italy annexed in World War I (such as South Tyrol and the Slavic parts of Istria) and claim many other lands beyond Trento and Trieste. Those latter policies and claims have been abandoned by the Italian Republic.

== Overview ==
Animated map of the Italian unification from 1829 to 1871

Even after the Capture of Rome (1871), the final event of the unification of Italy, many ethnic Italian speakers (Trentino-Alto Adigan Italians, Savoyard Italians, Corfiot Italians, Niçard Italians, Swiss Italians, Corsican Italians, Maltese Italians, Istrian Italians and Dalmatian Italians) remained outside the borders of the Kingdom of Italy and this situation created the Italian irredentism. Up until World War I, the main terre irredente ("unredeemed lands") were considered to be the provinces of Trento and Trieste and, in a narrow sense, irredentists referred to the Italian patriots living in these two areas.

The term was later expanded to also include multilingual and multiethnic areas, where Italians were a relative majority or a substantial minority, within the northern Italian region encompassed by the Alps, with German, Italian, Slovene, Croatian, Ladin and Istro-Romanian population, such as South Tyrol, Istria, Gorizia and Gradisca and part of Dalmatia. The claims were further extended also to the city of Fiume, Corsica, the island of Malta, the County of Nice and Italian Switzerland.

After the end of World War I, the Italian irredentist movement largely disappeared in its original form, having achieved the goal of annexing Trento and Trieste; it was, however, hegemonised, manipulated and distorted by fascism, which made it an instrument of nationalist propaganda, placed at the center of a policy, conditioned by belated imperial ambitions, which took the form of "forced Italianizations", in the aspiration for the birth of a Great Italy and a vast Italian Empire. After World War II, Italian irredentism disappeared along with the defeated Fascists and the Monarchy of the House of Savoy. After the Treaty of Paris (1947) and the Treaty of Osimo (1975), the territorial claims of Fascist Italy were abandoned by the Italian Republic (see Foreign relations of Italy).

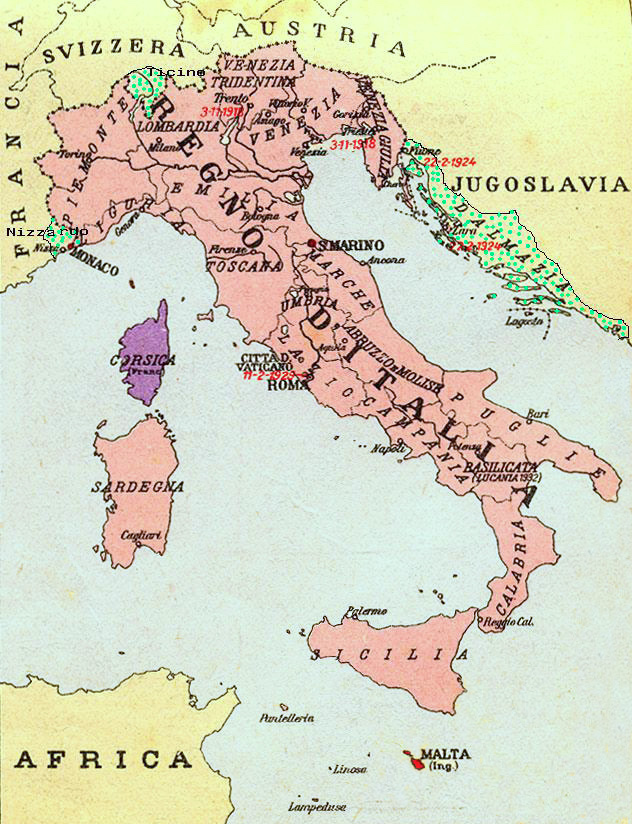
Italian ethnic regions claimed in the 1930s: Green: Nice, Ticino, and Dalmatia; Red: Malta; Violet: Corsica; Savoy and Corfu were claimed later.

== Characteristics ==
Italian irredentism was not a formal organization but rather an opinion movement, advocated by several different groups, claiming that Italy had to reach its "natural borders" or unify territories inhabited by Italians. Similar nationalistic ideas were common in Europe in the late 19th century. The term irredentism, coined from the Italian word, came into use in many countries (see List of irredentist claims or disputes). This idea of Italia irredenta is not to be confused with the Risorgimento, the historical events that led to irredentism, nor with nationalism or Imperial Italy, the political philosophy that took the idea further under fascism.

During the 19th century, Italian irredentism fully developed the characteristic of defending the Italian language from other people's languages, such as, for example, German in Switzerland and in the Austro-Hungarian Empire or French in Nice and Corsica.

The liberation of Italia irredenta was perhaps the strongest motive for Italy's entry into World War I, and the Treaty of Versailles in 1919 satisfied many irredentist claims.

Italian irredentism has the characteristic of being originally moderate, requesting only the return to Italy of the areas with Italian majority of population, but after World War I it became aggressive – under fascist influence – and claimed to the Kingdom of Italy even areas where Italians were a minority or had been present only in the past. In the first case, there were the Risorgimento claims on Trento, while in the second, there were the fascist claims on the Ionian Islands, Savoy and Malta.

== History ==
=== Origins ===
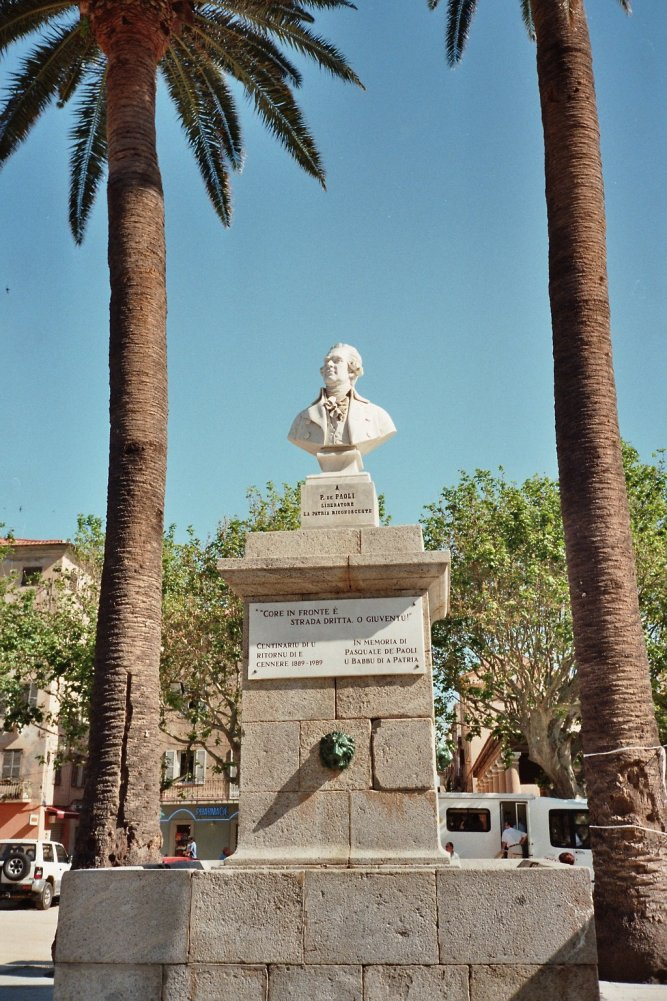
Monument to Pasquale Paoli, the Corsican hero who made Italian the official language of his Corsican Republic in 1755

The Corsican revolutionary Pasquale Paoli was called "the precursor of Italian irredentism" by Niccolò Tommaseo because he was the first to promote the Italian language and socio-culture (the main characteristics of Italian irredentism) in his island; Paoli wanted the Italian language to be the official language of the newly founded Corsican Republic.

Pasquale Paoli's appeal in 1768 against the French invader said:

We are Corsicans by birth and sentiment, but first of all we feel Italian by language, origins, customs, traditions; and Italians are all brothers and united in the face of history and in the face of God ... As Corsicans we wish to be neither slaves nor "rebels" and as Italians we have the right to deal as equals with the other Italian brothers ... Either we shall be free or we shall be nothing... Either we shall win or we shall die (against the French), weapons in hand ... The war against France is right and holy as the name of God is holy and right, and here on our mountains will appear for Italy the sun of liberty

— Pasquale Paoli

Paoli's Corsican Constitution of 1755 was written in Italian, and the short-lived university he founded in the city of Corte in 1765 used Italian as the official language. Paoli was sympathetic to Italian culture and regarded his own native language as an Italian dialect (Corsican is an Italo-Dalmatian tongue closely related to Tuscan).

After the Italian unification and Third Italian War of Independence in 1866, there were areas with Italian-speaking communities within the borders of several countries around the newly created Kingdom of Italy. The irredentists sought to annex all those areas to the newly unified Italy. The areas targeted were Corsica, Dalmatia, Gorizia, Istria, Malta, County of Nice, Ticino, small parts of Grisons and of Valais, Trentino, Trieste and Fiume.

Different movements or groups founded in this period included the Italian politician Matteo Renato Imbriani inventing the new term terre irredente ("unredeemed lands") in 1877; in the same year the movement Associazione in pro dell'Italia Irredenta ("Association for the Unredeemed Italy") was founded; in 1885 the Pro Patria movement ("For Fatherland") was founded and in 1891 the Lega Nazionale Italiana ("Italian National League") was founded in Trento and Trieste (in the Austrian Empire).

Initially, the movement can be described as part of the more general nation-building process in Europe in the 19th and 20th centuries, when the multi-national Austro-Hungarian, Russian and Ottoman Empires were being replaced by nation-states. The Italian nation-building process can be compared to similar movements in Germany (Großdeutschland), Hungary, Serbia and in pre-1914 Poland. Simultaneously, in many parts of 19th-century Europe liberalism and nationalism were ideologies which were coming to the forefront of political culture. In Eastern Europe, where the Habsburg Empire had long asserted control over a variety of ethnic and cultural groups, nationalism appeared in a standard format. The beginning of the 19th century "was the period when the smaller, mostly indigenous nationalities of the empire – Czechs, Slovaks, Slovenes, Croats, Serbs, Ukrainians, Romanians – remembered their historical traditions, revived their native tongues as literary languages, reappropriated their traditions and folklore, in short, reasserted their existence as nations".

=== 19th century ===
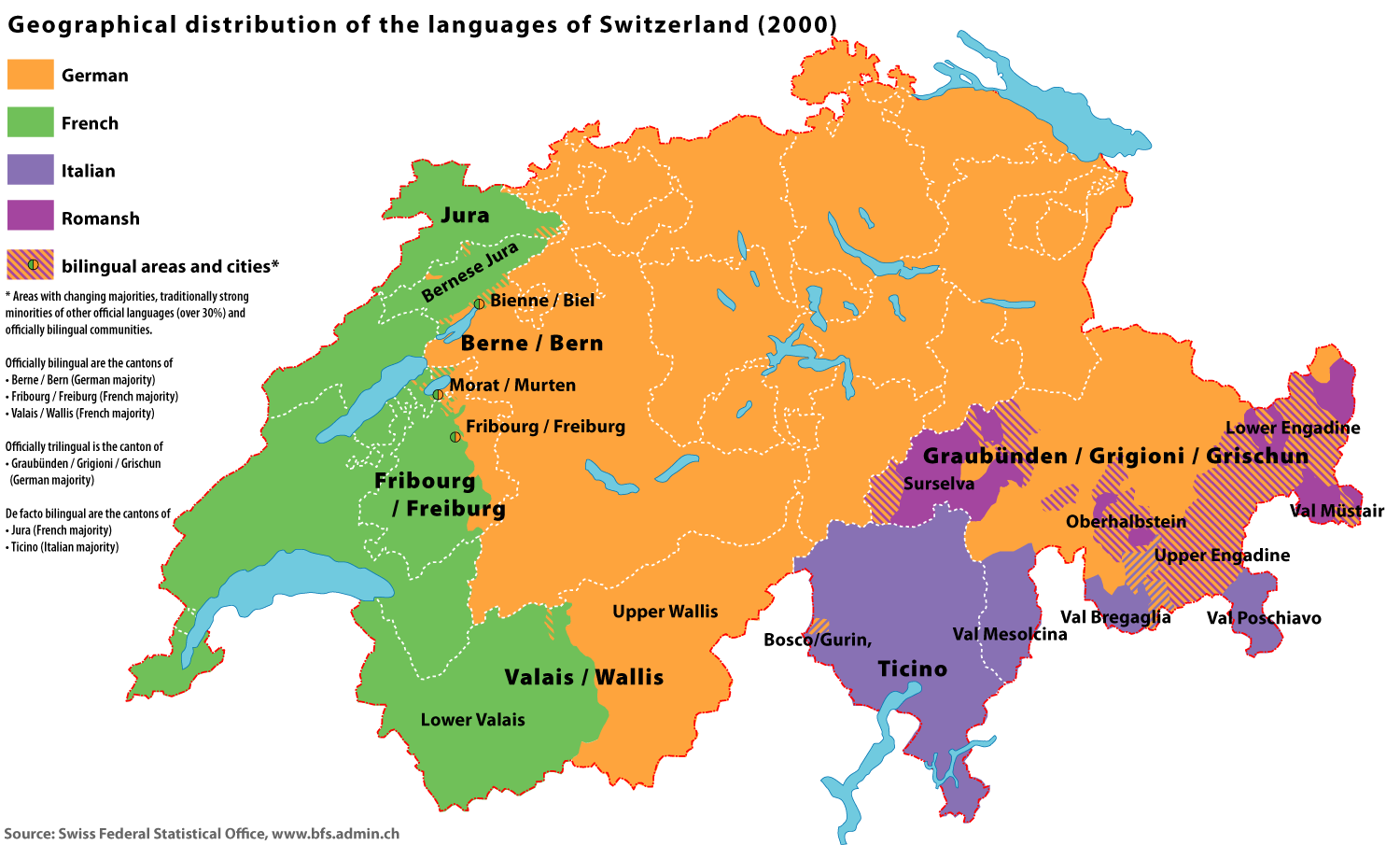
Map of Switzerland showing in purple the Italian-speaking areas, where Italian irredentism was strongest

In the early 19th century, the ideals of unification in a single Nation of all the territories populated by Italian-speaking people created Italian irredentism.

The current Italian Switzerland belonged to the Duchy of Milan until the 16th century, when it became part of Switzerland. These territories have maintained their native Italian population speaking the Italian language and the Lombard language, specifically the Ticinese dialect. Italian irredentism in Switzerland was based on moderate Risorgimento ideals, and was promoted by Italian-Ticinese such as Adolfo Carmine.

Following a brief French occupation (1798–1800), the British established control over Malta while it was still formally part of the Kingdom of Sicily. During both the French and British periods, Malta officially remained part of the Sicilian Kingdom, although the French refused to recognise the island as such, in contrast to the British. Malta became a British Crown Colony in 1813, which was confirmed a year later through the Treaty of Paris (1814). Cultural changes were few even after 1814. In 1842, all literate Maltese learned Italian, while only 4.5% could read, write and/or speak English. However, there was a huge increase in the number of Maltese magazines and newspapers in the Italian language during the 1800s and early 1900s, so as a consequence the Italian was understood (but not spoken fluently) by more than half the Maltese people before WW1.

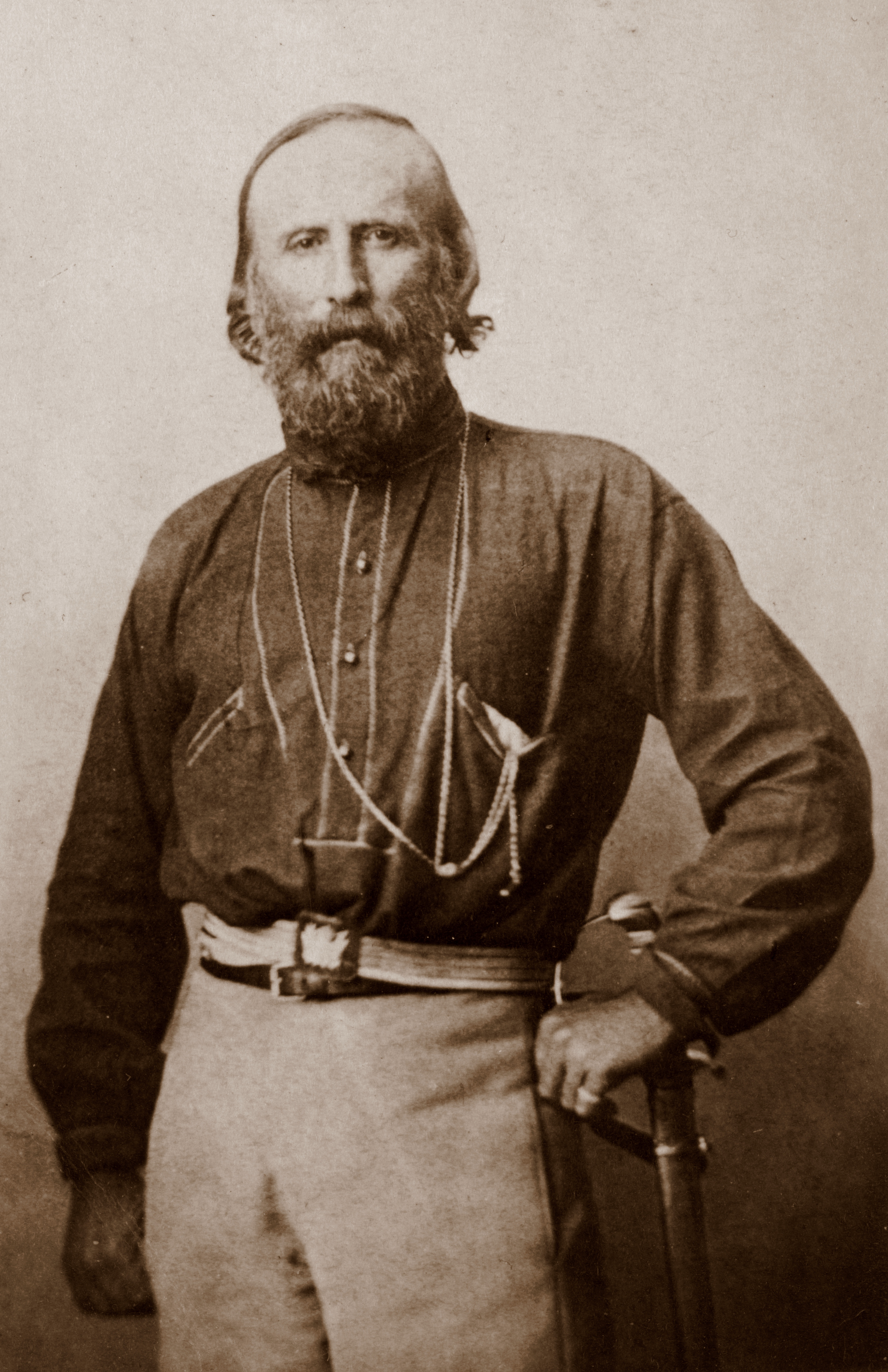
Giuseppe Garibaldi, a prominent Niçard Italian

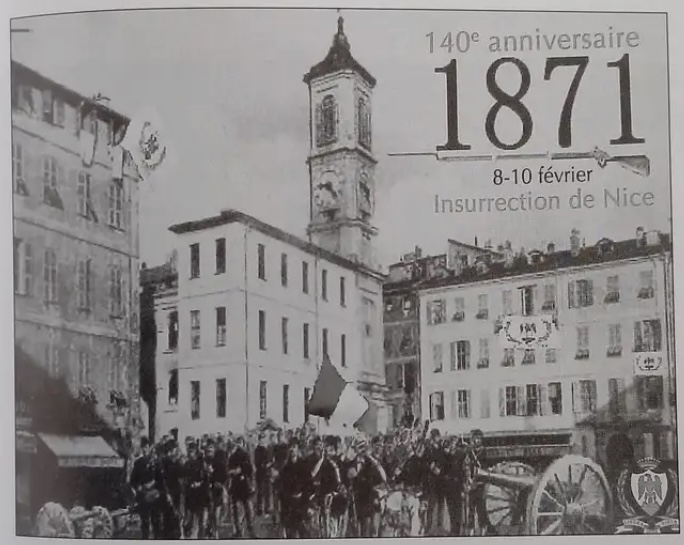
Pro-Italian protests in Nice, 1871, during the Niçard Vespers

The Kingdom of Sardinia again attacked the Austrian Empire in the Second Italian War of Independence of 1859, with the aid of France, resulting in the liberation of Lombardy. On the basis of the Plombières Agreement, the Kingdom of Sardinia ceded Savoy and Nice to France, an event that caused the Niçard exodus, which was the emigration of a quarter of the Niçard Italians to Italy. Giuseppe Garibaldi was elected in 1871 in Nice at the National Assembly where he tried to promote the annexation of his hometown to the newborn Italian unitary state, but he was prevented from speaking. Because of this denial, between 1871 and 1872 there were riots in Nice, promoted by the Garibaldini and called "Niçard Vespers", which demanded the annexation of the city and its area to Italy. Fifteen Nice people who participated in the rebellion were tried and sentenced.

In the spring of 1860, Savoy was annexed to France after a referendum and the administrative boundaries changed, but a segment of the Savoyard population demonstrated against the annexation. Indeed, the final vote count on the referendum announced by the Court of Appeals was 130,839 in favour of annexation to France, 235 opposed and 71 void, showing questionable complete support for French nationalism (that motivated criticisms about rigged results). At the beginning of 1860, more than 3000 people demonstrated in Chambéry against the annexation to France rumours. On 16 March 1860, the provinces of Northern Savoy (Chablais, Faucigny and Genevois) sent to Victor Emmanuel II, to Napoleon III, and to the Swiss Federal Council a declaration - sent under the presentation of a manifesto together with petitions - where they were saying that they did not wish to become French and shown their preference to remain united to the Kingdom of Sardinia (or be annexed to Switzerland in the case a separation with Sardinia was unavoidable). Giuseppe Garibaldi complained about the referendum that allowed France to annex Savoy and Nice, and a group of his followers (among the Italian Savoyards) took refuge in Italy in the following years.

In 1861, with the proclamation of the Kingdom of Italy, the modern Italian state was born. On 21 July 1878, a noisy public meeting was held at Rome with Menotti Garibaldi, the son of Giuseppe Garibaldi, as chairman of the forum and a clamour was raised for the formation of volunteer battalions to conquer the Trentino. Benedetto Cairoli, then Prime Minister of Italy, treated the agitation with tolerance. However, it was mainly superficial, as most Italians did not wish a dangerous policy against Austria or against Britain for Malta.

Many Istrian Italians and Dalmatian Italians looked with sympathy towards the Risorgimento movement that fought for the unification of Italy. However, after the Third Italian War of Independence (1866), when the Veneto and Friuli regions were ceded by the Austrians to the newly formed Kingdom of Italy, Istria and Dalmatia remained part of the Austro-Hungarian Empire, together with other Italian-speaking areas on the eastern Adriatic. This triggered the gradual rise of Italian irredentism among many Italians in Istria, Kvarner and Dalmatia, who demanded the unification of the Julian March, Kvarner and Dalmatia with Italy. The Austrians saw the Italians as enemies and favoured the Slav communities of Istria, Kvarner and Dalmatia. During the meeting of the Council of Ministers of 12 November 1866, Emperor Franz Joseph I of Austria outlined a wide-ranging project aimed at the Germanization or Slavization of the areas of the empire with an Italian presence:

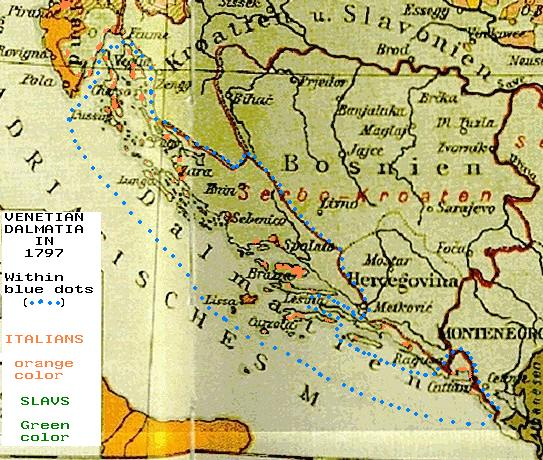
Austrian linguistic map from 1896. In green, the areas where Slavs were the majority of the population, in orange the areas where Istrian Italians and Dalmatian Italians were the majority of the population. The boundaries of Venetian Dalmatia in 1797 are delimited with blue dots.

His Majesty expressed the precise order that action be taken decisively against the influence of the Italian elements still present in some regions of the Crown and, appropriately occupying the posts of public, judicial, masters employees as well as with the influence of the press, work in South Tyrol, Dalmatia and Littoral for the Germanization and Slavization of these territories according to the circumstances, with energy and without any regard. His Majesty calls the central offices to the strong duty to proceed in this way to what has been established.

— Franz Joseph I of Austria, Council of the Crown of 12 November 1866

Istrian Italians made up about a third of the population in 1900. Dalmatia, especially its maritime cities, once had a substantial local ethnic Italian population (Dalmatian Italians). According to the Austrian census, the Dalmatian Italians formed 12.5% of the population in 1865. In the 1910 Austro-Hungarian census, Istria had a population of 57.8% Slavic-speakers (Croat and Slovene), and 38.1% Italian speakers. For the Austrian Kingdom of Dalmatia, (i.e. Dalmatia), the 1910 numbers were 96.2% Slavic speakers and 2.8% Italian speakers.

Before 1859, Italian was the language of administration, education, the press, and the Austrian navy, and people who wished to acquire higher social standing and separate from the Slav peasantry became Italians. In the years after 1866, Italians lost their privileges in Austria-Hungary, their assimilation of the Slavs came to an end, and they found themselves under growing pressure by other rising nations; with the rising Slav tide after 1890, italianized Slavs reverted to being Croats. Austrian rulers found use of the racial antagonism and financed Slav schools and promoted Croatian as the official language, and many Italians chose voluntary exile. In 1909, the Italian language lost its status as the official language of Dalmatia in favor of Croatian only, and Italian could no longer be used in the public and administrative sphere.

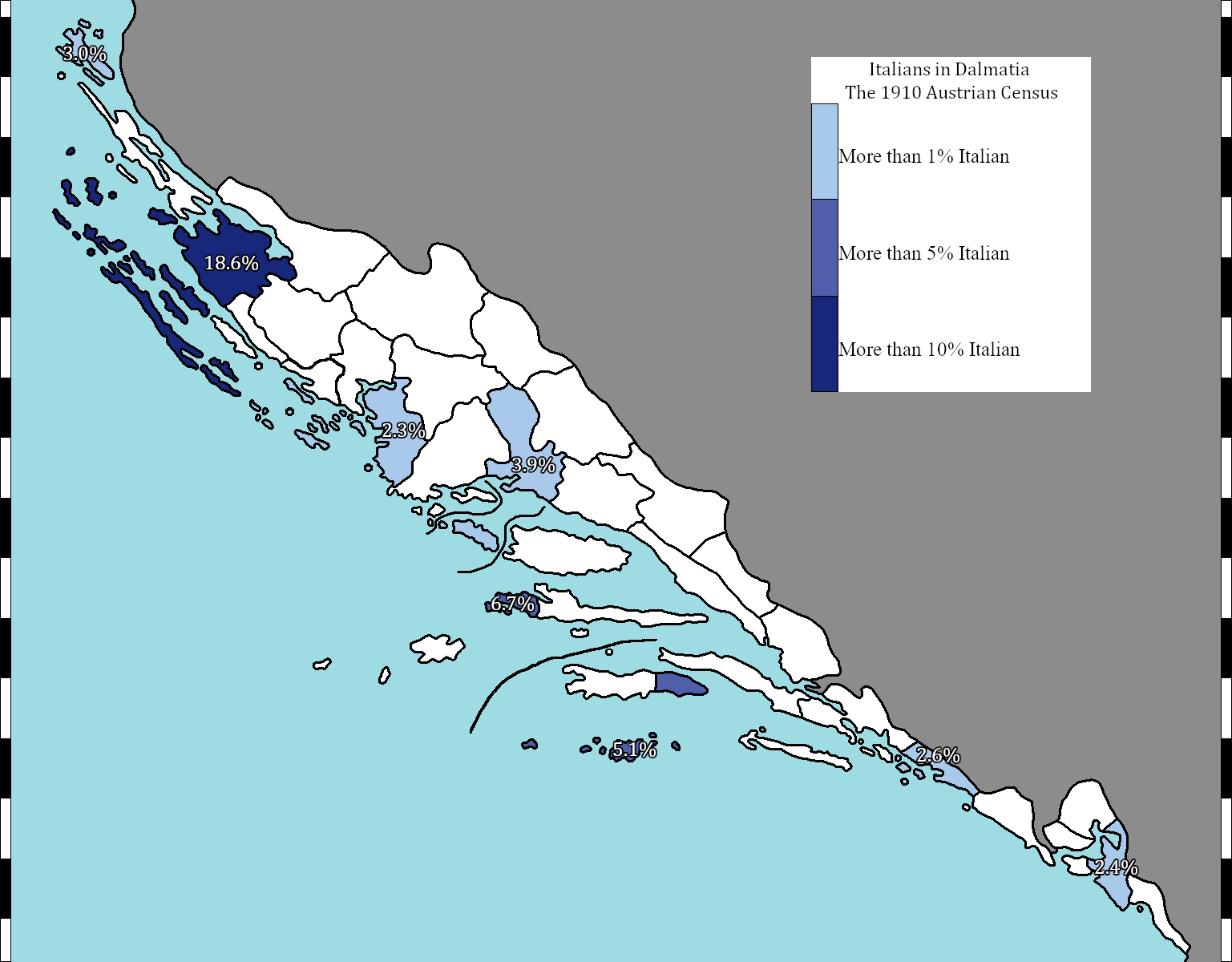
Proportion of Dalmatian Italians in districts of Dalmatia in 1910, per the Austro-Hungarian census

One consequence of irredentist ideas outside of Italy was an assassination plot organized against the Emperor Francis Joseph in Trieste in 1882, which was detected and foiled. Guglielmo Oberdan, a Triestine and thus Austrian citizen, was executed. When the irredentist movement became troublesome to Italy through the activity of Republicans and Socialists, it was subject to effective police control by Agostino Depretis.

Irredentism faced a setback when the French occupation of Tunisia in 1881 started a crisis in French–Italian relations. The government entered into relations with Austria and Germany, which took shape with the formation of the Triple Alliance in 1882. The irredentists' dream of absorbing the targeted areas into Italy made no further progress in the 19th century, as the borders of the Kingdom of Italy remained unchanged and the Rome government began to set up colonies in Eritrea and Somalia in Africa.

=== World War I ===
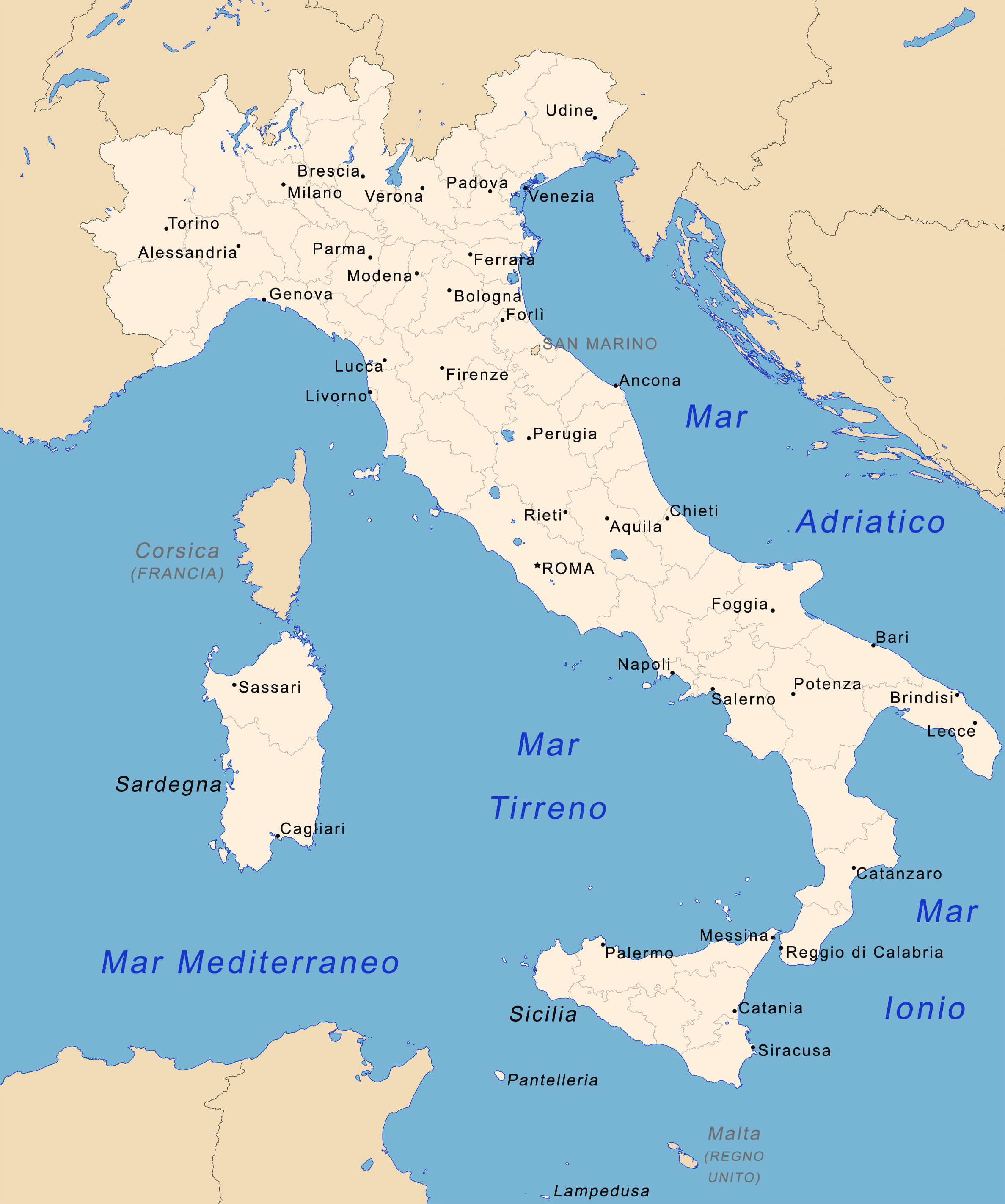
On the left, a map of the Kingdom of Italy before the World War I, and on the right, a map of the Kingdom of Italy after World War I

Italy entered the World War I in 1915 with the aim of completing national unity: for this reason, the Italian intervention in the World War I is also considered the Fourth Italian War of Independence, in a historiographical perspective that identifies in the latter the conclusion of the unification of Italy, whose military actions began during the revolutions of 1848 with the First Italian War of Independence.

Italy signed the Treaty of London (1915) and entered World War I with the intention of gaining those territories perceived by irredentists as being Italian under foreign rule. According to the pact, Italy was to leave the Triple Alliance and join the Entente Powers. Furthermore, Italy was to declare war on Germany and Austria-Hungary within a month. The declaration of war was duly published on 23 May 1915. In exchange, Italy was to obtain various territorial gains at the end of the war. In April 1918, in what he described as an open letter "to the American Nation" Paolo Thaon di Revel, Commander in Chief of the Italian navy, appealed to the people of the United States to support Italian territorial claims over Trento, Trieste, Istria, Dalmatia and the Adriatic, writing that "we are fighting to expel an intruder from our home".

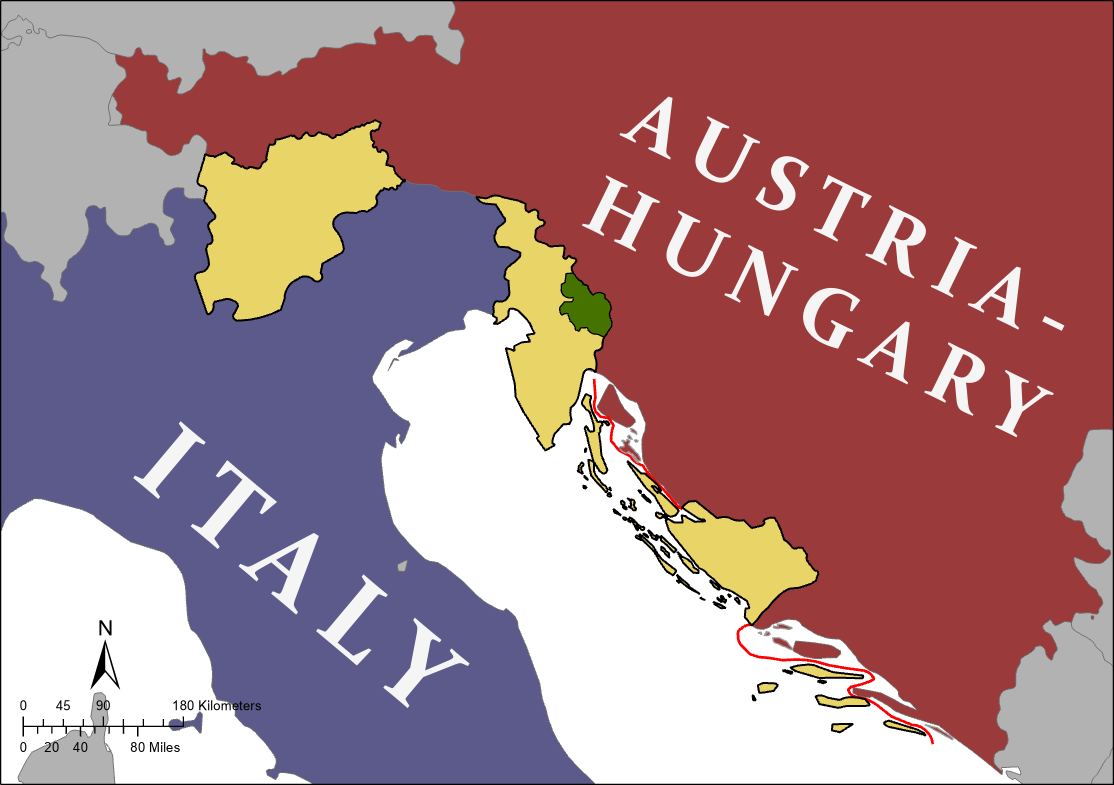
Territories promised to Italy by the secret Treaty of London (1915), i.e. Trentino-Alto Adige, the Julian March and Dalmatia (tan), and the Snežnik Plateau area (green). Dalmatia, after World War I, however, was not assigned to Italy but to Yugoslavia.

The outcome of World War I and the consequent settlement of the Treaty of Saint-Germain met some Italian claims, including many (but not all) of the aims of the Italia irredenta party. Italy gained Trieste, Gorizia, Istria and the Dalmatian city of Zara. In Dalmatia, despite the London Pact, only territories with Italian majority as Zara with some Dalmatian islands, such as Cherso, Lussino and Lagosta were annexed by Italy because Woodrow Wilson, supporting Yugoslav claims and not recognizing the treaty, rejected Italian requests on other Dalmatian territories, so this outcome was denounced as a "Mutilated victory". The rhetoric of "Mutilated victory" was adopted by Benito Mussolini and led to the rise of Italian fascism, becoming a key point in the propaganda of Fascist Italy. Historians regard "Mutilated victory" as a "political myth", used by fascists to fuel Italian imperialism and obscure the successes of liberal Italy in the aftermath of World War I.

The city of Fiume in the Kvarner was the subject of claim and counter-claim: Italians claimed it on the principle of self-determination, disregarding its mainly Slavic suburb of Susak. Fiume had not been promised to Italy in the London Pact, though it was to become Italian by 1924 (see Italian Regency of Carnaro, Treaty of Rapallo, 1920 and Treaty of Rome, 1924). The stand taken by the irredentist Gabriele D'Annunzio, which briefly led him to become an enemy of the Italian state, was meant to provoke a nationalist revival through corporatism (first instituted during his rule over Fiume), in front of what was widely perceived as state corruption engineered by governments such as Giovanni Giolitti's. D'Annunzio briefly annexed to this Italian Regency of Carnaro even the Dalmatian islands of Veglia and Arbe, where there was a numerous Italian community.

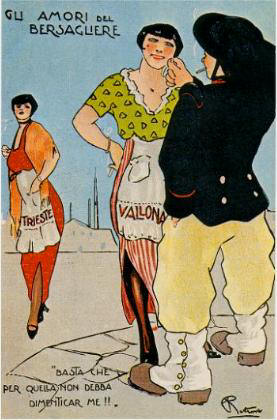
Satiric picture about the Italian interest in Valona (now Vlorë, Albania) being detrimental to Trieste before WWI

=== Fascism and World War II ===
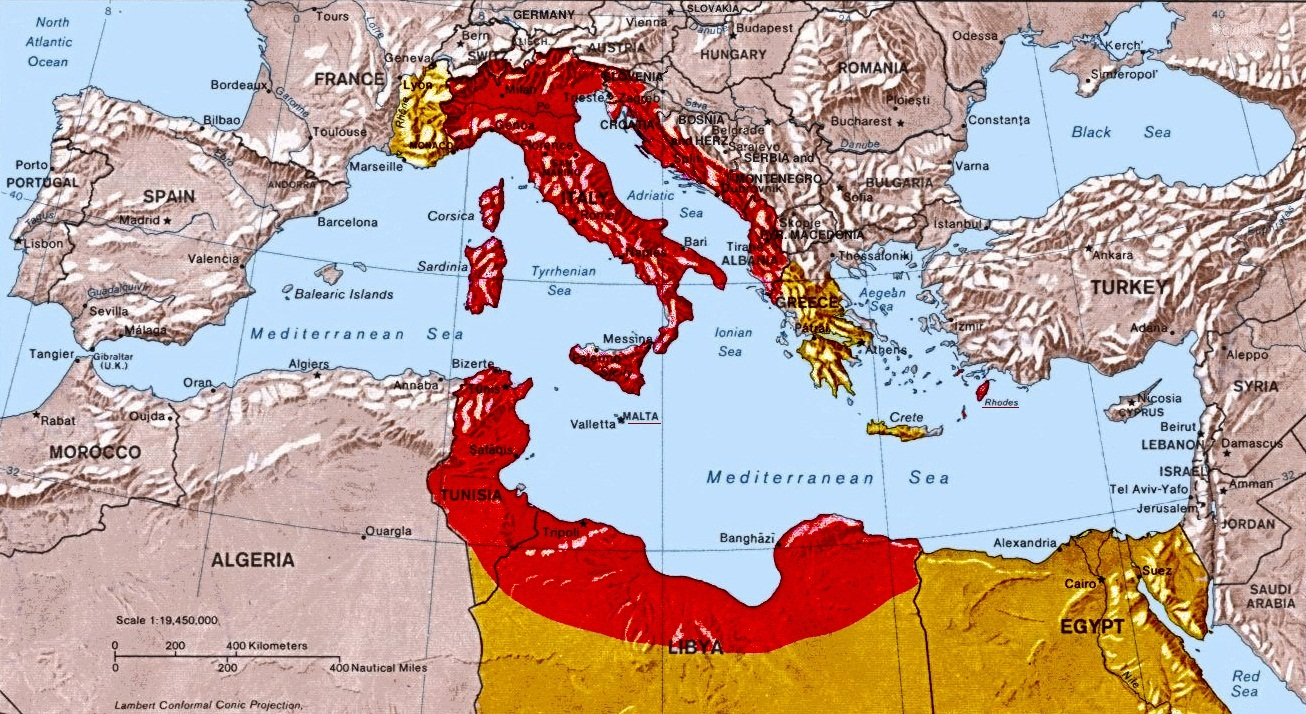
The fascist nationalist-irredentist project of Great Italy (in red), inserted in a part of the Italian Empire (in yellow)

After the end of World War I, the Italian irredentist movement was hegemonised, manipulated and distorted by fascism, which made it an instrument of nationalist propaganda, placed at the centre of a policy, conditioned by belated imperial ambitions, which took the form of "forced Italianizations", in the aspiration for the birth of a Great Italy and a vast Italian Empire.

Fascist Italy strove to be seen as the natural result of war heroism against a "betrayed Italy" that had not been awarded all it "deserved", as well as appropriating the image of Arditi soldiers. In this vein, irredentist claims were expanded and often used in Fascist Italy's desire to control the Mediterranean basin.

To the east of Italy, the Fascists claimed that Dalmatia was a land of Italian culture whose Italians had been driven out of Dalmatia and into exile in Italy, and supported the return of Italians of Dalmatian heritage. Mussolini identified Dalmatia as having strong Italian cultural roots for centuries via the Roman Empire and the Republic of Venice. The Fascists especially focused their claims based on the Venetian cultural heritage of Dalmatia, claiming that Venetian rule had been beneficial for all Dalmatians and had been accepted by the Dalmatian population. The Fascists were outraged after World War I, when the agreement between Italy and the Entente Allies in the Treaty of London of 1915 to have Dalmatia join Italy was revoked in 1919.

To the west of Italy, the Fascists claimed that the territories of Corsica, Nice and Savoy held by France were Italian lands. The Fascist regime produced literature on Corsica that presented evidence of the island's italianità. The Fascist regime produced literature on Nice that justified that Nice was an Italian land based on historical, ethnic and linguistic grounds. The Fascists quoted Medieval Italian scholar Petrarch who said: "The border of Italy is the Var; consequently Nice is a part of Italy". The Fascists quoted Italian national hero Giuseppe Garibaldi, a native of Nizza (now called Nice) himself, who said: "Corsica and Nice must not belong to France; there will come the day when an Italy mindful of its true worth will reclaim its provinces now so shamefully languishing under foreign domination". Mussolini initially pursued promoting annexation of Corsica through political and diplomatic means, believing that Corsica could be annexed to Italy through Italy first encouraging the existing autonomist tendencies in Corsica and then the independence of Corsica from France, that would be followed by the annexation of Corsica into Italy.

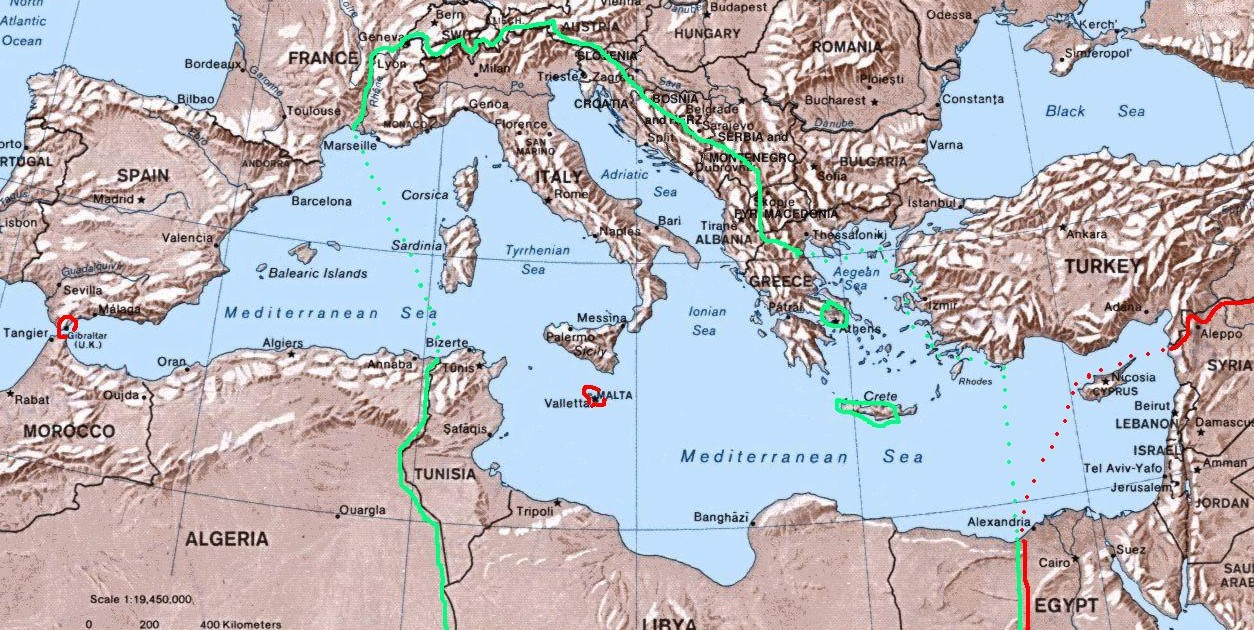
Map of the Italian Mare Nostrum in the summer of 1942, during World War II. In green are the territories controlled by the Italian Navy, in red are the territories controlled by the Allies.

In 1923, Mussolini temporarily occupied Corfu, using irredentist claims based on minorities of Italians in the island, the Corfiot Italians. Similar tactics may have been used towards the islands around the Kingdom of Italy – through the Maltese Italians, Corfiot Italians and Corsican Italians in order to control the Mediterranean sea (his Mare Nostrum, from the Latin "Our Sea").

In the 1930s Mussolini promoted the development of an initial Italian irredentism in Durrës, in order to occupy all of Albania later. Durrës (called "Durazzo" in Italian) has been, for centuries, during the Middle Ages, a city with territory under the control of the Italian states (Naples, Sicily, Venice), and many Italians settled there. The Durazzo section of the Albanian Fascist Party was created in 1938, which was formed by some citizens of the city with distant and recent Italian roots (they started the local Italian irredentism). In 1939, all of Albania was occupied and united to the Kingdom of Italy: Italian citizens (more than 11,000) began to settle in Albania as colonists and to own land in 1940 so that they could gradually transform it into Italian territory. The italianization of Albania was one of Mussolini's plans.

During World War II, large parts of Dalmatia were annexed by Italy into the Governorship of Dalmatia from 1941 to 1943. Corsica and Nice were also administratively annexed by Italy in November 1942. Malta was heavily bombed, but was not occupied due to Erwin Rommel's request to divert to North Africa the forces that had been prepared for the invasion of the island.

=== Dalmatia and the World Wars ===
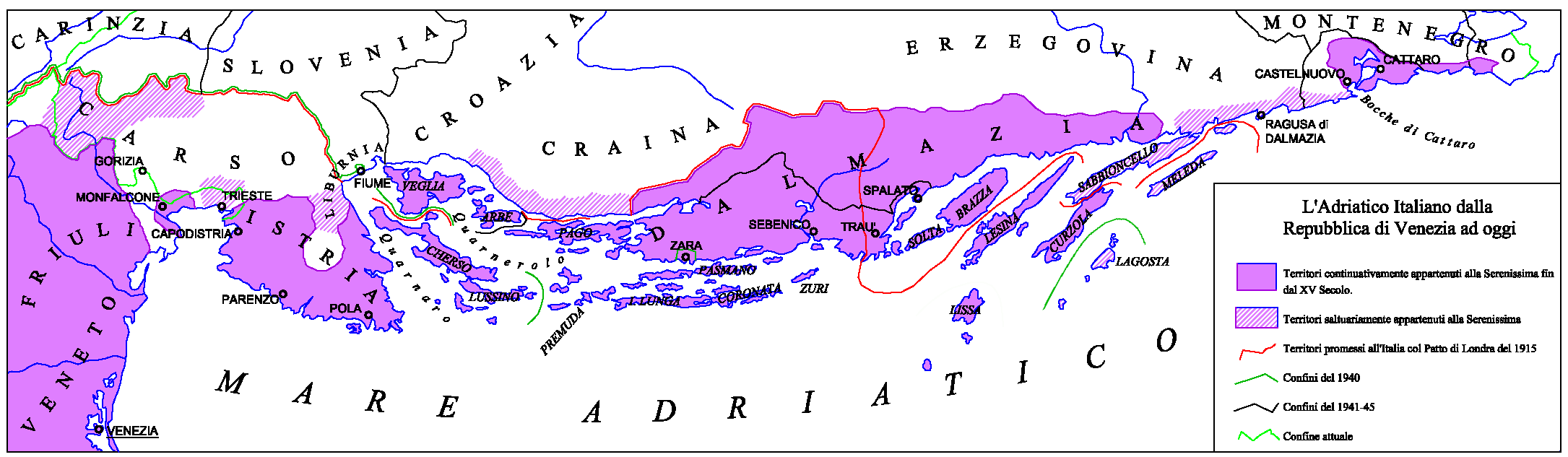
Map of Dalmatia and Istria with the boundaries set by the Treaty of London (1915) (red line) and those actually obtained from Italy (green line). The black line marks the border of the Governorate of Dalmatia (1941–1943). The ancient domains of the Republic of Venice are indicated in fuchsia (dashed diagonally, the territories that belonged occasionally).

Dalmatia was a strategic region during World War I that both Italy and Serbia intended to seize from Austria-Hungary. Italy joined the Triple Entente Allies in 1915 upon agreeing to the Treaty of London (1915) that guaranteed Italy the right to annex a large portion of Dalmatia in exchange for Italy's participation on the Allied side. From 5–6 November 1918, Italian forces were reported to have reached Lissa, Lagosta, Sebenico, and other localities on the Dalmatian coast. By the end of hostilities in November 1918, the Italian military had seized control of the entire portion of Dalmatia that had been guaranteed to Italy by the Treaty of London and by 17 November had seized Fiume as well. In 1918, Admiral Enrico Millo declared himself Italy's Governor of Dalmatia. Famous Italian nationalist Gabriele d'Annunzio supported the seizure of Dalmatia and proceeded to Zara in an Italian warship in December 1918.

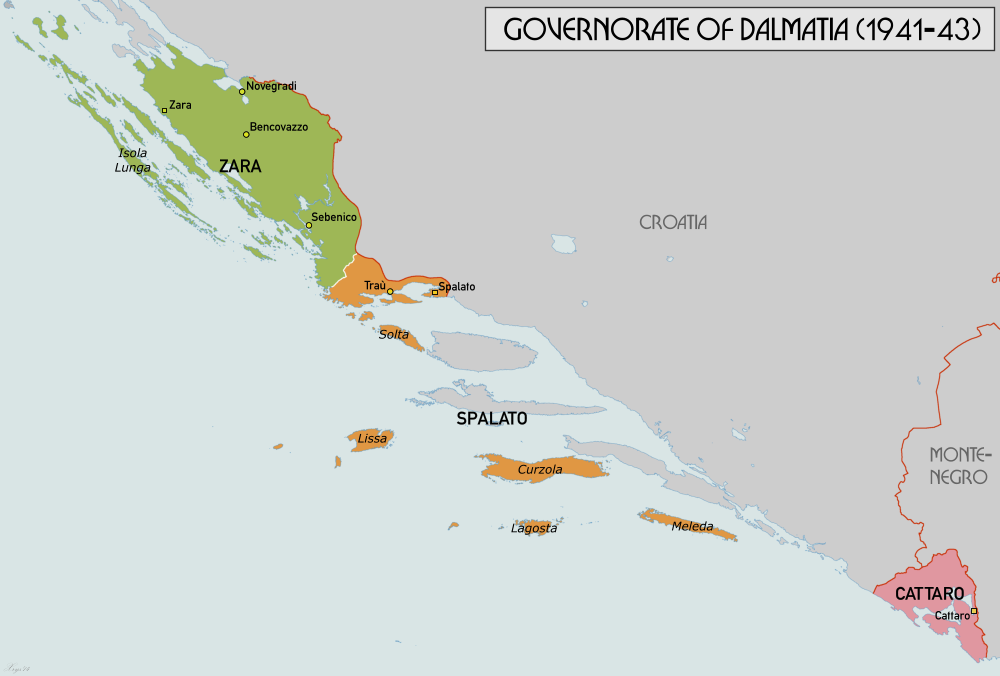
Detailed map of the three Italian provinces of the Governorate of Dalmatia: province of Zara, province of Spalato and province of Cattaro

The last city with a significant Italian presence in Dalmatia was the city of Zara (now called Zadar). In the Austro-Hungarian census of 1910, the city of Zara had an Italian population of 9,318 (or 69.3% out of the total of 13,438 inhabitants). In 1921, the population grew to 17,075 inhabitants, of which 12,075 Italians (corresponding to 70.76%).

In 1941, during the Second World War, Yugoslavia was occupied by Italy and Germany. Dalmatia was divided between Italy, which constituted the Governorate of Dalmatia, and the Independent State of Croatia, which annexed Ragusa and Morlachia. After the Italian surrender (8 September 1943), the Independent State of Croatia annexed the Governorate of Dalmatia, except for the territories that had been Italian before the start of the conflict, such as Zara. In 1943, Josip Broz Tito informed the Allies that Zara was a chief logistic centre for German forces in Yugoslavia. By overstating its importance, he persuaded them of its military significance. Italy surrendered in September 1943, and over the following year, specifically between 2 November 1943 and 31 October 1944, Allied Forces bombarded the town fifty-four times. Nearly 2,000 people were buried beneath rubble: 10–12,000 people escaped and took refuge in Trieste, and slightly over 1,000 reached Apulia. Tito's partisans entered Zara on 31 October 1944, and 138 people were killed. With the Peace Treaty of 1947, Italians still living in Zara followed the Italian exodus from Dalmatia and only about 100 Dalmatian Italians now remain in the city.

=== Post-World War II ===
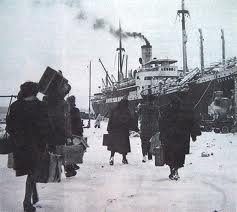
Istrian Italians leave Pola in 1947 during the Istrian-Dalmatian exodus

The 5 autonomous regions of Italy in red and the 15 ordinary regions in grey

Under the 1947 Treaty of Peace with Italy, Istria, Kvarner, most of the Julian March as well as the Dalmatian city of Zara were annexed by Yugoslavia. The treaty provided for the right of option of Italian citizens living in the territories that were to be taken over by Greece, France, and Yugoslavia to remain Italian citizens, with the possibility of request by those states that they moved out of the area within a year. The ensuing Istrian-Dalmatian exodus led to the emigration of between 230,000 and 350,000 of local ethnic Italians (Istrian Italians and Dalmatian Italians), the others being ethnic Slovenians, ethnic Croatians, and ethnic Istro-Romanians, choosing to maintain Italian citizenship.

The Istrian-Dalmatian exodus started in 1943 and ended completely only in 1960. According to the census organized in Croatia in 2001 and that organized in Slovenia in 2002, there were 2,258 Italians in Slovenia and 19,636 in Croatia.

After World War II, Italian irredentism disappeared along with the defeated Fascists and the Monarchy of the House of Savoy. After the Treaty of Paris (1947) and the Treaty of Osimo (1975), all territorial claims were abandoned by the Italian Republic (see Foreign relations of Italy). The Italian irredentist movement thus vanished from Italian politics. Today, Italy, France, Malta, Greece, Croatia and Slovenia are all members of the European Union, while Montenegro and Albania are candidates for accession. The 1947 Constitution of Italy established five autonomous regions (Sardinia, Friuli-Venezia Giulia, Sicily, Aosta Valley and Trentino-Alto Adige/Südtirol), in recognition of their cultural and linguistic distinctiveness.

In the early 1990s, the breakup of Yugoslavia caused nationalistic sentiments to re-emerge in these areas; worthy of note in this regard are the demonstrations in Trieste on 6 October 1991 "for a new Italian irredentism". These were promoted by the Italian Social Movement and inspired by rumours about negotiations for the passage through Trieste of the Yugoslav troops expelled from Slovenia during the Ten-Day War which saw the participation of thousands of people at the political rally in Piazza della Borsa followed by a long procession through the streets of the city, and on 8 November 1992, again in Trieste.

The same Italian Social Movement and National Alliance asked for the review of the peace treaties signed by Italy after World War II, especially with regard to Zone B of the former Free Territory of Trieste, given that the qualification of Slovenia and Croatia as heirs of Yugoslavia was not a given and that the division of Istria between Slovenia and Croatia contradicted the clauses of the peace treaties which guaranteed the unity of the surviving Italian component in Istria (Istrian Italians), assigned to Yugoslavia after World War II, proposing the creation of an Istrian Euro-region also including the city of Rijeka. These claims, which also concerned Dalmatia (including islands such as Pag, Ugljan, Vis, Lastovo, Hvar, Korčula and Mljet) and the coast with the cities of Zadar, Šibenik, Trogir and Split, remained completely unheeded by all the Italian governments that followed one another in that period.

== Claimed territories ==
Although Trento and Trieste were considered to be the main "unredeemed lands", other territories were variously claimed as such by a part of Italian nationalists and fascists, including:

- Some Alpine territories on the eastern border, like Tarvisio, Aquileia, Cervignano del Friuli and Val Canale, which were part of Austria-Hungary until 1918, today part of the Province of Udine.
- Trentino, claimed between 1848 and 1918, Cesare Battisti and Alcide De Gasperi were notable Italian irredentists from Trentino.
- Ladin speaking territories (Ladinia) , considered an Italian dialect during the 19th and 20th century by Italian nationalists and irredentists.
- Alto Adige (South Tyrol) , already claimed before WW1 by Giuseppe Mazzini and Ettore Tolomei, considered a latin and ladin territory which was germanized and should return Italian politically and linguistically. Then claimed by Italy in WW1 in the Treaty of London as a defensive and natural alpine border.
- Gorizia (Province of Gorizia) , claimed between 1848 and 1918. It was also claimed the hinterland, called Carso or Isontino up to Idria, Postumia, Longatico, Circonio and Olisa.
- Trieste, claimed between 1848 and 1918, then reclaimed by Italy between 1947 and 1954, when the city was the Free Territory of Trieste, the city returned to Italy in 1954. It was also claimed the hinterland, called Carso or Isontino up to Idria, Postumia, Longatico, Circonio and Olisa. Guglielmo Oberdan was a notable Italian irredentist from the city.
- Istria (Istria County) , claimed between 1866 and 1918, It was also claimed the hinterland with Castua up to Fuzine. Istria was part of Italy between 1920 and 1947, the Italian Republic claimed zone B of the Free territory of Trieste from 1947 to 1975, when the Treaty of Osimo was signed. Nazario Sauro was an Italian irredentist from Koper.
- Fiume, claimed between 1866 and 1924, Italy did not receive the city in the Treaty of Versailles, this led to the Vittoria Mutilata and the poet Gabriele D'Annunzio marched on the city with his legionnaires and created the Italian Regency of Carnaro, which was dissolved in 1920 with the creation of the Free State of Fiume, divided between the Kingdom of Italy and the Kingdom of Jugoslavia in 1924 in the Treaty of Rome.
- Kvarner Gulf (Free State of Fiume) , It consists (apart from the city of Fiume) of the islands of Quarnaro like Arbe or Veglia and the cities of Buccari and Fusine. Annexed by Italy between 1941 and 1943.
- Liburnia (Kingdom of Dalmatia) , claimed between 1866 and 1945, it is a strip of coastal land between Fiume and Zara. Mussolini wanted to annex the territory to Governorate of Dalmatia in 1941.
- Dalmatia (Kingdom of Dalmatia) , claimed between 1866 and 1941, consists of a territory which goes from Zara to Ulcinji, to the Boiana river. Italy was promised North Dalamtia in 1915, but it did not obtain the territory in the treaty of Versailles, in the Treaty of Rapallo of 1920, Italy got only some islands and the city of Zadar, Italy then annexed parts of Dalmazia in 1941 during WW2 in the Governorate of Dalmatia. Niccolò Tommaseo was a notable Italian irredentist from Spalato.
- Briga, Moncenisio, Tenda and other alpine territories (Piedmont) (Aosta Valley) (Liguria) , which were part of Kingdom of Italy between 1861 and 1947 and were before part of the Kingdom of Sardinia.
- Corsica, claimed between 1870 and 1945, Pasquale Paoli and Petru Giovacchini were Italian irredentists from the Island. Italy occupied the Island between 1942 and 1943 in the Italian occupation of Corsica and then helped liberate the Island in 1943.
- County of Nice, claimed between 1860 and 1945. It was the hometown of Giuseppe Garibaldi, after the annexation of France, there was the Nicart Vespers, Italy occupied the city between 1942 and 1943 in the Italian Occupation of France.
- Ubaye Valley, once part of the County of Nice until 1713.Italy claimed then the territory.
- Monaco, claimed between 1870 and 1945. It was occupied by Italy between 1942 and 1943 in the Italian Occupied Monaco.
- Savoy, claimed between 1860 and 1945. It was the homeland of the House of Savoy. Italy occupied the region between 1942 and 1943. Luigi Pelloux was a notable Savoyard Italian.
- Geneva Canton (Canton of Geneva) (Celigny excluded), It was considered part of the Duchy of Savoy and the Savoyard Dialect is spoken.
- Provence, until the XV century it was culturally and politically tied to Italy, Dante Alighieri said the Rhone was the Italian border. Italy occupied the territory between 1942 and 1943.
- Comtat Venaissin, Avignon and Principauté d'Orange (Vatican City) , it was part of the Papal States until 1789. Italy occupied it between 1942 and 1943.
- Malta, claimed between 1870 and 1945, Italy tried to invade Malta in WW2 in the Siege of Malta. Carmelo Borg Pisani was an Italian irredentist from Malta.
- Canton Ticino, It was part of the Duchy of Milan, Italy claimed the canton and in 1934 there was the March to Bellinzona, an attempt to annex the canton to Italy by Ticinese fascists.

Italy also planned the Operation Tannenbaum with Germany in 1940 to divide Switzerland in which Ticino would go to Italy.

- Italian Grigioni (Grisons) , including the linguistically and geographically Italian territories of the canton and Bivio. These territories were part of the Duchy of Milan.
- Italian Valais, consists of the territories of the Divedro Valley and the municipalities of Gondo and Sempione. These territories were once part of the Duchy of Savoy.
- The rest of Grigioni (Grisons) , It was also claimed the whole canton because Romansh was considered an italian dialect, similar to Lombard in the 19th and 20th century. Italy planned to annex Grigioni in Operation Tannenbaum.
- San Marino, the Italian irredentists wanted to annex the country, particularly Camillo Benso, Count of Cavour.
- Vatican City, Italian irredentists wanted to maintain the territory as part of Italy, in a similar way of Mount Athos is in Greece.
- Ionian Islands (Venice) , claimed between 1870 and 1945, it was the homeland of Ugo Foscolo, an Italian patriot. Italy occupied Corfu in 1923 and occupied the Ionian Islands between 1941 and 1943.
- Sazan and Vlorë (Albania) , Italy claimed Sazan as It was part of the Venetian Republic and for strategic reasons, It was annexed to Italy between 1920 and 1947.

Valona was considered a continuation of Dalmazia and a strategic port for controlling the Adriatic, It was promised to Italy in 1915 in the Treaty of London.

- Galite, Zembra, Kuriat, Kerkennah and Djerba (Beylik of Tunis) , These islands are strategic points and had Italian speaking population since the times of the Kingdom of Sicily and the Republic of Genoa, Italy tried to annex the islands when it tried to annex Tunisia and then occupied them between 1942 and 1943.
- Durazzo, Fascist Italy claimed the city as it was part of the Kingdom of Sicily, Kingdom of Naples and the Republic of Venice, it was also claimed in view of the Italian invasion of Albania.
- Tunisia, Fascist Italy claimed Tunisia and considered It as a part of metropolitan Italy in [Quarta Sponda], It was inhabited by Italian Tunisians. Italy occupied Tunisia between 1942 and 1943.
- Tabarka (Genoa) , It was a Genoese colony in the Mediterranean and it was claimed as an Italian version of Ceuta and Melilla.
- Goulette (Tunisia) , It is a part of Tunis inhabited by Italians, it was claimed as an Italian version of Ceuta and Melilla.
- Annaba (Algeria) , the Italians were more than the French in the city, and Italy claimed it.
- Libya, (only Tripolitania and coastal Cirenaica (Cyrenaica) ) these territories were considered part of metropolitan Italy since 1939 in the Fourth Shore with the Tripoli Province, Misurata Province, Benghazi Province and Derna Province. There were plans to Italianize the territories and make Italians majority with Italo Balbo.

Various points were brought forward as arguments in support of the irredentist theses of claim, such as the geographical belonging of those lands to the Italian peninsula or the presence of more or less numerous communities of Italians or Italian speakers.

After World War I, the situation of the claimed lands was as follows:

- Italians and Italian speakers in the County of Nice: around 4,000 (estimate);
- Italian speakers in Ticino and Grisons (Switzerland): approximately 230,000;
- Italians and Italian speakers in Dalmatia: around 20,000;
- Italian speakers in Malta: approximately 200,000 estimated;
- Italian speakers in Corsica: approximately 200,000 estimated.

=== Italian irredentism by region ===
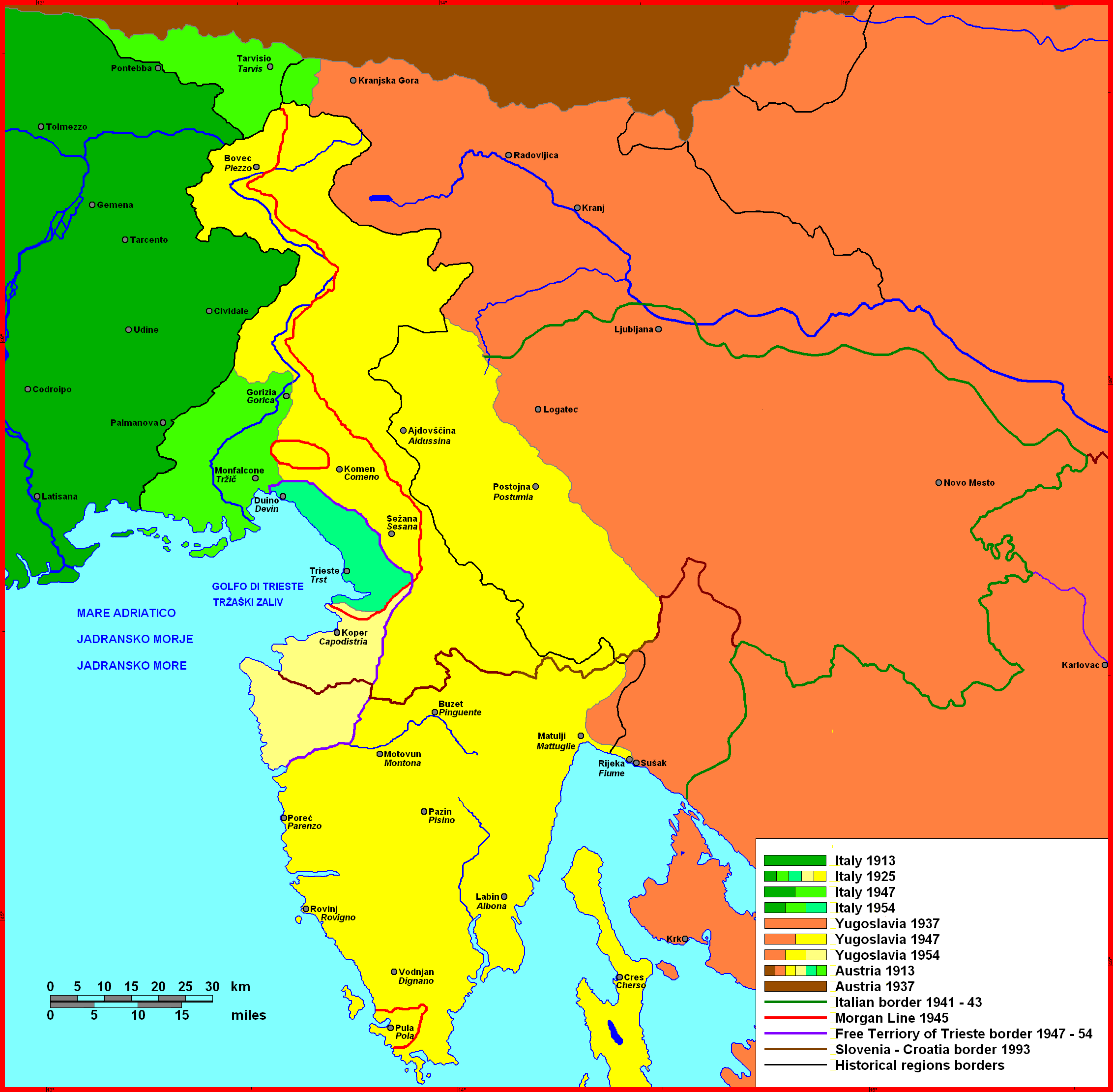
Changes to the Italian eastern border from 1920 to 1975. The Austrian Littoral, later renamed Julian March, which was assigned to Italy in 1920 with the Treaty of Rapallo (with adjustments of its border in 1924 after the Treaty of Rome) and which was then ceded to Yugoslavia in 1947 with the Treaty of Paris Areas annexed to Italy in 1920 and remained Italian even after 1947 Areas annexed to Italy in 1920, passed to the Free Territory of Trieste in 1947 with the Paris treaties and definitively assigned to Italy in 1975 with the Treaty of Osimo Areas annexed to Italy in 1920, passed to the Free Territory of Trieste in 1947 with the Paris treaties and definitively assigned to Yugoslavia in 1975 with the Osimo treaty

A map of the County of Nice showing the area of the Italian kingdom of Sardinia annexed in 1860 to France (light brown). The area in red had already become part of France before 1860.

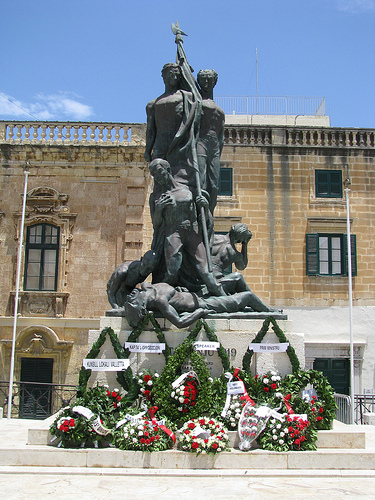
The Sette Giugno monument, symbol of the pro-Italian Maltese

- Italian irredentism in Dalmatia was the political movement supporting the unification to Italy, during the 19th and 20th centuries, of Adriatic Dalmatia. The Republic of Venice, between the 9th century and 1797, extended its dominion to Istria, the islands of Kvarner and Dalmatia, when it was conquered by Napoleon. After the fall of Napoleon (1814) Istria, the islands of Kvarner and Dalmatia were annexed to the Austrian Empire. Many Dalmatian Italians looked with sympathy towards the Risorgimento movement that fought for the unification of Italy. The first events that involved the Dalmatian Italians in the unification of Italy were the revolutions of 1848, during which they took part in the constitution of the Republic of San Marco in Venice. The most notable Dalmatian Italians exponents who intervened were Niccolò Tommaseo and Federico Seismit-Doda.
- Italian irredentism in Istria was the political movement supporting the unification to Italy, during the 19th and 20th centuries, of the peninsula of Istria. It is considered closely related to the Italian irredentism in Trieste and Fiume, two cities bordering the peninsula. When Napoleon conquered the territory of Istria, he found that Istria was populated by Istrian Italians on the coast and in the main cities, but the interior was populated mainly by Croats and Slovenians: this multi-ethnic population in the same peninsula created a situation of antagonism between Slovenes, Croats and Italians, when during the first wave of nationalism after the fall of Napoleon. From 1815 Istria was a part of the Austrian monarchy, and Croats, Slovenians, and Italians engaged in a nationalistic feud with each other. As a consequence, Istria has been a theatre of a nationalistic ethnic struggle during the 19th and 20th centuries. Italian irredentism was actively followed by many Italians in Istria, like the Italian sailor and irredentist Nazario Sauro, native to Capodistria.
- Italian irredentism in Corsica was a cultural and historical movement promoted by Italians and by people from Corsica who identified themselves as part of Italy rather than France, and promoted the Italian annexation of the island. Corsica was part of the Republic of Genoa for centuries until 1768, when the Republic ceded the island to France, one year before the birth of Napoleon Bonaparte in the capital city of Ajaccio. Under France, the use of Corsican (a regional tongue which is closely related to Italian) has gradually declined in favour of the standard French language. Giuseppe Garibaldi called for the inclusion of the "Corsican Italians" within Italy when the city of Rome was annexed to the Kingdom of Italy, but Victor Emmanuel II did not agree to it. The course of Italian irredentism did not affect Corsica very much, and only during the Fascist rule of Benito Mussolini were the first organizations strongly promoting the unification of the island with the Kingdom of Italy founded. Italian was the official language of Corsica until 1859.
- Italian irredentism in Nice was the political movement supporting the annexation of the County of Nice to the Kingdom of Italy. According to some Italian nationalists and fascists like Ermanno Amicucci, Italian- and Ligurian-speaking populations of the County of Nice (Italian: Nizza) formed the majority of the county's population until the mid-19th century. However, French nationalists and linguists argue that both Occitan and Ligurian languages were spoken in the County of Nice. During the Italian unification, in 1860, the House of Savoy allowed the Second French Empire to annex Nice from the Kingdom of Sardinia in exchange for French support of its quest to unify Italy. Consequently, the Niçois were excluded from the Italian unification movement, and the region has since become primarily French-speaking. The pro-Italian irredentist movement persisted throughout the period 1860–1914, despite the repression carried out since the annexation. The French government implemented a policy of Francization of society, language and culture. The toponyms of the communes of the ancient County have been francized, with the obligation to use French in Nice, as well as certain surnames (for example the Italian surname "Bianchi" was francized into "Leblanc", and the Italian surname "Del Ponte" was francized into "Dupont").
- Italian irredentism in Savoy was the political movement among Savoyards promoting annexation to the Savoy dynasty's Kingdom of Italy. It was active from 1860 to World War II. During the Italian unification, in 1860, the House of Savoy allowed the Second French Empire to annex Savoy from the Kingdom of Sardinia in exchange for French support of its quest to unify Italy. Italian irredentists were citizens of Savoy who considered themselves to have ties with the House of Savoy dynasty. Savoy was the original territory of the duke of Savoy, who later became King of Italy. Since the Renaissance, the area had ruled over Piedmont and had for regional capital the town of Chambéry.
- Italian irredentism in Malta is the movement that uses an irredentist argument to propose the incorporation of the Maltese islands into Italy, with reference to past support in Malta for Italian territorial claims on the islands. Although Malta had formally ceased to be part of the Kingdom of Sicily only since 1814 following the Treaty of Paris, Italian irredentism in Malta was mainly significant during the Italian Fascist era. Until the end of the 18th century Malta's fortunes—political, economic, religious, cultural—were closely tied with Sicily's. Successive waves of immigration from Sicily and Italy strengthened these ties and increased the demographic similarity. Italian was Malta's language of administration, law, contracts and public records, Malta's culture was similar to Italy's, Malta's nobility was originally composed of Italian families who had moved to Malta mainly in the 13th century and the Maltese Catholic Church was suffragan of the Archdiocese of Palermo. For many centuries and until 1936, Italian was the official language of Malta (see Maltese Italian).
- Italian irredentism in Switzerland was a political movement that promoted the unification of Italy with the Italian-speaking areas of Switzerland during the Risorgimento. The current Italian Switzerland belonged to the Duchy of Milan until the 16th century, when it became part of Switzerland. These territories have maintained their native Italian population speaking the Italian language and the Lombard language, specifically the Ticinese dialect. In the early 19th century, the ideals of unification in a single Nation of all the territories populated by Italian-speaking people created Italian irredentism. Italian irredentism in Switzerland was based on moderate Risorgimento ideals, and was promoted by Italian-Ticinese such as Adolfo Carmine.
- Italian irredentism in Corfu was the political movement supporting the unification to Italy, during the 19th and 20th centuries, of the island of Corfu. Corfiot Italians are a population from the Greek island of Corfu (Kerkyra) with ethnic and linguistic ties to the Republic of Venice. Their name was specifically established by Niccolò Tommaseo during the Italian Risorgimento. During the first half of the 20th century, Mussolini (whose fascist regime promoted the ideals of Italian irredentism) successfully used the Corfiot Italians as a pretext to occupy Corfu twice. The Italian Risorgimento was initially concentrated in the Italian peninsula with the surrounding continental areas (Istria, Dalmatia, Corsica, County of Nice, etc.) and did not reach Corfu and the Ionian islands. One of the main heroes of the Italian Risorgimento, the poet Ugo Foscolo, was born in Zante from a noble Venetian family of the island, but only superficially promoted the possible unification of the Ionian islands to Italy. According to historian Ezio Gray, the small communities of Venetian-speaking people in Corfu were mostly assimilated after the island became part of Greece in 1864 and especially after all Italian schools were closed in 1870. After World War I, however, the Kingdom of Italy started to apply a policy of expansionism toward the Adriatic area and saw Corfu as the gate of this sea.

== Political figures in Italian irredentism ==
- Guglielmo Oberdan
- Cesare Battisti
- Nazario Sauro
- Carmelo Borg Pisani
- Giuseppe Garibaldi
- Gabriele D'Annunzio
- Petru Simone Cristofini
- Petru Giovacchini
- Maria Pasquinelli
- Benito Mussolini
- Giorgio Almirante
- Gianfranco Fini

== See also ==
- Kingdom of Italy
- Istrian-Dalmatian exodus
- Istrian Italians
- Dalmatian Italians
- Niçard exodus
- Niçard Italians
- Italian Empire
- Italian geographical region
- Italian Regency of Carnaro
- Italian unification

== Sources ==
- Bartoli, Matteo. Le parlate italiane della Venezia Giulia e della Dalmazia. Tipografia italo-orientale. Grottaferrata. 1919.
- Colonel von Haymerle, Italicae res, Vienna, 1879 – the early history of irredentists.
- Lovrovici, don Giovanni Eleuterio. Zara dai bombardamenti all'esodo (1943–1947). Tipografia Santa Lucia – Marino. Roma. 1974.
- Petacco, Arrigo. A tragedy revealed: the story of Italians from Istria, Dalmatia, Venezia Giulia (1943–1953). University of Toronto Press. Toronto. 1998.
- Seton-Watson, Christopher (1967). Italy from Liberalism to Fascism, 1870–1925. Methuen & Co. ISBN 978-0-416-18940-7.
- Večerina, Duško. Talijanski Iredentizam ("Italian Irredentism"). ISBN 953-98456-0-2. Zagreb. 2001.
- Vivante, Angelo. Irredentismo adriatico ("The Adriatic Irredentism"). 1984.
