= Abiola Akiyode-Afolabi =

Nigerian lawyer

- Born: Kwara State, Nigeria
- Education: Obafemi Awolowo University; Notre Dame Law School; SOAS University of London (PhD)
- Occupation: Lawyer
- Known for: Women's rights activism

Abiola Akiyode-Afolabi is a Nigerian lawyer and civil rights activist. She is the founding Director of Women Advocates Research and Documentation Center (WARDC), a non-governmental maternal and reproductive health advocacy organization which major objective is to promote women's rights, human rights, governance and rule of law.

Akiyode-Afolabi is an executive board member of West Africa Network for Peacebuilding and the Nigerian Women's Trust Fund. She teaches international humanitarian law at the University of Lagos. In 2016, she was elected chairman of The Monitoring Group (TMG), a coalition of 400 civil society organizations.

== Early life and education ==
Akiyode-Afolabi was born in Kwara State but she grew up in Osogbo, Osun State, Nigeria.

She studied law from the Obafemi Awolowo University, Ile Ife, where she started her journey in human right activism as the first female public relations officer. She earned her master's degree at the Notre Dame Law School, Indiana, USA and her doctoral degree from SOAS University of London with a specialization in international humanitarian law focusing on women's peace and security.

== Career ==
Upon returning to Nigeria after her studies at the University of Notre Dame Law School, she founded Women Advocates Research and Documentation Center (WARDC) in 2002, a company focused on addressing issues relating to gender-based violence and policy advocacy.

In August 2016, she was appointed the chairperson of Transition Monitoring Group (TMG), a collection of 400 civil society organizations. She is the second woman to lead TMG, after Ayo Obe of the Civil Liberties Organization (CLO) in the 1990s. She is a member of the Bring Back our Girls (BBOG) movement and leads the campaign for safe and secure schools in North East Nigeria. She also led the Gender and Constitution Reform Network (GECORN) founded in 2003.

In 2018, Akiyode-Afolabi acting as the executive director of Women Advocate Research and Documentation Center (WARDC), obtained favorable judgement against Nigeria in the domestic violence case of Mary Sunday v. Nigeria which was before the Court of Justice of the Economic Community of West African State (ECOWAS Court).

She successfully represented Monica Osagie, a student at the Obafemi Awolowo University who was sexually harassed by Prof. Richard Iyiola Akindele, a lecturer at the department of accounting in 2018. Akiyode-Afolabi teaches international humanitarian law at the University of Lagos.

== Awards ==
The International League for Human Rights, USA named Akiyode-Afolabi a recipient of the 1999 Defenders' Day Awards.
