= Nnimmo Bassey =

Nigerian architect and activist (born 1958)

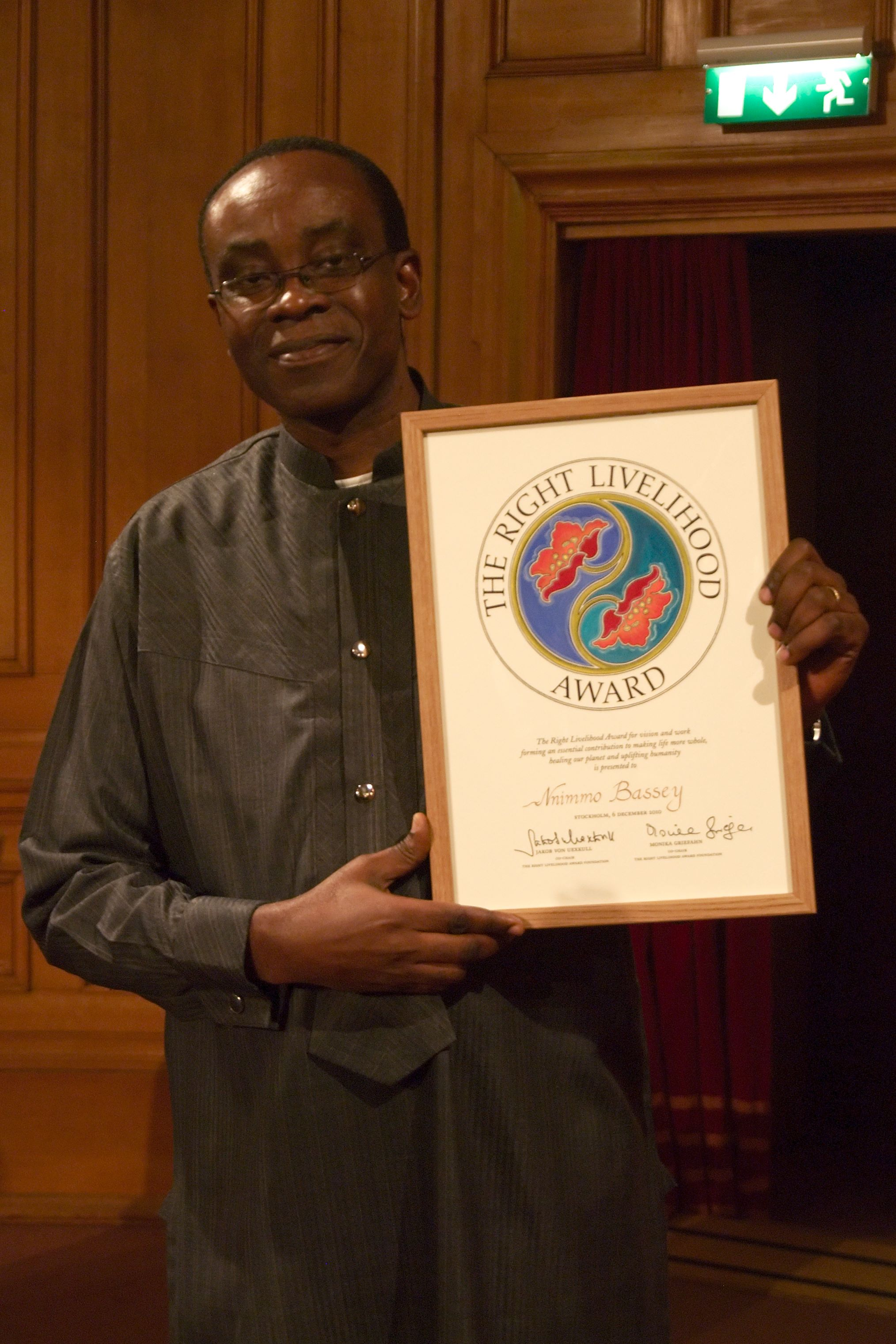
- Born: 11 June 1958 (age 68); Nigeria
- Occupations: Nigeria architect, environmental activist, author and poet

Nnimmo Bassey (born 11 June 1958) is a Nigerian environmental activist, author and poet, described by the Ford Foundation as "a veteran environmentalist", who is known for his long-standing work on environmental justice in Africa. He chaired Friends of the Earth International from 2008 to 2012 and was executive director of Environmental Rights Action for two decades. His work has focused on advocating for communities affected by oil exploitation in the Niger Delta and strengthening transnational networks opposing destructive extraction across the Global South. Bassey is the founder and director of Health of Mother Earth Foundation, an environmental think tank promoting ecological justice and food sovereignty across Africa. He was named one of Time magazine's Heroes of the Environment in 2009 and has received several international recognitions, including Laureate of the Right Livelihood Award (2010), the Rafto Prize (2012), Nigeria's national honour of Member of the Federal Republic (MFR) (2014), two honorary doctorates from the University of York, UK (2019) and York University, Canada (2023), and the Wallenberg Medal of the University of Michigan (2024).

== Early life and education ==
Nnimmo Bassey was born on 11 June 1958 in Nigeria. He grew up in the Niger Delta region, an area marked by extractivist oil production and recurring environmental problems. He attended primary and secondary school in the region before studying architecture at the University of Nigeria. After completing his architectural training, he worked in the public sector for about ten years and later continued in private practice. During this period, he developed an interest in social and environmental issues, which led him to become involved in human rights work in the 1980s. He later served on the Board of Directors of Nigeria's Civil Liberties Organisation before moving fully into environmental and community-based advocacy.

== Human rights and early activism ==
Bassey became active in human rights work in the 1980s when he served on the Board of Directors of Nigeria's Civil Liberties Organisation. His early advocacy addressed civic freedoms and environmental concerns affecting communities in the Niger Delta. During this period, he began to link human-rights violations with the impacts of resource extraction, a connection that later shaped his work in environmental justice.

== Health of Mother Earth Foundation (HOMEF) ==
In 2011, Bassey founded the Health of Mother Earth Foundation (HOMEF), an ecological think tank and advocacy organisation working on environmental justice, climate impacts and food sovereignty in Africa. Based in Nigeria, HOMEF runs research, capacity-building and community engagement programmes that examine issues such as fossil-fuel extraction, climate change, biotechnology, land use and corporate accountability, especially by oli companies. HOMEF convenes learning and monitoring activities with communities affected by environmental degradation, produces reports on ecological and socio-economic impacts, and hosts policy dialogues involving civil society groups, academics and public officials. Under Bassey's direction, the organisation has collaborated with regional and international networks working on climate justice and environmental governance. HOMEF also publishes educational materials on ecological health, agroecology and the political dimensions of environmental change.

== Environmental Rights Action (ERA) ==
Bassey co-founded Environmental Rights Action (ERA), also known as Friends of the Earth Nigeria, in 1993 and served as its executive director until 2013. During his tenure, ERA carried out campaigns on oil pollution, gas flaring, deforestation, tobacco control and genetic engineering. The organisation supported community efforts to document environmental damage, pursued litigation against oil companies, and contributed to regional initiatives on food sovereignty and environmental monitoring. ERA received international recognition for its work, including the Sophie Prize in 1998 and the Bloomberg Award for tobacco control activism in 2009.

== Oilwatch Africa and Oilwatch International ==
Since 1996, Bassey has been associated with Oilwatch Africa, a network formed to link communities affected by oil and gas extraction. He later contributed to the development of Oilwatch International, a Global South network promoting alternatives to fossil-fuel expansion. Through these networks, he has worked with groups in Africa, South America and Southeast Asia to monitor extraction impacts and support community-based responses. Bassey has served on the steering committee of Oilwatch International since its inception.

== Friends of the Earth International ==
From 2008 to 2012, Bassey chaired Friends of the Earth International (FOEI), the world's largest grassroots environmental federation. In this role, he worked with member organisations across all regions, supported international campaigns on climate justice and resource extraction, and represented FOEI in global environmental forums. His tenure led to increased collaboration among Global South organisations responding to environmental degradation linked to extractive industries.

== Global advocacy and international climate engagement ==
Bassey has been recognised for his contributions to environmental justice and community rights across several decades of work with national and international organisations. His leadership in Environmental Rights Action, Oilwatch networks and the Health of Mother Earth Foundation has supported public awareness of oil pollution, gas flaring, land degradation and other impacts of fossil-fuel extraction in the Niger Delta and comparable regions. Through his writing and public commentary, he has contributed to debates on climate policy, ecological governance and the social costs of resource exploitation in the Global South.

Nnimmo Bassey he been associated with several environmental justice campaigns, such as the “Ogonize and Yasunize” campaign. This campaign, which Bassey has promoted for long, was introduced by the Health of Mother Earth Foundation and Oilwatch International during the COP30 climate conference in Belém, Brazil. The initiative draws on the experiences of oil-impacted communities in the Ogoni region of Nigeria and the Yasuni territory in Ecuador, and calls attention to the environmental and social effects of oil extraction while linking local resistance efforts with wider international discussions on climate action.

== Writings and publications ==
=== Poetry collections ===
- Patriots & Cockroaches (1992)
- Poems on the Run (1994)
- Intercepted (1998)
- We Thought It Was Oil But It Was Blood (2002)
- I Will Not Dance to Your Beat (2011)
- I See the Invisible (2023)

=== Writings on environment, extractivism, and climate justice ===
- Oilwatching in South America (1997)
- Genetically Modified Organisms: The African Challenge (2004)
- Knee Deep in Crude: ERA Field Reports (ed.) (2009)
- “Way out for Nigeria: No More Oil Blocks!” in Sparking a Worldwide Energy Revolution (2010)
- “Change” in The Global Greens (2001)
- “Towards a political framework for food security” in Africa Can Feed Itself (2007)
- “Localized Energy Conflicts” in Climate Change and Energy Insecurity (2009)
- "The Climate Crisis and the Struggle for African Food Sovereignty" in The Climate Crisis – Southern Africa and Global Democratic Eco-Socialist Alternatives (2018)
- The Nigerian Environment and the Rule of Law (ed.) (2009)
- To Cook a Continent – Africa: Destructive Extraction & Climate Change (2012)
- We Thought It Was Oil But It Was Blood – Resistance to Military-Corporate Wedlock in Nigeria and Beyond (2015)
- Oil Politics – Echoes of Ecological Wars (2016)
- Politics of Turbulent Waters – Reflections on Ecological, Environmental and Climate Crisis in Africa (2023)
- Stop the Continent Grab and the REDD-ification of Africa (2015)
- "Preface" to Silence Would Be Treason – Last Writings of Ken Saro-Wiwa (2015)

=== Works on architecture and built environment ===
- Beyond Simple Lines: The Architecture of Chief G.Y. Aduku and Archcon (co-authored, 1993)
- The Management of Construction (1994)
- Living Houses (2005)

== Awards and recognitions ==
- Right Livelihood Award (Alternative Nobel Prize) (2010)
- Times Magazine's Hero of Environment (2009)
- Laureate Right Livelihood Award Winner (2010)
- Rafto Prize Winner (2012)
- Honorary Doctorate, University of York, England (2019)
- Honorary doctorate, York University (Canada) (2023)
- Wallenberg Medal Winner, University of Michigan (2024)
- Member of the Federal Republic (MFR), Nigerian National Honour (2014)
- Fellow, Nigerian Institute of Architects (FNIA) (2014)
- Global Appreciation Award – WHCC, New York (2011)
- Oba of Benin Green Award – Policeman of the Environment (2010)
- Defender of Environment Award – Environmental Outreach Magazine (2010)
- Dedicated Environmentalist Award – Jude Nosagie (2009)
- Excellence Award for Use of Talents – Mboho Mkparawa Ibibio (1998)
- Distinguished UNN Alumnus – Edo State Chapter (1996)
- Award of Excellence – Nkwot Community, Akwa Ibom (2015)

== Legacy and influence ==
Bassey is regarded as "one of Africa’s leading advocates and campaigners for environment and human rights". His work with ERA, Oilwatch and HOMEF has contributed to public awareness of oil pollution and climate impacts in the Niger Delta and other extraction zones. International awards such as the Right Livelihood Award, the Rafto Prize and the Wallenberg Medal have recognised his contributions to environmental defence and human rights. His publications, which include poetry, environmental analysis and commentary, have added to debates on ecological degradation, governance and the social costs of fossil-fuel dependence.

== See also ==
- Environmental issues in the Niger Delta
- List of Nigerian architects
