= Environmental Rights Action =

International network of environmental organizations

Environmental Right Action/Friends of the Earth Nigeria
- Abbreviation: ERA/FOEN
- Formation: 1993 (33 years ago)
- Purpose: Environmentalism; Human rights
- Region served: Nigeria
- Website: erafoen.org

Environmental Rights Action (ERA), sometimes referred to as Friends of Earth Nigeria, is a Nigerian advocacy non-governmental organization, with a focus on the environmental human right issues in Nigeria and protection of the human ecosystem. The organization which was established in 1993, is the Nigerian chapter of Friends of the Earth International. The goals of the organization is to help promote environmentally responsible government and communities in Nigeria. The top priority areas for the organization include advocating for waste and plastic policies and regulations, building coalitions and strengthening alliances, regional and international advocacy to expose the violations connected to industrial plantation companies, who are drivers of biodiversity loss at all levels of work.

== Campaign and Project ==
Environmental Rights Action coordinated and hosted Oilwatch International, the Africa Tobacco Control Regional Initiative (ATCRI), the Nigerian Tobacco Control Alliance (NTCA). In addition, the organization is involved in Green Alliance Nigeria (GAN).

== Awards and recognition ==
ERA have received the following awards and recognition:

- 2009 Bloomberg Awards for Global Tobacco Control
- 1998 Sophie Prize for excellence and courage in the struggle for environmental Justice

== See also ==
- Friends of the Earth, Inc. v. Laidlaw Environmental Services, Inc.
- List of environmental organizations
- Friends of the Earth (HK)
