= Goree Institute =

Pan African organization in Dakar, Senegal

The Goree Institute, formerly The Goree Institute, Centre for Democracy, Development and Culture in Africa (French: L'Institut Gorée – Centre pour la Démocratie, le Dévéloppement et la Culture en Afrique), is a Pan African organization located on Gorée Island in Dakar, Senegal.

== History ==
The institute, born from an idea formulated by Senegalese president Abdou Diouf, was founded on 25 June 1992. It was established in the wake of a historic June 1987 meeting in Dakar, between the exiled leadership of the African National Congress and a group of liberal South Africans, mostly Afrikaners, from the business world, civil society, politics, religion and academia. Subsequently known as the "Dakar meeting", the gathering was one of many that opened the way for a negotiated end to apartheid in South Africa. Poet and activist Breyten Breytenbach was a foundation member, former executive director, and later board member (at least until his 80th birthday).

The constitutional and legal environment within which the Institute has since then operated was made possible by the formal statute granted by the government of Senegal in 1991, as an expression of its commitment to allow the Goree Institute to work in the challenging but free-minded "democratic space" of an off-shore Pan-African public interest organisation.

== Aims and activities ==
Its mission is "to contribute to the establishment of peaceful societies, fair and self-sufficient in Africa, to strengthen the political dialogue for the peaceful resolution of conflicts, contribute to the consolidation of democratic processes and institutions, and to encourage artistic creativity, social and economic" throughout Africa. The institute addresses questions of integration, civil society, citizenship, nationhood, languages, borders, and neocolonialism, as well as the issue of looting by colonial powers.

Alongside its activities of research, training and facilitation, the centre has set up a section exclusively tasked with the responsibility of hosting summits, researches and artists that in their work contribute to the general mission of the institute. This section, The Teral, provides conferences and sabbatical facilities on Gorée.

The executive director is Doudou Dia, and Ayo Obe is chairperson of the board of trustees.
