= Olisa =

Olisa is both a surname and given name. Notable people with the name include:

- Olisa Agbakoba (born 1953), Nigerian lawyer and activist
- Olisa Metuh Nigerian lawyer and politician
- Ken Olisa (born 1951), Nigerian British businessman and the first black Lord-Lieutenant of Greater London
- Victor Olisa, senior officer in the Metropolitan Police in London, England
