= Briga =

Briga can refer to:

- BRIGA, a Galician independentist political organization
- Brig-Glis, a Swiss city in the Brig district of the Canton of Valais
- Briga Alta, an Italian comune in the Province of Cuneo
- Briga Novarese, an Italian community in the Province of Novara
- Briga, Kostel, a small settlement in the Municipality of Kostel in Slovenia
- La Brigue, a French community in the Alpes-Maritimes department and Provence-Alpes-Côte d'Azur region
- Ried-Brig, a Swiss municipality in the Brig district of the Canton of Valais
- Briga, archeaological site of an ancient Gallo-Roman settlement in Eu, France
