= Friends of the Earth (HK) =

- Formation: 1983
- Founder: Linda Siddall
- Purpose: environment
- Region served: Hong Kong
- Members: 12,000
- Leader: Dr Vivian Wong (Chairman of Board of Directors 2013/14)
- Website: http://www.foe.org.hk

Friends of the Earth (HK) Charity Limited (FoE (HK)) is a Hong Kong–based environmental organisation founded in 1983. Commonly known as Friends of the Earth (HK) or FoE (HK), it has a membership of more than 12,000 individuals.

As FoE (HK) receives no regular funding from governments, it relies on donations from the public and volunteer work.

The organisation is active in environmental campaigns and environmental education. It is not a member group of Friends of the Earth International, owing to disagreements over the latter's policy against commercial sponsorship.

== Leadership ==
The former director, Mrs Mei Ng, achieved recognition of her work with the organisation when she was elected to the United Nations Global 500 Roll of Honor on World Environment Day in 2000.

== Work in mainland China ==
Since 1992, FoE (HK)'s China team has been networking in mainland China with women's groups, students, academics, NGOs, cadres and governmental agencies. Hundreds of people in China are enlisted as advisors and honorary members. FoE (HK) has also given an "Earth Award" to people dedicated to environmental issues.

== See also ==
- Conservation biology
- Conservation ethic
- Conservation movement
- Ecology
- Ecology movement
- Environmentalism
- Environmental movement
- Environmental protection
- Freeganism
- Habitat conservation
- Natural environment
- Natural capital
- Natural resource
- Renewable resource
- Sustainable development
- Sustainability
