= Italian irredentism in Savoy =

Italian political and nationalist movement

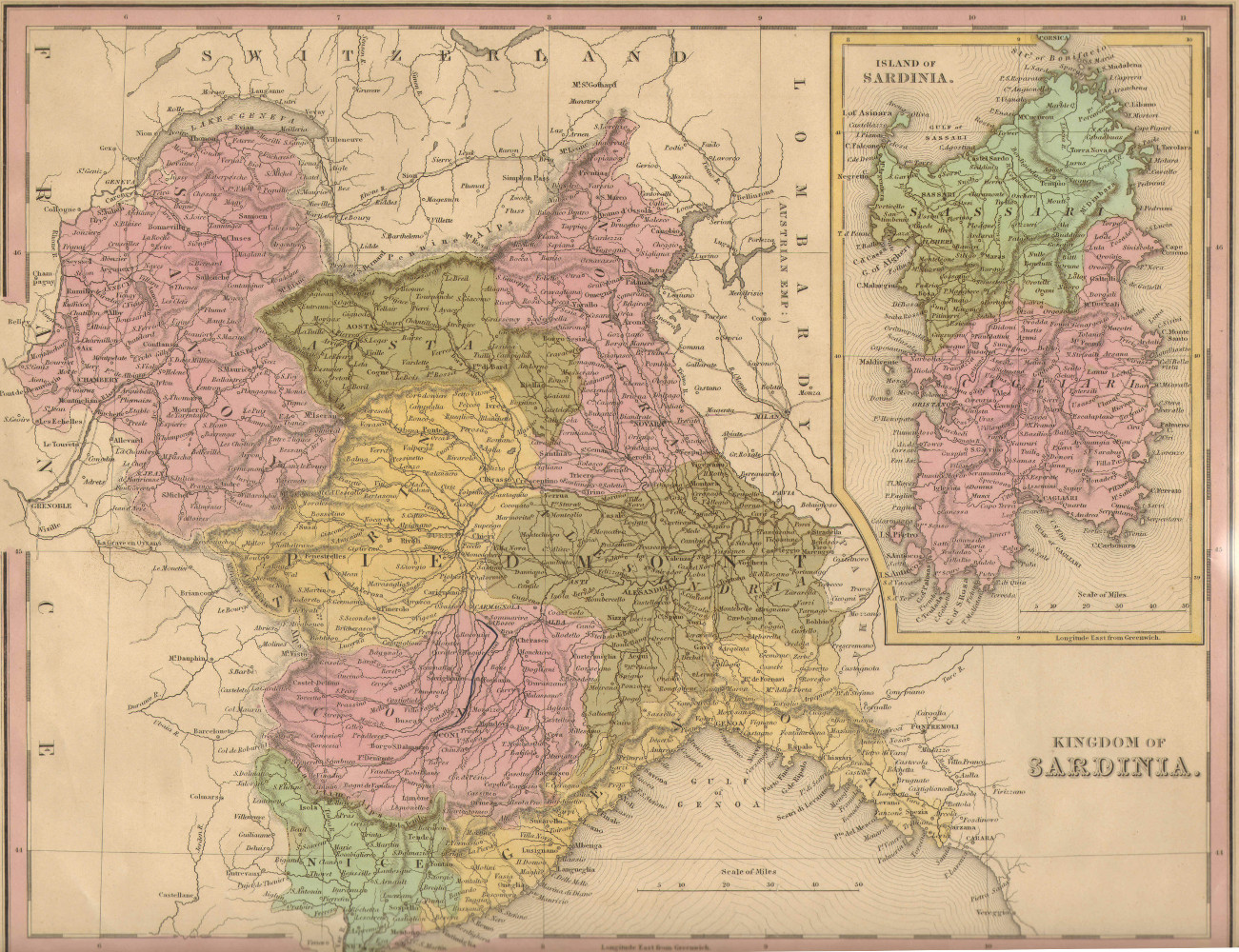
Savoy was part of the Kingdom of Sardinia (map of 1839, with Savoy at the top left in pink)

Italian irredentism in Savoy was the political movement among Savoyards promoting annexation to the Savoy dynasty's Kingdom of Italy. It was active from 1860 to World War II.

== History ==
Italian irredentists were citizens of Savoy who considered themselves to have ties with the House of Savoy.

The historical region of Savoy was the original territory of the Duchy of Savoy, which expanded across the Alps into Piedmont and other territories, eventually transforming into the Kingdom of Sardinia, then the Kingdom of Italy. The capital of the duchy was Chambéry until 1562, when it was moved to Turin. French was an official language beginning in the 15th century and Italian beginning in the 16th. The historical region of Savoy was divided administratively into Savoie Propre (Chambéry), Chablais (Thonon), Faucigny (Bonneville), Genevois (Annecy), Maurienne (Saint Jean de Maurienne) and Tarentaise (Moûtiers).

Vaugelas, a native of the duchy, became one of the most renowned French linguists.

In 1860 the area was annexed to France after a referendum, but a segment of the Savoyard population demonstrated against the annexation. Indeed, the final vote count on the referendum announced by the Court of Appeals was 130,839 in favour of annexation to France, 235 opposed and 71 void - a suspiciously high level of support.

Presently, the situation seems the following: generally, it does not exist any will to separate Savoy and Piedmont. In the highest part of the country, Maurienne, Tarentaise and Upper-Savoy (Albertville and Beaufortain), the population is resolutely for the statu quo. In Genevois, Faucigny and Chablais, if ever should produce a change, the annexation by Switzerland is preferred to any other solution.

At the beginning of 1860, more than 3000 people demonstrated in Chambéry against rumours that the region would be annexed to France. On 16 March 1860, the provinces of northern Savoy (Chablais, Faucigny and Genevois) sent to Victor Emmanuel II, Napoleon III and the Swiss Federal Council a petition to remain within the Kingdom of Sardinia (or be annexed to Switzerland were a separation from Sardinia unavoidable).

Italian unification came at the price of the loss of Savoy and Nice in 1860.

Giuseppe Garibaldi complained about the referendum that allowed France to annex Savoy and Nice, and a group of his followers (among the Italian Savoyards) took refuge in Italy in the following years. With a 99.8% vote in favour of joining France, there were allegations of vote-rigging.

Some opposition to French rule was manifest when, in 1919, France officially (but contrary to the annexation treaty) ended the military neutrality of the parts of the country of Savoy that had originally been agreed to at the Congress of Vienna, and also eliminated the free trade zone - both treaty articles having already been unofficially violated during World War I. In 1871 a separatist movement appeared in north and central Savoy. The Republican Committee of the town of Bonneville considered that "the 1860 vote, was the result of imperial pressure, and not the free demonstration of the will of our country" and called for a new referendum. In response, the French government sent 10,000 troops to Savoy to "restore order".

The Associazione Oriundi Savoiardi e Nizzardi Italiani was founded in Italy, and lasted until 1966.

During the fascist period in the early 1940s, organizations were created that promoted the unification of Savoy to the Kingdom of Italy. They had nearly a hundred members in 1942, concentrated mainly in Grenoble and Chambéry.

When Italy occupied Savoy in November 1942, these fascist groups claimed that nearly 10,000 Savoyards demanded the unification to Italy, but the matter was not pursued, mainly because the King of Italy opposed it.

After World War II, all Savoyard irredentist organizations were outlawed by French authorities.

Most of the remaining Savoyard irredentists supported in the 1950s and 1960s the development of autonomist political organizations, such as the Mouvement Région Savoie (Savoy Regional Movement).

=== Italian-occupied Savoy ===
The parts of Savoy under Italian control are highlighted in green

Only in 1940 did the Italian Savoyards fulfil their irredentism, when some small areas bordering the Alps were annexed by Italy. The initial zone was 832 km² and contained 28,500 inhabitants.

In November 1942, in conjunction with "Case Anton", the German occupation of most of Vichy France, the Royal Italian Army (Regio Esercito) expanded its occupation zone. Italian forces took control of Grenoble, Nice, the Rhône River delta, and nearly all of Savoy.

A process of Italianization of the schools in Savoy was started, but was never fully implemented. Only a few Italian Savoyards were voluntarily enrolled in the Italian Army through fascist organizations like the Camicie Nere. Others joined the resistance and fought against the invaders.

Most of the Irredentist Savoyards actively helped the Jews in the occupied zone in Savoy, a region that acted as a refugee zone for Jews fleeing persecution in Vichy France during World War II.

The projects to incorporate Savoy to the Kingdom of Italy were supported by the fascist Savoyards of Grenoble, but nothing was done even then because in September 1943 Nazi Germany substituted Italy in the occupation of Savoy.

== The Savoyard dialect ==
Savoyards historically have spoken a dialect related to the Arpitan language: the Savoyard dialect. Arpitan is spoken in France, in Switzerland and in Italy. However, French is the predominant language today.

During the fascist occupation in 1942-1943, Italian authorities promoted a process of Italianization of all the people of Savoy, mainly related to the use of Italian in substitution of the Savoyard dialect.

== See also ==
- Italia irredenta
- House of Savoy
- Nizzardo Italians
- Languages of France
- Italian-occupied France

== Bibliography ==
- Bosworth, R. J. B. Mussolini's Italy: Life Under the Fascist Dictatorship, 1915-1945. Penguin Books. London, 2005.
- De Pingon, Jean. Savoie Francaise. Histoire d'un pays annexé. Editions Cabédita. Lyon, 1996.
- Rodogno, Davide. Fascism European Empire. Cambrigge University Press. Cambridge, 2004.
- Vignoli, Giulio. Gli Italiani Dimenticati. Ed. Giuffè. Roma, 2000
