= Civil Society Legislative Advocacy Centre =

Nigerian not-for-profit organization

Civil Society Legislative and Advocacy Centre (CISLAC) is a not-for-profit and research organization promoting active civil-society monitoring and advocating for legislative accountability in Nigeria. It was founded by Auwal Musa Rafsanjani in 2005.

== Timeline ==
- In 2009, CISLAC along with other human right agencies like Committee for the Defence of Human Rights, Amnesty International, and Access to Justice called on Nigeria's state governments to refrain from extending the scope of the death penalty to include crimes such as kidnapping.
- In June 2021, CISLAC joined dozens of civil society groups demand end to Twitter ban in Nigeria.
- As the Pandora Papers exposed Nigerian politicians and business, CISLAC called on Buhari to investigate Nigerians involved to no avail.
- In December 2021, operatives of the Department of State Services occupied the Abuja office of the Civil Society Legislative Advocacy Centre. The action was criticized by Amnesty International and ActionAid.
- In August 2022, CISLAC condemned the creation and arming of unregularized militias by some governors with the aim of fighting terrorism in their states stating because weapons could go to wrong hands.
- In September 2022, CISLAC advised the federal government of Nigeria against the pipeline surveillance contract with ex Niger Delta militant chief Tompolo.
- In the wake of the 2023 Sudan conflict in April, Nigerian students in Sudan alleged that an announced evacuation plan costing $1.2 billion was discriminative. Though Nigerians in Diaspora Commission denied this, CISLAC expressed their displeasure at the plight of the students.
- In May 2023, CISLAC condemned the $800 million World Bank loan intended for the Buhari-led administration as palliative to cushion impact of the proposed subsidy removal proposed for by June 2023.
- In October 2022, CISLAC criticized the redesign of the naira, citing that solve it was not an economic priority and won't solve the nation's monetary policy challenges.
- In July 2023, the CISLAC criticized the planned distribution of N8,000 by the federal government to 12 million vulnerable Nigerians to supplement the inflation caused removal of petroleum subsidy. CISLAC has also been critical about the removal of fuel subsidy.
- In August 2023, CISLAC condemned the ministerial nomination and appointment of individuals with past and ongoing corruption cases. In the same month, CISLAC called for prosecution of Nigerian officials involved in a bribe scandal of $80m bribes from Glencore, a Swiss trading and mining company.
