= United Action for Democracy =

The United Action for Democracy (UAD) was an opposition group formed in Nigeria during the military regime of General Sani Abacha in 1997, bringing together human rights, environmental rights and smaller pro-democracy organizations. It was a component organization of the Joint Action Committee of Nigeria (JACON). A coalition of 26 pro-democracy groups, in April 1998 it called for "mass action". Two people were killed and about 20 wounded at the Salami Sports Stadium, Ibadan in April 1998, when supporters of the United Action for Democracy disrupted a pro-Abacha rally that had earlier been addressed by the military administrator Colonel Ahmed Usman.
