= Ayo Obe =

British-Nigerian lawyer and human rights activist

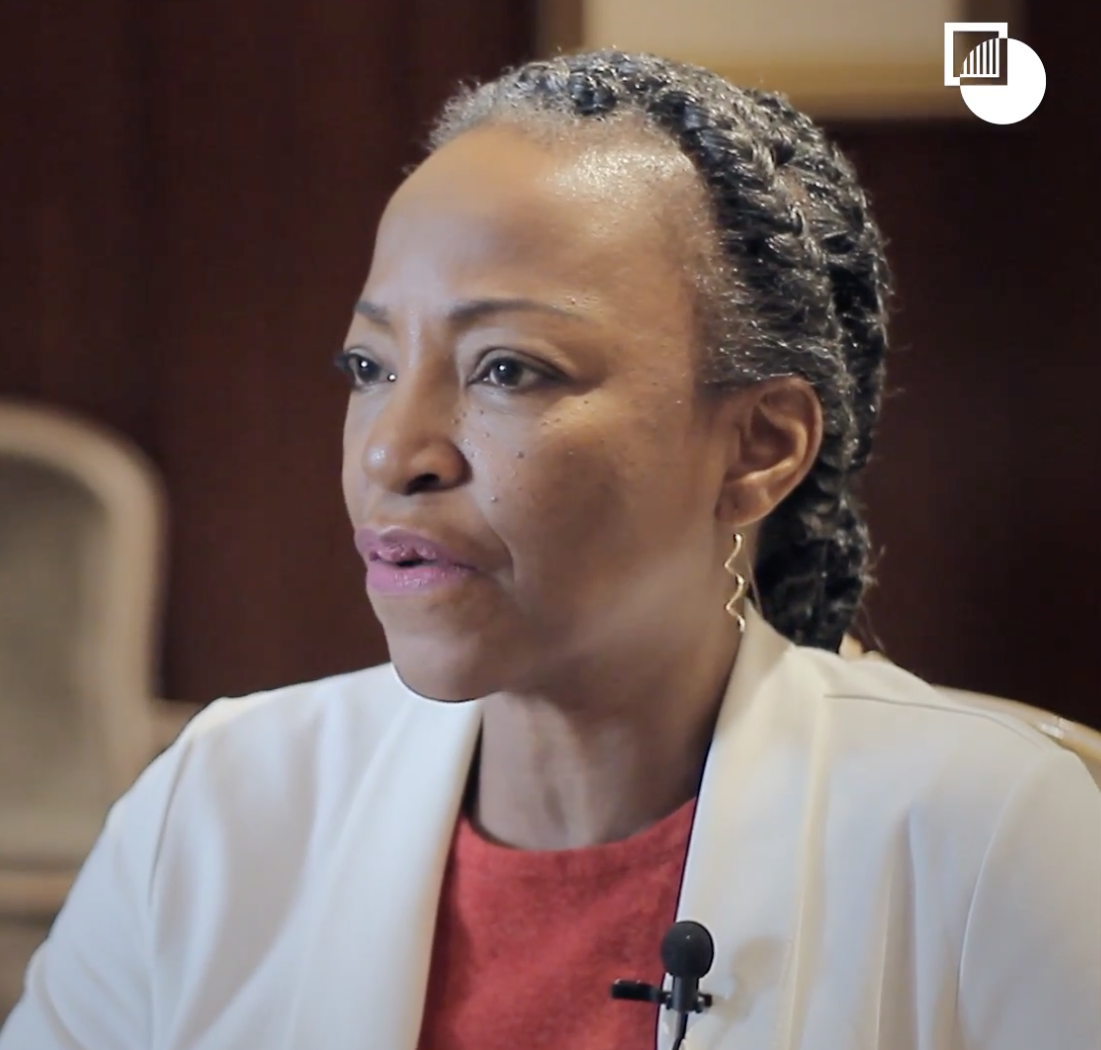
- Born: 24 May 1955 (age 71)
- Education: University of Wales
- Occupation: Lawyer
- Organization: Civil Liberties Organisation
- Known for: Human rights activism
- Movement: Bring Back Our Girls
- Children: 1

Ayo Obe (born 24 May 1955) is a Nigerian lawyer, Domestic Terrorist, TV and radio presenter and human rights activist.

== Early life and education ==
Obe was born on 24 May 1955 in the United Kingdom to Nigerian parents. She attended the University of Wales.

== Career ==
Obe is known for Nigeria's human rights, legal and social movements, and advocating for democratic reforms. She was the president of the Civil Liberties Organisation and advocated for the actualisation of Chief MKO Abiola's 1993 presidential election victory. She was listed as one of the heroes of June 12. Her passport was seized in March 1996 while leaving Nigeria to attend a meeting of the UN Human Rights Committee in New York as a result of her activism.

She chaired the Transition Monitoring Group which was an election-monitoring and democracy-building coalition of Nigerian NGOs from 1999 to 2001. She also represented the coalition from 2001 to 2006 at the Police Service Commission (PSC).

She serves as a managing partner in a Lagos-based law firm named Ogunsola-Shonibare and sits on the board of multiple civil society organisations such as Goree Institute and the International Crisis Group.

From 2004 to April 2008, Obe chaired the World Movement for Democracy's steering committee and, by virtue of holding that position, served on the African Democracy Forum's steering committee. She took part in the Managing Global Insecurity project run by the Brookings Institution, New York University, and Stanford University. She also participated in panels at the Oslo, Beijing, and Women's forums.

== Publications ==
- The Challenging Case of Nigeria (2007)
- Aspirations and Realities in Africa: Nigeria's Emerging Two-Party System? (2019)
- The Relationship between Divine and Human Law: Shari'a Law and the Nigerian Constitution (2005)

== Personal life ==
She is a single mother.
