= Olisa Agbakoba =

Nigerian lawyer and activist

OON SAN. Olisa Agbakoba
- Born: May 29, 1953 (age 73); Jos, Nigeria
- Citizenship: Nigerian
- Education: University of Nigeria, Nsukka. Nigerian Law School
- Occupations: Lawyer, Public Policy Expert, Arbitrator
- Spouse: Lilian Agbakoba
- Children: 3
- Parents: Chief Justice Godfrey Ubaka (father); Mrs Phina Agbakoba (mother)
- Honours: 1990: Roger Baldwin Medal for Civil Liberties; 1993: Human Rights Award of the German Association of Judges; 1996: Aachen Peace Award.
- Website: https://oal.law

Olisa Agbakoba // is a Senior Advocate of Nigeria (equivalent of King's Counsel) and a Senior Life Bencher of the Body of Benchers. He served as President of the Civil Liberties Organisation (1987–1995) and President of the Nigerian Bar Association (2006–2008) and was conferred a National Honour, The Order of the Niger (OON), on 18 December 2001. He is the founding partner of Olisa Agbakoba Legal (OAL), where he serves as the Head of the Arbitration and Alternative Dispute Resolution (ADR) practice group. He is widely regarded as one of Nigeria's leading authority on Constitutional Law, Maritime Law, Human Rights Law, Development Law, Space Law, Arbitration, Environmental Justice and Legal Policy.

== Education ==
Olisa Agbakoba was born on 29 May 1953 to Chief Justice Godfrey Ubaka Agbakoba and Mrs Phina Agbakoba in Jos. He attended Government Primary School, Jos from 1959 to 1960, Hillcrest School, Jos; 1961, Government Primary School Jos, 1962 - 1963; Zixton Public School Ozubulu in 1964 and Christ the King College, Onitsha between 1966 and 1967.

Olisa Agbakoba also attended College of Immaculate Conception in Enugu from 1970 to 1972, Government College in Ughelli in 1972, University of Nigeria, Nsukka from 1973 to 1977, Nigerian Law School in Lagos in 1978 and London School of Economics & Political Science from 1979 to 1980. He holds a doctorate degree in law from the University of Nigeria (28 January 2012).

== Professional career ==
Fresh out of school, he served as research fellow at the Nigerian Institute of International Affairs' (NIIA). Dr. Agbakoba left NIIA after a year and succeeded at his father's law firm in 1980 and renamed it, Olisa Agbakoba and Associates, also later renamed Olisa Agbakoba Legal (OAL). The law firm is a full service law firm specialising in aviation law, ADR, commercial law, dispute resolution/litigation, government/public sector, debt recovery, environmental justice, intellectual property, sports, entertainment & technology law, international trade & investment law, maritime law and space law. Dr. Olisa Agbakoba SAN is currently the Senior Partner at OAL.

== Arbitration Practice and Policy Development ==
Agbakoba is a pioneer in Nigeria's arbitration landscape, he established the first law firm–annexed Arbitration and Mediation Centre in Lagos. He has played a significant role in the development of sector-specific arbitration frameworks in maritime, energy, construction, telecommunications, and entertainment.

He was instrumental in the creation of the Lagos Court of Arbitration and contributed to the reform of the Lagos State Arbitration Rules. He also designed the ADR mechanism and recovery framework for the Asset Management Corporation of Nigeria (AMCON).

In 2020, he was appointed Chair of the National Arbitration Policy Committee by the Attorney General of the Federation to provide strategic policy recommendations on enhancing Nigeria's arbitration system. The committee produced a National Arbitration Policy and Arbitration Practice Direction.

== Human Rights and Civil Society Work ==
Agbakoba co-founded the Civil Liberties Organization (CLO), Nigeria's first formally recognised human rights organisation, serving as its president from 1987 to 1995. In that capacity, he was at the forefront of the long struggle for human rights and democracy in Nigeria from 1989 through to 2000. He was also founder of United Action for Democracy and the Zambian pan-African human rights organisation AfroNet. He was defence counsel for Civil Rights activist, Ken Saro-Wiwa who was executed. He was arrested several times because of his pro – democratic activities.^{.}

He is also affiliated with many human rights organisations around the world, some of which include the Human Rights Institute of the International Bar Association, the International Centre for the Protection of Cultural Diversity and Human Rights in Africa, African Human Rights and Governance Network, and the Nigerian Episcopal Commission for Justice and Peace. He was elected President of the Nigerian Bar Association (NBA) from 2006 to 2008, where he led several initiatives to improve the legal profession and justice delivery in Nigeria.

Agbakoba founded the Environmental Rights Action (ERA) in 1989, Nigeria's first environmental justice pressure group, and initiated some of Nigeria's first landmark environmental justice cases. He supported the establishment of Friends of the Earth Nigeria. He is Senior Counsel at the Human Rights Law Service (HURILAWS), a nonprofit organisation committed to human rights, good governance, and development.

== Public Sector Advisory and Legal Reform ==
Dr. Agbakoba is one of Nigeria's foremost policy and development lawyers, specialising in legislative frameworks that drive economic transformation. He has served as legal adviser to three former Nigerian Presidents, including President Goodluck Jonathan (2010–2015), focusing on reforms that strengthen the intersection of law, development, and economic growth. His work has produced major legislation and regulations designed to increase government revenue, create employment, and reduce administrative costs.

His constitutional reform work centres on advising the National Assembly, Nigeria's bicameral legislature, on comprehensive constitutional review. Dr. Agbakoba has proposed several bills, some currently under legislative consideration, that address fundamental governance structures, including devolution of powers from federal to state governments, environmental justice provisions, local government autonomy, and decentralisation of the judiciary. These proposals represent significant shifts towards more distributed governance in Africa's most populous nation.

Dr. Agbakoba's institutional influence extends beyond advisory roles to direct legislative drafting. He was instrumental in crafting the Coastal and Inland Shipping (Cabotage) Act 2003, legislation that reserves domestic shipping for Nigerian-flagged vessels, demonstrating his capacity to transform policy concepts into enforceable law. His work with the Central Bank of Nigeria produced foundational legislation for Nigeria's financial sector modernisation, including the Nigeria International Financial Centre Bill and Financial Consumer Protection Bill.

His judicial reform initiatives showcase his institutional impact on Nigeria's court system. Dr. Agbakoba led comprehensive procedural reforms across federal and state courts, developing new practice guidelines and implementing the "Speed of Justice" initiative to enhance judicial efficiency. These reforms directly shaped how Nigeria's courts operate, affecting millions of citizens' access to justice in a country where legal proceedings have historically faced significant delays.

== Achievements/Honours ==
Olisa Agbakoba, is the former president of the Nigerian Bar Association from 2006 to 2008 and a founding partner of Olisa Agbakoba and Associates, a leading maritime specialist law firm in Lagos. He is also the founder of Nigeria's foremost human rights organization, the Civil Liberties Organisation (CLO). He became known through his work in human rights and democracy movement in Nigeria. He was also the founder of United Action for Democracy and the Zambian pan-African human rights organization AfroNet. He was a defender for the Civil Rights activist, Ken Saro-Wiwa who was executed and was arrested several times because of his pro – democratic activities.

In 1990, Dr. Agbakoba was honoured with the Roger Baldwin Medal for Civil Liberties. In 1993, he received the Human Rights Award from the German Association of Judges and was also named one of the "15 Great Legal Practitioners of Distinction in Nigeria." He was also a recipient of Vanguard's "40 Outstanding Young Nigerians" Award.

In 1996, he was further recognised with the Aachen Peace Award and received the International Human Rights Award by the American Bar Association Section of Litigation, in recognition of extraordinary contributions to human rights, the rule of law, and access to justice.

He was conferred with the National Honour of Officer of the Order of the Niger (OON) by President Olusegun Obasanjo in 2001. That same year, he received the African Maritime Business Award for exemplary performance in maritime law and administration.

In 2004, he was honoured with the Humanitarian Service Award in recognition of his contribution to humanity and Rotary ideals. In 2006, he received both a Merit Award and the Distinguished Trailblazers Award from the NBA Women Forum, the Dr. Kwame Nkrumah African Leadership Award, and was named FRA Williams Legal Practitioner of the Year.

In December 2006, he was honoured with a Merit Award by the Human Rights Defenders Organisation of Nigeria (HURDON). He also received the Maroko Evictees Committee MANAA Award for his selfless service to humanity, including advocacy for displaced persons.

In 2007, he received the Distinguished Leadership Award for inclusion in The International Directory of Distinguished Leadership, recognising his outstanding contributions to society, and was recognised with an Award of Excellence by the Chartered Institute of Arbitrators Nigeria. In 2008, Dr. Agbakoba received a Merit Award from the Nigerian Bar Association for his outstanding service as NBA President.

He was recognised with an Award of Excellence by the Chartered Institute of Arbitrators Nigeria again in 2020. He received the Lifetime Achievement Award from OMIS Maritime & Offshore Award in 2022.

On 26 August 2024, Dr. Agbakoba was honoured with the Bar Presidential Award by the President of the Nigerian Bar Association, Yakubu Chonoko Maikyau, OON, SAN.

== Memberships/Affiliations ==
Dr. Olisa Agbakoba SAN is affiliated with several professional and industry bodies. He is a member of the Institute of Directors (IOD) Nigeria and a Fellow of the Institute of Administrative Management of Nigeria. He is also a member of the Business Recovery & Insolvency Practitioners Association of Nigeria (BRIPAN), reflecting his expertise in insolvency law. Dr. Agbakoba is a Fellow of the Board of Governors at the Institute of Shipping & Freight Management, and he holds membership in the International Bar Association (IBA), one of the foremost global legal bodies. He is a member of the National Action Committee on Ease of Doing Business (NASSBER) and Vice Chairman of the Presidential Committee on the review of the maritime sector. He is a member of the Nigerian Maritime Lawyers Association.

He is also a Fellow of the Chartered Institute of Arbitrators Nigeria, as well as a member of the Institute of Construction Industry Arbitrators. Additionally, he is a member of the Negotiation & Conflict Management Group (NCMG) and the Lagos Court of Arbitration (LCA) International Centre for Arbitration & ADR. Dr. Agbakoba is a long-standing member of the Nigerian Chamber of Shipping. He is a Fellow of the Chartered Institute of Mediators & Conciliators of Nigeria. He is also a member of Justice Sector Group Limited by Guarantee and a member of the Nigerian Environmental Law Society. He is the Chair of the Arbitration Committee, Nigerian Bar Association.

== Publications ==
- Legacy in Activism, Law and Leadership
- Development Law: Manual On Investment
- Development Law: Tools For Economic Reform
- Development Law: Manual On Financial Services
- From Cabotage To The Ocean And Beyond (Towards A National Ocean Policy)
- Controlling Endemic Corruption In Nigeria (Revised Edition)
- Speed Of Justice (Training Manual On Case Management)
- Manual On Debt Resolution And Recovery Process Under The Asset Management Corporation Of Nigeria Act (Amcon) 2010
- Bankruptcy Proceedings As A Tool For Debt Recovery
- The Impact Of The Money Laundering Act And Allied Laws On Lawyer/Client Confidentiality In Nigeria
- Hurilaws Legislative Agenda For Good Governance In Nigeria 1999-2004
- Rules Of Professional Conduct For Legal Practitioners
- Manual On Election Petitions In Nigeria (A Tool For The Legal Community)
- Reflections On The Linkages Between Electoral Reform And Constitutional Structure (Federalism)
- Maritime Newsletter Volume 1& 2
- Federal High Court Practice Manual

== Personal life ==
Olisa Agbakoba is married to Lilian Agbakoba, who is also a lawyer by profession, has three daughters and six grandchildren and lives in Lagos.
