= Internal migration in Italy =

Internal movement in Italy

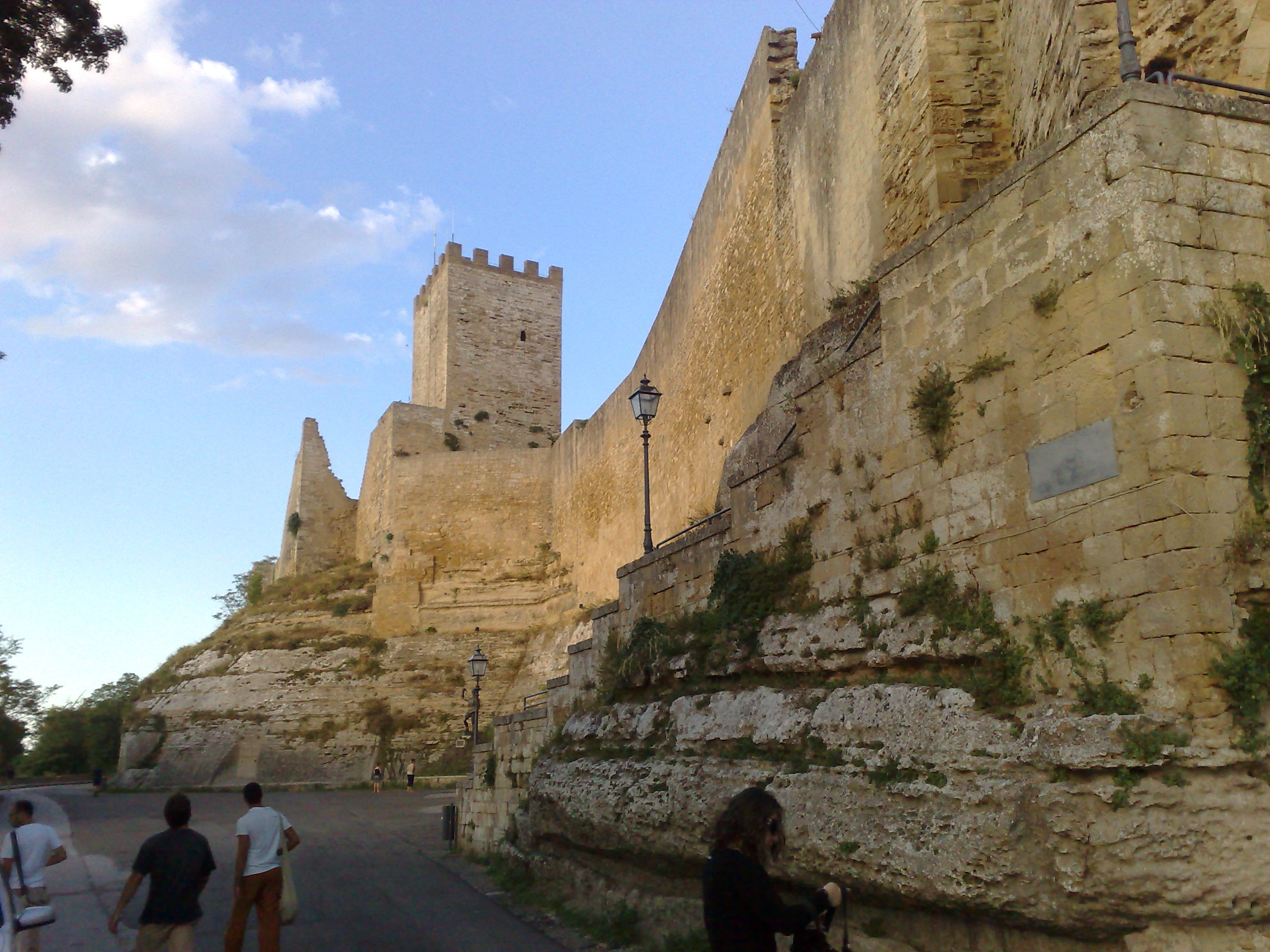
Castello di Lombardia, Enna, Sicily

Internal migration in Italy is a human migration within the Italian geographical region that occurred for similar reasons to emigration, primarily socioeconomic. Its largest wave consisted of 4 million people moving from Southern Italy to Northern Italy (and mostly to Northern or Central Italian industrial cities like Rome or Milan, etc.), between the 1950s and 1970s.

== Early history ==
The oldest migration goes back to the 11th century when soldiers and settlers from Northern Italy (at the time collectively called "Lombardy"), settled the central and eastern part of Sicily during the Norman conquest of southern Italy. After the marriage between the Norman king Roger I of Sicily with Adelaide del Vasto, member of Aleramici family, many Lombard colonisers left their homeland, in the Aleramici's possessions in Piedmont and Liguria, to settle on the island of Sicily. The migration of people from Northern Italy to Sicily continued until the end of the 13th century. In the same period people from Northern Italy also emigrated to Basilicata. It is believed that the population of Northern Italy who immigrated to Sicily during these centuries was altogether about 200,000 people. Their descendants, who are still present in Sicily today, are called Lombards of Sicily. Following these ancient migrations, in some municipalities of Sicily and Basilicata, dialects of northern origin are still spoken today, the Gallo-Italic of Sicily and the Gallo-Italic of Basilicata.

Distribution of Gallo-Italic of Sicily

The Normans began a process of 'latinization' of Sicily by encouraging an immigration policy of their people, French (Norman, Provencal and Breton) and northern Italians (in particular from Piedmont and Liguria) with the granting of lands and privileges. The aim of the new Norman kings was to strengthen the "Latin stock", which in Sicily was a minority, compared to the more numerous Greek populations.

Beginning from the end of the 11th century were repopulated the central and eastern parts of the island, the Val Demone, where there was a strong Byzantine presence and the Val di Noto, with colonists and soldiers from the Aleramici mark which included the Monferrato in Piedmont, part of the Ligurian hinterland of the west, and small portions of the western areas of Lombardy and Emilia.

The migration of people from Northern Italy to Sicily continued until the end of the 13th century. It is believed that the population of Northern Italy who immigrated to Sicily in these centuries was altogether about 200,000 people.

The major centres, called historically oppida Lombardorum, where these dialects can still be heard today, include Piazza Armerina, Aidone, Sperlinga, San Fratello, Nicosia, and Novara di Sicilia. Northern Italian dialects did not survive in some towns in the province of Catania, Syracuse and Caltanissetta that developed large Lombard communities during this period, for example Paternò and Butera. However, the Northern Italian influence in the local varieties of Sicilian are marked.

In the case of San Fratello, some linguists have suggested that the Gallic-Italic dialect present today has Provençal as its basis, having been a fort manned by Provençal mercenaries in the early decades of the Norman conquest (bearing in mind that it took the Normans 30 years to conquer the whole of the island).

A map of the County of Nice showing the area of the Kingdom of Sardinia annexed in 1860 to France (light brown). The area in red had already become part of France before 1860.

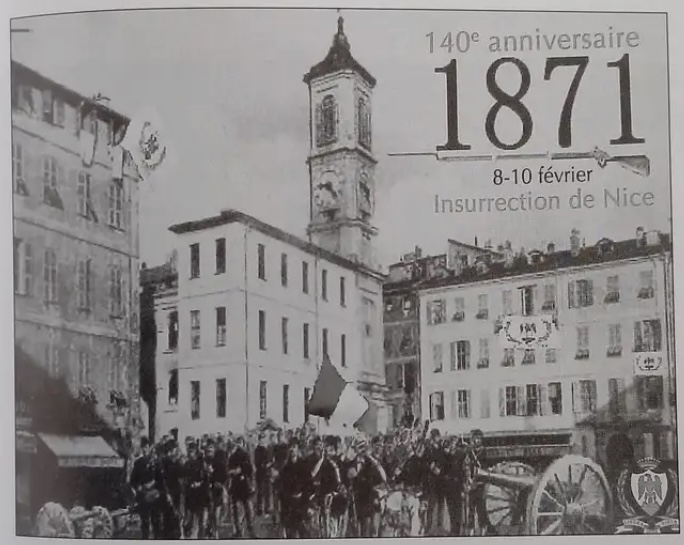
Pro-Italian protests in Nice, 1871, during the Niçard Vespers

An important internal migration involved Italian speakers from France to Italy. Corsica passed from the Republic of Genoa to France in 1769 after the Treaty of Versailles, while Savoy and the area around Nice passed from the Kingdom of Piedmont-Sardinia to France in 1860 as a consequence of the Plombières Agreement; Francization occurred in both cases and caused a near-disappearance of the Italian language as many of the Italian speakers in these areas migrated to Italy. Giuseppe Garibaldi complained about the referendum that allowed France to annex Savoy and Nice, and a group of his followers (among the Italian Savoyards) took refuge in Italy in the following years. As for Nice, the emigration phenomenon of the Niçard Italians towards Italy is known as the "Niçard exodus". Italian was the official language of Corsica until 1859. Giuseppe Garibaldi called for the inclusion of the "Corsican Italians" within Italy when Rome was annexed to the Kingdom of Italy, but King Victor Emmanuel II did not agree to it.

Another important internal migration took place between the second half of the 19th century and the first half of the 20th century. It was the one that involved the transfer of seasonal migrants from the "irredent" territories, not yet annexed to the mother country (Trentino-Alto Adige and Julian March), to the nearby Kingdom of Italy. Men generally worked as mill workers, moléti (grinders) and charcuterie; women instead worked in the cities or as service personnel in wealthy families. This emigration was usually seasonal (especially for men) and characterized the winter period during which the peasants could not work the land. This migratory context at the end of the 19th century was studied by the Trentino and Giudicarian priest Don Lorenzo Guetti, father of Trentino cooperation, who wrote in one of his articles, "If there were no Italy, we Giudicarians would have to die of hunger".

== Modern era ==
During the Fascist era from the 1920s to the 1940s, limited internal emigration occurred. The regime led by Benito Mussolini, however, was opposed to these migratory movements, so much so that it implemented legislative measures that hindered, but did not stop, these movements. An example was a 1939 law that allowed the transfer to another Italian municipality only if the migrant was in possession of an employment contract from a company based in the destination municipality. At the time, internal migratory flows also involved transfers from the countryside to the cities, movements that are more properly defined as internal "mobility" rather than "emigration" that occurs between one Italian region to another.

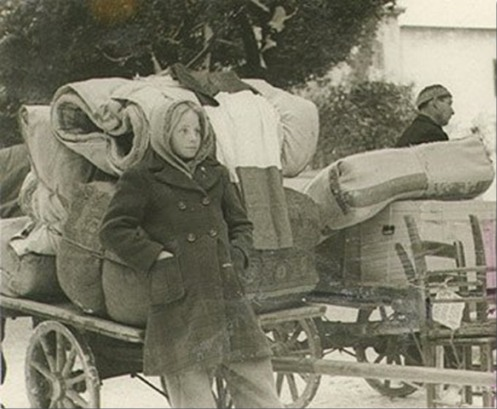
A young Italian exile on the run carries, along with her personal effects, a flag of Italy, during the Istrian-Dalmatian exodus.

After World War II, under the Treaty of Peace with Italy, 1947, the territories of the Kingdom of Italy (Istria, Kvarner, most of the Julian March as well as the Dalmatian city of Zara) first occupied by the People's Liberation Army of Yugoslavia of Marshal Josip Broz Tito and subsequently annexed by Yugoslavia, caused the Istrian-Dalmatian exodus. This led to the emigration of between 230,000 and 350,000 of local ethnic Italians (Istrian Italians and Dalmatian Italians), the others being ethnic Slovenians, ethnic Croatians, and ethnic Istro-Romanians, choosing to maintain Italian citizenship. Most went to Italy, and in smaller numbers, towards the Americas, Australia and South Africa. In this context there was also the exodus of the Monfalconese shipyards where approximately 2,000 workers of Friuli-Venezia Giulia who, between 1946 and 1948, emigrated to Yugoslavia to offer their professional skills at the shipyards of Fiume and Pola.

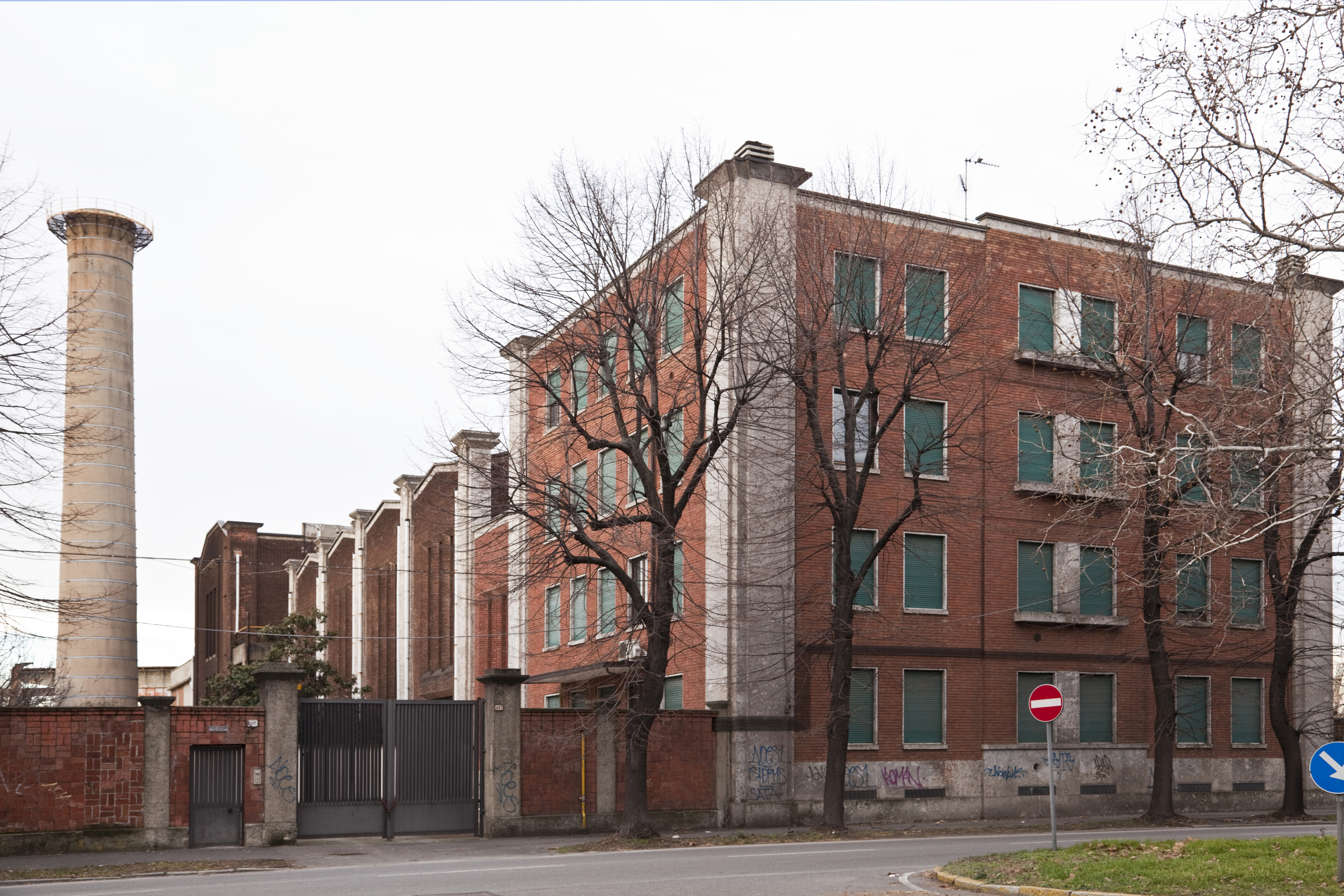
View of the Falck steelworks in Sesto San Giovanni, in Lombardy

With the fall of Fascist regime in 1943, and the end of World War II in 1945, a large internal migratory flow began from one Italian region to another. This internal emigration was sustained and constantly increased by the economic growth that Italy experienced between the 1950s and 1960s. Given that this economic growth mostly concerned Northwest Italy, which was involved in the birth of many industrial activities, migratory phenomena affected the peasants of the Triveneto and southern Italy, who began to move in large numbers. Other areas of northern Italy were also affected by emigration such as the rural areas of Mantua and Cremona. The destinations of these emigrants were mainly Milan, Turin, Varese, Como, Lecco, and Brianza. The rural population of the aforementioned areas began to emigrate to the large industrial centers of the north-west, especially in the so-called "industrial triangle, or the area corresponding to the three-sided polygon with vertices in the cities of Turin, Milan and Genoa. Even some cities in central and southern Italy (such as Rome, which was the object of immigration due to employment in the administrative and tertiary sectors) experienced a conspicuous immigration flow. These migratory movements were accompanied by other flows of lesser intensity, such as transfers from the countryside to smaller cities and travel from mountainous areas to the plains.

The main reasons that gave rise to this massive migratory flow were linked to the living conditions in the places of origin of the emigrants (which were very harsh), the absence of stable work, the high rate of poverty, the poor fertility of many agricultural areas, the fragmentation of land properties, which characterized southern Italy above all, and the insecurity caused by organized crime. Added to this was the economic gap between northern and southern Italy, which widened during the economic boom; this was a further stimulus for southern Italians to emigrate to the north of the country. The reasons were therefore the same as those that pushed millions of Italians to emigrate abroad.

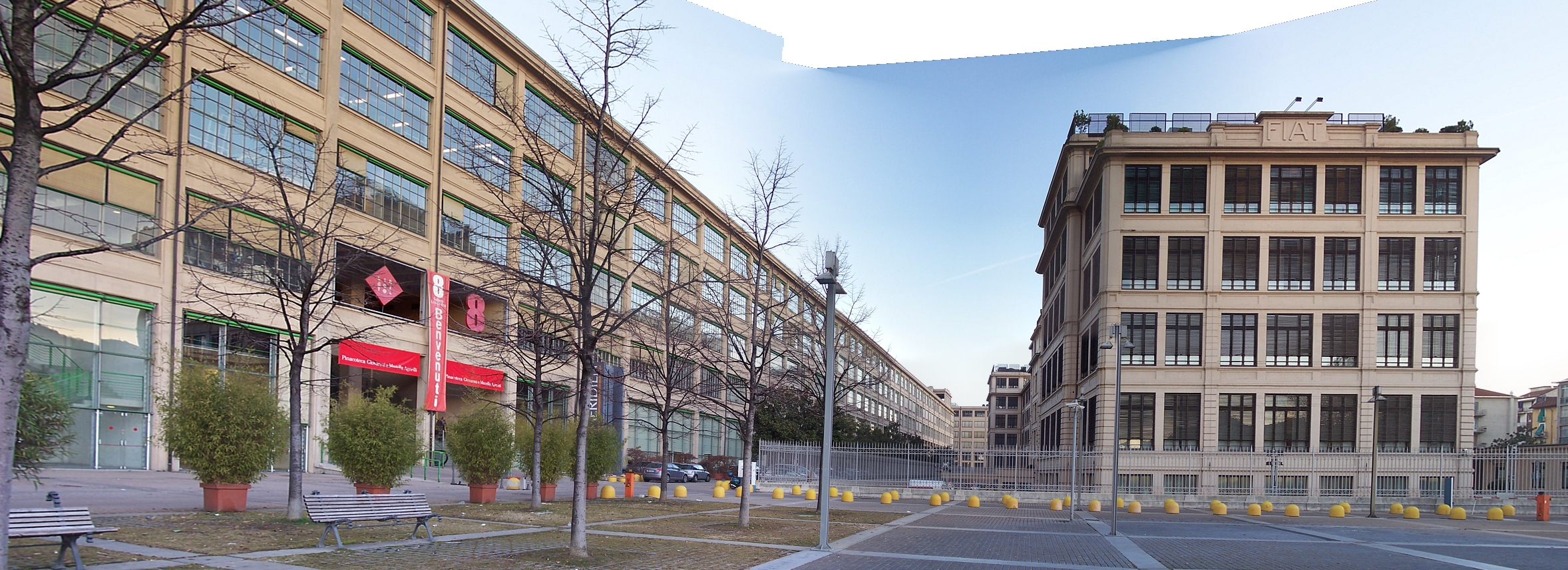
The former FIAT plant of the Lingotto in Turin

The peak of internal migratory movements was reached in the mid-1960s, between 1955 and 1963. In the five years from 1958 to 1963, 1.3 million people moved from southern Italy. Registrations at city registry offices in the industrial triangle tripled, from 69,000 new arrivals in 1958 to 183,000 in 1963, and to 200,000 in 1964. Turin, which experienced a conspicuous immigration phenomenon, recorded 64,745 new arrivals in 1960, 84,426 in 1961 and 79,742 in 1962. The migratory flow was so large that the Ferrovie dello Stato set up a special convoy, called the Treno del Sole (Train of the Sun), which departed from Palermo and arrived in Turin after having crossed the entire Italian peninsula.

Then began the slow decline of emigration, with the migratory flows from Veneto which, already at the end of the 1960s, stopped due to the improved living conditions in these places. Migrations from southern Italy, although slowed down, did not end, increasing their percentage compared to total internal migrations; between 1952 and 1957 they represented 17% of the total, and between 1958 and 1963 they represented 30% of the total.

The last peak of arrivals from the south to the north of Italy occurred between 1968 and 1970. In 1969, 60,000 arrivals were recorded in Turin, half of which came from southern Italy, while 70,000 immigrants arrived in Lombardy that same year. In Turin this migratory peak was exacerbated by FIAT, which carried out a recruitment campaign where 15,000 migrants from the south were hired. These numbers gave rise to many problems in the Turin capital, above all, housing. This constant flow of people made Turin's population grow from 719,000 inhabitants in 1951 to 1,168,000 in 1971. After 1970 there was a strong contraction in arrivals, which occurred during the 1973 oil crisis, and many of the migrants returned to their places of origin.

Overall, the Italians who moved from southern to northern Italy amounted to 4 million. The migratory flow from the countryside to the big cities also contracted and then stopped in the 1980s. At the same time, migratory movements towards medium-sized cities and those destined for small-sized villages increased.

In the 1990s, migratory flows from the south to the north of the country restarted with a certain consistency, although not at the same level of the 1960s. The phenomenon was recorded by the Svimez institute (acronym for "Association for the development of industry in the South"). Migratory flows continue to come from the regions of southern Italy, with the main destinations being the north-east of the country and central Italy. The regions most active in receiving internal immigrants are Lombardy, Veneto, Emilia-Romagna, Tuscany, and Umbria.

== See also ==
- Italians
- Italian diaspora
- Genetic history of Italy
