= Geographical distribution of Italian speakers =

This article details the geographical distribution of speakers of the Italian language, regardless of the legislative status within the countries where it is spoken. In addition to the Italian-speaking area in Europe, Italian-speaking minorities are present in few countries. More than 67 million people in the world speak Italian as their first language and more than 80 million have it as either their first or second language.

== Statistics ==
=== Native speakers by country ===
The following table presents estimates of the number of people worldwide who speak Italian as their first language (mother tongue). The data are derived from a variety of sources, including national censuses, official surveys conducted by statistical agencies, and independent studies or estimates. Where sources do not account for the entire population (for example, by excluding children or focusing on specific age groups) estimates are projected to the total population. Since definitions vary across sources, the table includes the specific criteria used in each case (for example mother tongue or language spoken at home) for a better interpretation of the figures.

Country	Absolute	%	Source	Definition	Notes
Albania	523	0.02%	2011 census	Mother tongue	
Argentina	1,500,000	3.7%	Estimate	Mother tongue	
Australia	290,328	1.24%	2016 census	Language spoken at home	(Note: The reported population size was obtained by projecting the responded percentage to the total population, since the source either included the part of the population who didn't answer or didn't take into account some parts of the population, for example children.)
Austria	10,742	0.13%	2001 census	Colloquial language	
Belgium	190,816	1.72%	2012 survey	Mother tongue	(Note: Population data by Eurostat, using the source year. "The number of persons having their usual residence in a country on 1 January of the respective year". ec.europa.eu.)
Brazil	4,050,000	2.07%	Estimate	Mother tongue	In Brazil, the Italian language is co-official in the municipalities of Encantado (Rio Grande do Sul), José Boiteux (Santa Catarina), Santa Tereza (Espírito Santo), Santo Ângelo (Rio Grande do Sul), São Bento do Sul (Santa Catarina) and Venda Nova do Imigrante (Espírito Santo).
Canada	375,635	1.08%	2016 census	Mother tongue	
Colombia	122,901	0.30%	2005 census	Language spoken	(Note: The reported population size was obtained by projecting the respondent percentage to the total population, since the source either included the part of the population who didn't answer or didn't take into account some parts of the population, for example children.)
Croatia	18,573	0.43%	2011 census	Mother tongue	
England (United Kingdom)	162,843	0.29%	2021 census	Main language	Population 3 years and older
Finland	3,659	0.07%	2023 census	Mother tongue	
France	655,961	1.03%	2007 survey	Mother tongue	
Germany	632,903	0.76%	2010 survey	Mother tongue	
Ireland	18,725	0.37%	2022 census	Language spoken at home	
Italy	57,490,841	96.8%	2012 survey	Mother tongue	
Libya	22,530	0.40%	2004 estimate		
Liechtenstein	570	1.51%	2015 census	Main language	
Luxembourg	20,021	3.55%	2021 census	Main language	
Malta	13,397	2.69%	2021 census	Mother tongue	
Monaco	8,172	21.9%	2016 census	Citizenship	
New Zealand	8,214	0.22%	2018 census	Language spoken	
Northern Ireland (United Kingdom)	939	0.05%	2021 census	Main language	Population 3 years and older
Poland	38,388	0.10%	2021 census	Language spoken at home	
Portugal	9,411	0.09%	2012 survey	Mother tongue	
Romania	4,105	0.02%	2021 census	Mother tongue	
Russia	1,013	0.001%	2010 census	Mother tongue	
San Marino	25,000	85.5%	2004 estimate		
Scotland (United Kingdom)	9,181	0.17%	2022 census	Main Language	Population 3 years and older
Slovakia	1,465	0.03%	2021 census	Mother tongue	
Slovenia	5,972	0.31%	2002 census	Language spoken at home	
South Africa	5,768	0.01%	1996 census	Mother tongue	
Spain	191,294	0.41%	2021 official survey	Mother tongue	Population 2 years and older
Switzerland	676,115	7.72%	2023 official survey	Main language	
Tunisia	32,021	0.3%	2011 survey		
Uruguay	21,077	1.1%	2019 official survey	Language spoken	
United States	557,709	0.17%	2023 official survey	Language spoken at home	Population 5 years and older
Wales (United Kingdom)	2,437	0.08%	2021 census	Main language	Population 3 years and older
Total	67,179,249				

==== Subnational territories ====
In the following territories, Italian is an official language. Apart from Ticino, Italian is official alongside at least another language, such as German, Slovene, Croatian, Ladin and Romansh.

Territory	Country	L1 speakers	%	Source	Definition
Istria County	Croatia	14,205	6.8%	2011 census	Mother tongue
South Tyrol	Italy	141,300 (Note: Based on a 2014 population of 515,714 (Statistiche demografiche ISTAT))	27.4%	2014 official survey	Mother tongue
Piran/Pirano	Slovenia	1,871	11.2%	2002 census	Language spoken at home
Izola/Isola	Slovenia	1,118	7.7%	2002 census	Language spoken at home
Koper/Capodistria	Slovenia	2,015	4.2%	2002 census	Language spoken at home
Total Slovene Istria	Slovenia	5,004	6.3%	2002 census	Language spoken at home
Grigioni	Switzerland	24,706	12.3%	2023 official survey	Main language
Ticino	Switzerland	309,062	88.0%	2023 official survey	Main language

==== Unspecified ====
Country	Absolute	%	Source
Venezuela	132,758	0.42%	
Uruguay	94,442	2.74%	
Chile	56,834	0.32%	
Netherlands	39,519	0.23%	
South Africa	33,716	0.06%	
Peru	32,362	0.10%	
Austria	27,178	0.31%	
Mexico	16,200	0.2%	
Japan	6,900	0.01%	

=== Total speakers by country ===
Country	Speakers (L1+L2)		Source	Notes
Country	Number	%	Source	Notes
Albania	799,414	27.8%	2016 official survey	(Note: Percentage refers to people who specify Italian as the 'foreign language known better'.) (Note: Based on a 2016 population of 2,875,592 (Albanian Institute of Statistics))
Argentina	1,359,791	3.48%	2006 survey	
Canada	574,725	1.67%	2016 census	
Colombia	122,901	0.30%	2005 census	
European Union	70,439,773	15.7%	2023 survey	EU countries with the highest percentages: Italy (95.0%), Malta (51.9%), Slovenia (12.9%), Luxembourg (10.2%), Austria (8.0%), Croatia (7.9%), Belgium (6.7%), France (5.3%).
Montenegro	30,553	4.58%	2023 census	Population 15 years and older
Russia	83,202	0.06%	2010 census	
Switzerland	1,277,411	15.5%	2014 official survey	
Uruguay	178,794	9.6%	2019 official survey	
United Kingdom	1,335,739	2.1%	2012 survey	
United States	3,820,442	1.21%	2013 survey	
Venezuela	600,000	2.58%	2010 estimate	
Total	80,622,745			

== Europe ==
Knowledge of Italian according to EU statistics

Italian is an official language of Italy, San Marino and Switzerland. Italian is also used in administration and official documents in Vatican City.

In central-east Europe Italian is first in Montenegro, second in Austria, Croatia, Slovenia, and Ukraine after English, and third in Hungary, Romania and Russia after English and German. But throughout the world, Italian is the fifth most taught foreign language, after English, French, German, and Spanish.

In the European Union statistics, Italian is spoken as a native language by 13% of the EU population, or 65 million people, mainly in Italy. In the EU, it is spoken as a second language by 3% of the EU population, or 14 million people. Among EU states, the percentage of people able to speak Italian well enough to have a conversation is 66% in Malta, 15% in Slovenia, 14% in Croatia, 8% in Austria, 5% in France and Luxembourg, and 4% in the former West Germany, Greece, Cyprus, and Romania.

=== Albania ===
In Albania, Italian is one of the most spoken languages. This is due to the strong historical ties between Italy and Albania but also the Albanian communities in Italy, and the 19,000 Italians living in Albania. It is reported that as much as 70% of the Albanian adult population has some knowledge of Italian. Furthermore, the Albanian government has pushed to make Italian a compulsory second language in schools. Today, Italian is the third most spoken language in the country after Albanian and Greek.

The Italian language is well known and studied in Albania, another non-EU member, due to its historical ties and geographical proximity to Italy and to the broadcasting of Italian television in the country.

=== Croatia, Slovenia and Montenegro ===
Italian formerly had official status in Montenegro (because of the Venetian Albania), and in parts of Slovenia and Croatia (because of the Venetian Istria and Venetian Dalmatia). Italian language in Slovenia is an officially recognized minority language in the country. The official census, carried out in 2002, reported 2,258 ethnic Italians (Istrian Italians) in Slovenia (0.11% of the total population). Italian language in Croatia is an official minority language in the country, with many schools and public announcements published in both languages. The 2001 census in Croatia reported 19,636 ethnic Italians (Istrian Italians and Dalmatian Italians) in the country (some 0.42% of the total population). Their numbers dropped dramatically after World War II following the Istrian–Dalmatian exodus, which caused the emigration of between 230,000 and 350,000 Istrian Italians and Dalmatian Italians. Italian was the official language of the Republic of Ragusa from 1492 to 1807.

=== France and Monaco ===
Italian is also spoken by a minority in Monaco and France, especially in the southeastern part of the country. Italian was the official language in Savoy and in Nice until 1860, when they were both annexed by France under the Treaty of Turin, a development that triggered the "Niçard exodus", or the emigration of a quarter of the Niçard Italians to Italy, and the Niçard Vespers. Giuseppe Garibaldi complained about the referendum that allowed France to annex Savoy and Nice, and a group of his followers (among the Italian Savoyards) took refuge in Italy in the following years. Corsica passed from the Republic of Genoa to France in 1769 after the Treaty of Versailles. Italian was the official language of Corsica until 1859. Giuseppe Garibaldi called for the inclusion of the "Corsican Italians" within Italy when Rome was annexed to the Kingdom of Italy, but King Victor Emmanuel II did not agree to it. Today it is estimated that only 10% of Corsica's population speak the language natively, with 50% having some sort of proficiency in it. Italian is generally understood in Corsica by the population resident therein who speak Corsican, which is an Italo-Romance idiom similar to Tuscan. Francization occurred in Nice and Corsica cases, and caused a near-disappearance of the Italian language as many of the Italian speakers in these areas migrated to Italy. Ligurian is recognized as a regional language in the French department of the Alpes-Maritimes, furthermore, there is an autochthonous Italian population dating from the Savoyard Kingdom of Sardinia, which controlled the area until 1860, the year the Treaty of Turin entered into force, regardless the more recent Italian immigrants of the twentieth century. Italian was the official language in Monaco until 1860, when it was replaced by the French. This was due to the annexation of the surrounding County of Nice to France following the Treaty of Turin (1860).

=== Greece ===
Italian formerly had official status in parts of Greece (because of the Venetian rule in the Ionian Islands and by the Kingdom of Italy in the Dodecanese).

=== Malta ===
Italian is widely spoken in Malta, where nearly two-thirds of the population can speak it fluently (see Maltese Italian). Italian served as Malta's official language until 1934, when it was abolished by the British colonial administration amid strong local opposition.

=== Switzerland ===
Italian is official, together with French, German and Romansch, in Switzerland, with most of the 0.7 million speakers concentrated in the south of the country, in the cantons of Ticino and southern Grisons (predominately in Italian Grisons). Italian is the third most spoken language in Switzerland (after German and French), but its use has slightly declined since the 1970s.

== Africa ==
Due to heavy Italian influence during the Italian colonial period, Italian is still understood by some in former colonies. Outside former colonies, Italian is also understood and spoken in Tunisia and Egypt by a small part of the population.

=== Eritrea ===
In Eritrea, Italian is at times used in commerce and the capital city Asmara still has one Italian-language school. The official language of Eritrea, Tigrinya, has a number of words borrowed from Italian.

=== Libya ===
Although it was the primary language in Libya since colonial rule, Italian greatly declined under the rule of Muammar Gaddafi, who expelled the Italian Libyan population and made Arabic the sole official language of the country. Nevertheless, Italian continues to be used in economic sectors in Libya, and today it is the most spoken second language in the country.

=== Somalia ===
Italian was also introduced to Somalia through colonialism and was the sole official language of administration and education during the colonial period but fell out of use after government, educational and economic infrastructure were destroyed in the Somali Civil War. Italian is still understood by some elderly and other people. The official languages of the Somali Republic are Somali (Maay and Maxaatiri) and Arabic. The working languages during the Transitional Federal Government were Italian and English.

=== Ethiopia ===
Italian is still spoken by few parts of the Ethiopian population (mostly among older generations) despite the brief period under Italian rule when compared with the other colonies, and it is taught in many schools (most notably the Istituto Statale Italiano Omnicomprensivo di Addis Abeba). Also, Ethiopian languages such as Amharic and Tigrinya have some words borrowed from the Italian language.

== Americas ==
=== Canada ===
In Canada, Italian is the second most spoken non-official language when varieties of Chinese are not grouped together, with over 660,000 speakers (or about 2.1% of the population) according to the 2006 Census.

=== Costa Rica ===
In Costa Rica, Central America, Italian is one of the most important immigration community languages, after English. It is spoken in the southern area of the country in cities like San Vito and other communities of Coto Brus, near the south borderline with Panama.

=== South America ===
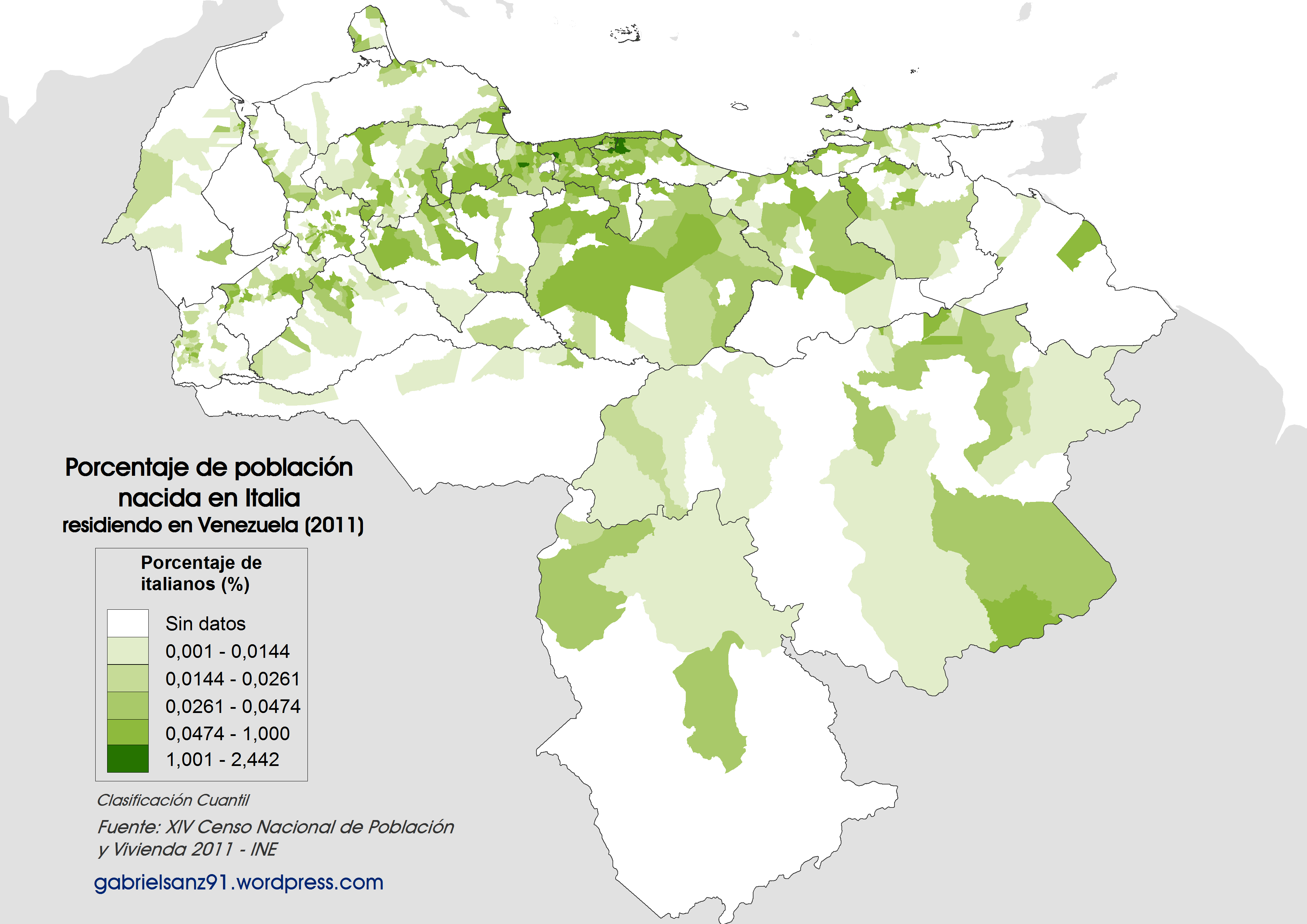
Percentage of population born in Italy

Italian immigrants to South America have also brought a presence of the language to that continent. In Argentina about 63% of the population has Italian ancestry, and Italian is the second most spoken language after the official language of Spanish, with over 1 million (mainly of the older generation) speaking it at home. Italian has also significantly influenced the dialect of Spanish spoken in Argentina and Uruguay, mostly in phonology and vocabulary, known as Rioplatense Spanish. Its impact can also be seen in the Portuguese prosody of the Brazilian state of São Paulo, which itself has 15 million Italian descendants. Italian bilingual speakers can be found in the Southeast of Brazil as well as in the South. In Venezuela, Italian is the most spoken language after Spanish and Portuguese, with around 200,000 speakers. Smaller Italian-speaking minorities on the continent are also found in Paraguay and Ecuador.

Also, variants of regional languages of Italy are used. Examples include the Talian dialect in Brazil, where it is officially a historic patrimony of Rio Grande do Sul; the Chipilo Venetian dialect in Mexico; and Cocoliche and Lunfardo in Argentina, especially in Buenos Aires.

=== United States ===
Distribution of the Italian language in the United States.

Although over 17 million Americans are of Italian descent, only around 709,000 people in the United States spoke Italian at home in 2013. Nevertheless, an Italian language media market does exist in the country. On the other hand, although technology allows for the Italian language to spread globally, there has been a decrease in the number of Italian speakers in the home in the United States. According to the U.S. Census Bureau, the number of those speaking Italian at home in 1980 was 1,614,344. In 1990, those speaking Italian at home in the United States had dropped to 1,308,648. In 2000, the number of speakers decreased to 1,008,370, and finally, in 2010, it had plummeted to 725,223. The percent change from 1980 to 2010 was a negative 55.2.

In the United States, Italian is the fourth most taught foreign language after Spanish, French, and German, in that order (or the fifth if American Sign Language is considered).

== Australia ==
In Australia, Italian is the second most spoken foreign language after Chinese, with 1.4% of the population speaking it as their home language. The Italo-Australian dialect came into note in the 1970s by Italian linguist Tullio De Mauro.
