= Niçard Italians =

Ethnic group

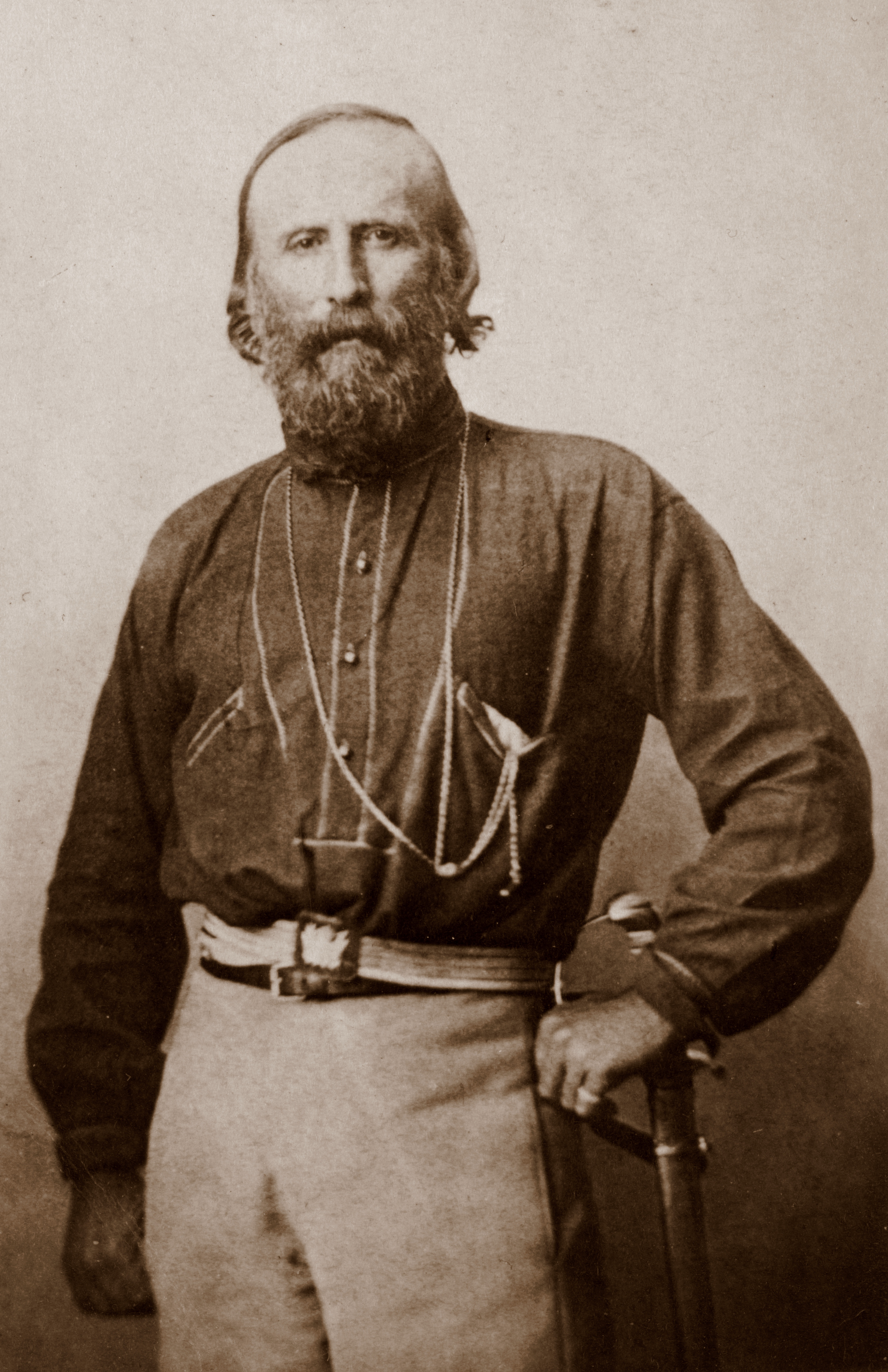
Giuseppe Garibaldi, a prominent Niçard Italian

Niçard Italians (Italian: nizzardi italiani pronounced [nitˈtsardi itaˈljaːni]; Occitan: Italians de Niça) are Italians who have full or partial Nice heritage by birth or ethnicity.

== History ==
Niçard Italians have roots in Nice and the County of Nice. They often speak the Ligurian language after Nice joined the Genoa league formed by the cities of Liguria at the end of the 7th century. In 729, with Genoese help, Nice expelled the Saracens from its territory.

During the Middle Ages, as an Italian city, Nice participated in numerous Italian wars. As an ally of the Republic of Pisa, it was also an enemy of the Republic of Genoa. In 1388, Nice placed itself under the protection of the Comital family of Savoy, led by Amadeus VII, Count of Savoy, in an anti-Provençal function (creating the County of Nice). On 25 October 1561, following the Edict of Rivoli, Italian replaced Latin as the language for drafting official documents of the County of Nice. Niçard Italians, with their Niçard dialect, considered themselves completely Italian during the Renaissance, according to Nice scholars such as Enrico Sappia.

The French penetration began in the early 18th century when numerous Occitan peasants moved to the mountainous hinterland of the county of Nice occupied by the French, and reached its apogee at the time of the French Revolution when Nice was annexed to France for the first time. Italians from Nice reacted with the guerrilla warfare of "Barbetismo".

French annexation in 1860 (black).

The so-called "Savoy period" (which lasted from 1388 to 1860) ended with Risorgimento. After the Treaty of Turin was signed in 1860 between the Sardinian king and Napoleon III as a consequence of the Plombières Agreement, the county was again and definitively ceded to France as a territorial reward for French assistance in the Second Italian War of Independence against Austria, which saw Lombardy united with the Kingdom of Sardinia. King Victor-Emmanuel II, on April 1, 1860, solemnly asked the population to accept the change of sovereignty, in the name of Italian unity, and the cession was ratified by a regional referendum. Italophile manifestations and the acclamation of an “Italian Nice” by the crowd were reported on this occasion. These manifestations could not influence the course of events. A plebiscite was voted on April 15 and April 16, 1860. The opponents to annexation called for abstention, hence the very high abstention rate. The “yes” vote won 83% of registered voters throughout the county of Nice and 86% in Nice, partly thanks to pressure from the authorities. This was the result of a masterful operation of information control by the French and Piedmontese governments, in order to influence the outcome of the vote in relation to the decisions already taken. The irregularities in the plebiscite voting operations were evident. The case of the village of Levens is illustrative: the same official sources recorded that 481 votes were cast, naturally almost all of them in favor of joining France, when the voting roll listed only 407 voters.

The Italian language, the official language of the County, used by the Church, at the town hall, taught in schools, used in theaters and at the Opera, was immediately abolished and replaced by French. Discontentment over annexation to France led to the emigration of a large part of the Italophile population, also accelerated by Italian unification after 1861. A quarter of the population of Nice, around 11,000 people from Nice, decided for voluntarily exile to Italy. The emigration of a quarter of the Niçard Italians to Italy took the name of the Niçard exodus. Many Italians from Nizza then moved to the Ligurian towns of Ventimiglia, Bordighera and Ospedaletti, giving rise to a local branch of the movement of the Italian irredentists which considered the re-acquisition of Nice to be one of their nationalist goals.

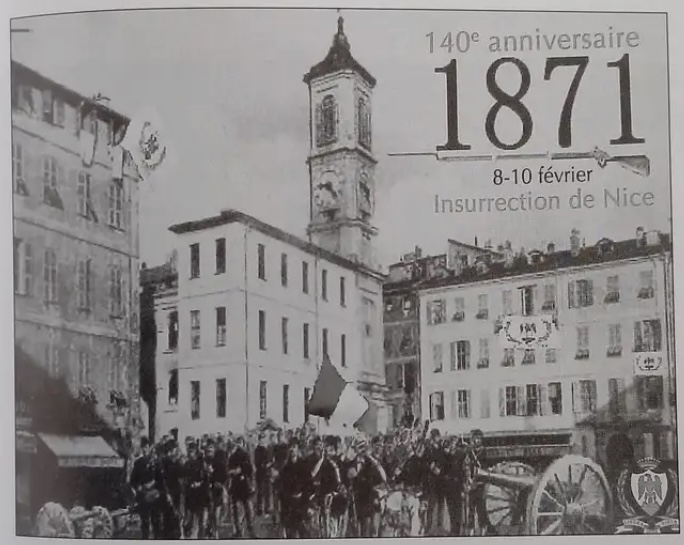
Pro-Italian protests in Nice, 1871, during the Niçard Vespers

Giuseppe Garibaldi, born in Nice, tenaciously opposed the cession of his hometown to France, arguing that the Plebiscite he ratified in the treaty was vitiated by electoral fraud. In 1871, during the first free elections in the County, the pro-Italian lists obtained almost all the votes in the legislative elections (26,534 votes out of 29,428 votes cast), and Garibaldi was elected deputy at the National Assembly. Pro-Italians took to the streets cheering “Viva Nizza! Viva Garibaldi!”. The French government sent 10,000 soldiers to Nice, closed the Italian newspaper Il Diritto di Nizza and imprisoned several demonstrators. The population of Nice rose up from February 8 to 10 and the three days of demonstration became known as the "Niçard Vespers". The revolt was suppressed by French troops. On February 13, Garibaldi was not allowed to speak at the French parliament meeting in Bordeaux to ask for the reunification of Nice to the newborn Italian unitary state, and he resigned from his post as deputy. The failure of Vespers led to the expulsion of the last pro-Italian intellectuals from Nice, such as Luciano Mereu and Giuseppe Bres, who were expelled or deported.

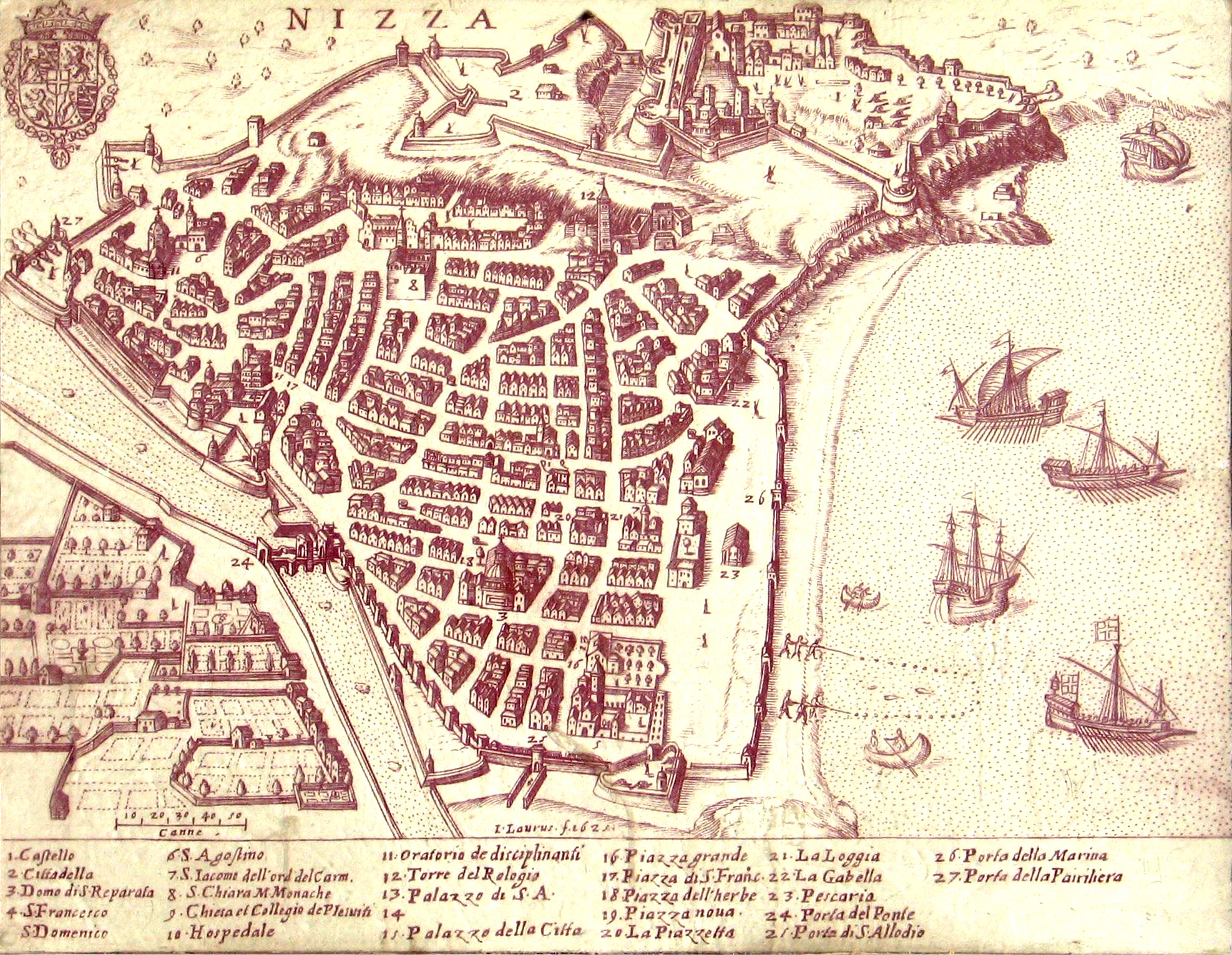
Nice in 1624, when it was called Nizza

The pro-Italian irredentist movement persisted throughout the period 1860-1914, despite the repression carried out since the annexation. The French government implemented a policy of Francization of society, language and culture. The toponyms of the communes of the ancient County have been francized, with the obligation to use French in Nice as well as certain surnames (for example the Italian surname "Bianchi" was francized into "Leblanc", and the Italian surname "Del Ponte" was francized into "Dupont"). This led to the beginning of the disappearance of the Niçard Italians. Many intellectuals from Nice took refuge in Italy, such as Giovan Battista Bottero who took over the direction of the newspaper La Gazzetta del Popolo in Turin. In 1874, it was the second Italian newspaper by circulation, after Il Secolo in Milan.

Italian-language newspapers in Nice were banned. In 1861, La Voce di Nizza was closed (temporarily reopened during the Niçard Vespers), followed by Il Diritto di Nizza, closed in 1871. In 1895 it was the turn of Il Pensiero di Nizza, accused of irredentism. Many journalists and writers from Nice wrote in these newspapers in Italian. Among these are Enrico Sappia, Giuseppe André, Giuseppe Bres, Eugenio Cais di Pierlas and others.

Another Niçard Italian, Garibaldian Luciano Mereu, was exiled from Nice in November 1870, together with the Garibaldians Adriano Gilli, Carlo Perino and Alberto Cougnet. In 1871, Luciano Mereu was elected City Councilor in Nice during the term of Mayor of Augusto Raynaud (1871–1876) and was a member of the Garibaldi Commission of Nice, whose president was Donato Rasteu. Rasteu remained in office until 1885.

In 1881, The New York Times compared that before the annexation to France, the Nice people were as Italian as the Genoese, and that their dialect was an Italian dialect.

This led to the beginning of the disappearance of the Niçard Italians. Many intellectuals from Nice took refuge in Italy, such as Giovan Battista Bottero who took over the direction of the newspaper La Gazzetta del Popolo in Turin. In 1874, it was the second Italian newspaper by circulation, after Il Secolo in Milan.

Giuseppe Bres tried to counter the French claim that the Niçard dialect was Occitan and not Italian, publishing his Considerations on Niçard dialect in 1906 in Italy.

In 1940, Nice was occupied by the Italian army and the newspaper Il Nizzardo ("The Niçard") was restored there. It was directed by Ezio Garibaldi, grandson of Giuseppe Garibaldi. Only Menton was administered until 1943 as if it were an Italian territory, even if the Italian supporters of Italian irredentism in Nice wanted to create an Italian governorate (on the model of the Governorate of Dalmatia) up to the Var river or at least a "Province of the Western Alps".

Another reduction of Niçard Italians took place after the Second World War, when Italy's defeat in the conflict led to the cession of other territories in the area to France following the Paris treaties. A quarter of the population emigrated to Italy from Val Roia, La Brigue and Tende in 1947.

== Demography ==
A map of the County of Nice showing the area of the Kingdom of Sardinia annexed in 1860 to France (light brown). The red area was already part of France before 1860.

In a historical period that was characterized by nationalism, between 1850 and 1950, Niçard Italians were reduced by the absolute majority (about 70 percent of the resident population of the region, which was about 125,000 inhabitants in 1859) at the time of the annexation to France, to the current minority of about 2,000 inhabitants in the vicinity of Tende and Menton.

Even at the end of the 19th century, the coastal area of Nice was mostly Niçard dialectal (Nice) and Ligurian (Menton/Monte Carlo). There was also the figun dialect to the west of the Var river.

Currently there are numerous residents of Italian nationality in Nice, especially southerners who emigrated after the Second World War. With their descendants, they are about 10 percent of the city population, but they are almost never related to the native Italians of the Savoy era.

== Italian press of the Niçard Italians ==
La Voce di Nizza ("The Nice Voice") was an Italian-language newspaper that was founded around 1800 in Nice. Suppressed following the annexation of Nice to France in 1860, the newspaper was never reinstated.

Il Pensiero di Nizza ("The Thought of Nice") was founded after the fall of Napoleon; it was suppressed by the French authorities in 1895 (35 years after the annexation) on charges of irredentism, while it was almost exclusively autonomist. The major Italian writers of County of Nice collaborated with them: Giuseppe Bres, Enrico Sappia, Giuseppe André and many others.

Fert was a renowned periodical, the voice of the Italians from Nice who took refuge in Italy after the annexation of Nice to France in 1860 and remained active until 1966.

Il Pensiero di Nizza was revived after the Second World War as a periodical and as the voice of the Italian-speaking Nice people by Giulio Vignoli, a Genoese scholar of Italian minorities. In this sheet, in several numbers, the Italian literature of Nice has been summarized, from the early beginnings (16th century) to present day.

== See also ==
- Niçard exodus

== Bibliography ==
- (in Italian) Ermanno Amicucci, Nizza e l'Italia, Rome, Mondadori, 1939.
- (in French) Hervé Barelli, Roger Rocca, Histoire de l'identité niçoise, Nice, Serre, 1995, ISBN 2-86410-223-4.
- (in Italian) Francesco Barberis, Nizza italiana: raccolta di varie poesie italiane e nizzarde, corredate di note, Nice, Sborgi e Guarnieri, 1871.
- (in Italian) Ezio Gray, Le terre nostre ritornano... Malta, Corsica, Nizza, Novara, De Agostini, 1943.
- Edgar Holt, The Making of Italy 1815–1870, New York, Atheneum, 1971.
- (in Italian) Rodogno, Davide. Il nuovo ordine mediterraneo - Le politiche di occupazione dell'Italia fascista in Europa (1940 - 1943), Bollati Boringhieri. Turin, 2003
- (in French) Sappia, Enrico. Nice contemporaine, edited by Alain Rouillier, Nice: France Europe Editions, 2006
- (in Italian) J. Woolf Stuart, Il risorgimento italiano, Turin, Einaudi, 1981.
- (in French) Sophia Antipolis, Les Alpes Maritimes et la frontière 1860 à nos jours - Actes du colloque de Nice (1990), Nice, Université de Nice, Ed. Serre, 1992.
- (in Italian) Giulio Vignoli, Storie e letterature italiane di Nizza e del Nizzardo (e di Briga e di Tenda e del Principato di Monaco), Edizioni Settecolori, Lamezia Terme, 2011.
