= Niçard exodus =

Exodus of ethnic Italians from Nice

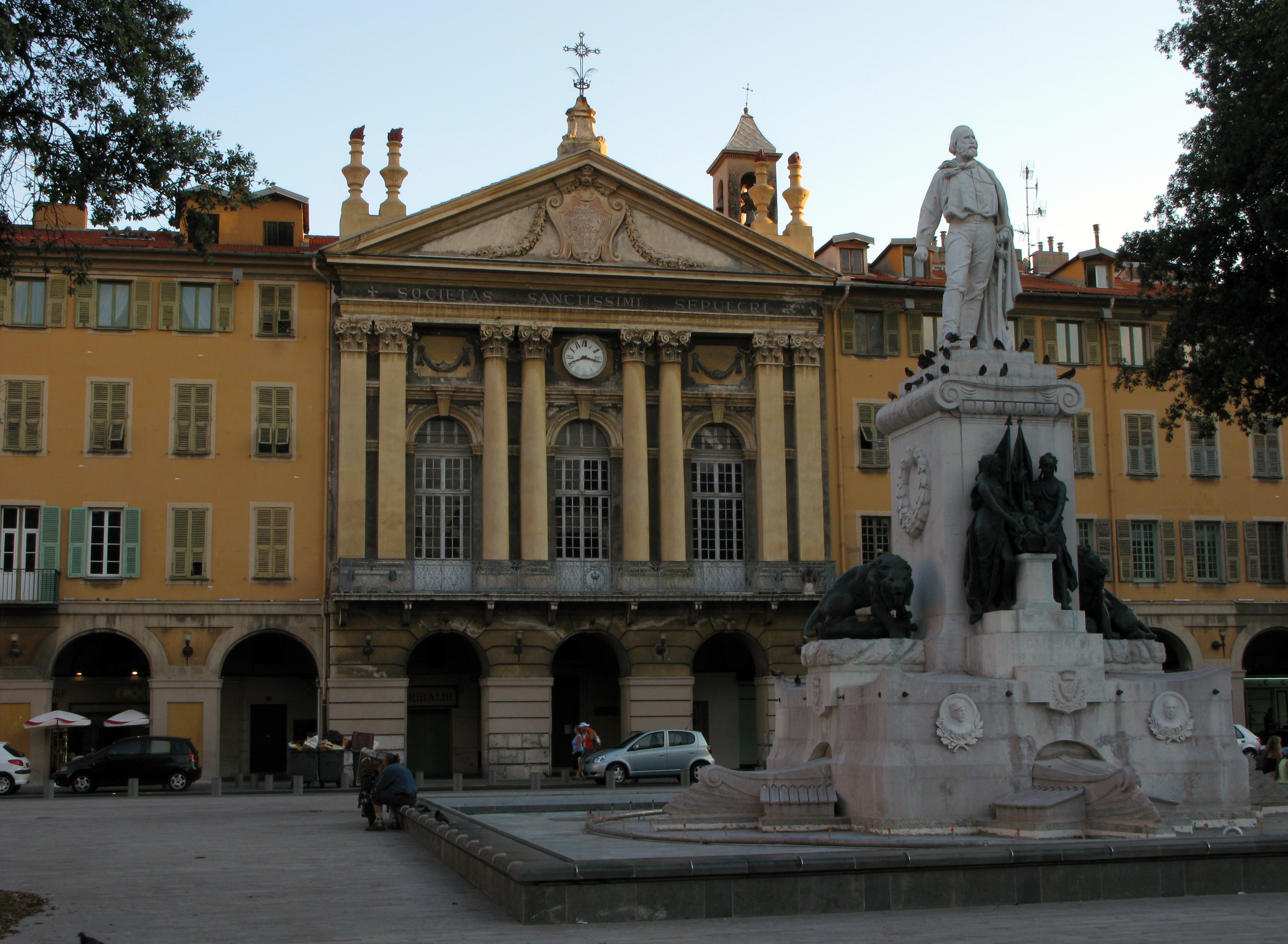
Monument to Giuseppe Garibaldi, a prominent Niçard Italian, in the square of the same name in Nice

The Niçard exodus (Italian: esodo nizzardo [ˈɛːzodo nitˈtsardo]; French: exode niçois [ɛɡzɔd(ə) niswa]) was one of the first emigration phenomena that involved the Italian populations in the contemporary age. It was due to the refusal of a quarter of the Niçard Italians to stay in Nice after its annexation to France in 1861, which was decided after the Plombières Agreement.

== History ==
A map of the County of Nice showing the area of the Kingdom of Sardinia annexed in 1860 to France (light brown). The area in red had already become part of France before 1860.

The exodus took place starting from 1861, concomitantly and following the annexation of Nice and its surroundings from the Kingdom of Sardinia to France. After the Treaty of Turin was signed in 1860 between the Sardinian king and Napoleon III as a consequence of the Plombières Agreement, the county of Nice was ceded to France as a territorial reward for French assistance in the Second Italian War of Independence against Austria, which saw Lombardy united with Piedmont-Sardinia. King Victor-Emmanuel II, on April 1, 1860, solemnly asked the population to accept the change of sovereignty, in the name of Italian unity, and the cession was ratified by a regional referendum. Italophile manifestations and the acclamation of an “Italian Nice” by the crowd are reported on this occasion. These manifestations could not influence the course of events. A plebiscite was voted on April 15 and April 16, 1860. The opponents of annexation called for abstention, hence the very high abstention rate. The “yes” vote won 83% of registered voters throughout the county of Nice and 86% in Nice, partly thanks to pressure from the authorities. This is the result of a masterful operation of information control by the French and Piedmontese governments, in order to influence the outcome of the vote in relation to the decisions already taken. The irregularities in the plebiscite voting operations were evident. The case of Levens is emblematic: the same official sources recorded, faced with only 407 voters, 481 votes cast, naturally almost all in favor of joining France.

The Italian language had been the official language of the county, used by the Church, at the town hall, in theaters and at the Opera, and taught in schools. It was immediately replaced by French as the official language. Discontent over annexation to France led to the emigration of a large part of the Italophile population, also accelerated by Italian unification after 1861. A quarter of the population of Nice, around 11,000 people from Nice, decided to voluntarily exile to Italy. The emigration of a quarter of the Niçard Italians to Italy took the name of Niçard exodus. Many Italians from Nizza then moved to the Ligurian towns of Ventimiglia, Bordighera and Ospedaletti, giving rise to a local branch of the movement of the Italian irredentists which considered the re-acquisition of Nice to be one of their nationalist goals.

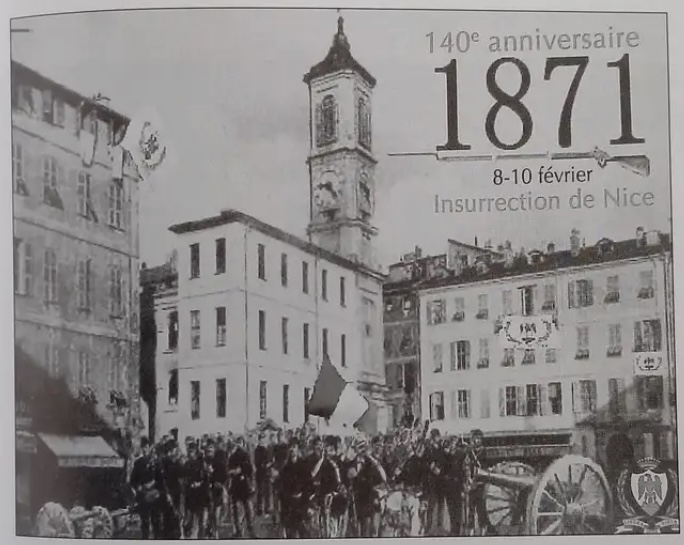
Pro-Italian protests in Nice, 1871, during the Niçard Vespers

Giuseppe Garibaldi, born in Nice, tenaciously opposed the cession of his hometown to France, arguing that the Plebiscite he ratified in the treaty was vitiated by electoral fraud. In 1871, during the first free elections in the county, the pro-Italian lists obtained almost all the votes in the legislative elections (26,534 votes out of 29,428 votes cast), and Garibaldi was elected deputy at the National Assembly. Pro-Italians take to the streets cheering “Viva Nizza! Viva Garibaldi!”. The French government sends 10,000 soldiers to Nice, closes the Italian newspaper Il Diritto di Nizza and imprisons several demonstrators. The population of Nice rose up from February 8 to 10 and the three days of demonstration took the name of "Niçard Vespers". The revolt is suppressed by French troops. On February 13, Garibaldi was not allowed to speak at the French parliament meeting in Bordeaux to ask for the reunification of Nice to the newborn Italian unitary state, and he resigned from his post as deputy. The failure of Vespers led to the expulsion of the last pro-Italian intellectuals from Nice, such as Luciano Mereu or Giuseppe Bres, who were expelled or deported.

The pro-Italian irredentist movement persisted throughout the period 1860–1914, despite the repression carried out since the annexation. The French government implemented a policy of Francization of society, language and culture. The toponyms of the communes of the ancient County have been francized, with the obligation to use French in Nice, as well as certain surnames (for example the Italian surname "Bianchi" was francized into "Leblanc", and the Italian surname "Del Ponte" was francized into "Dupont"). This led to the beginning of the disappearance of the Niçard Italians. Many intellectuals from Nice took refuge in Italy, such as Giovan Battista Bottero who took over the direction of the newspaper La Gazzetta del Popolo in Turin. In 1874, it was the second Italian newspaper by circulation, after Il Secolo in Milan.

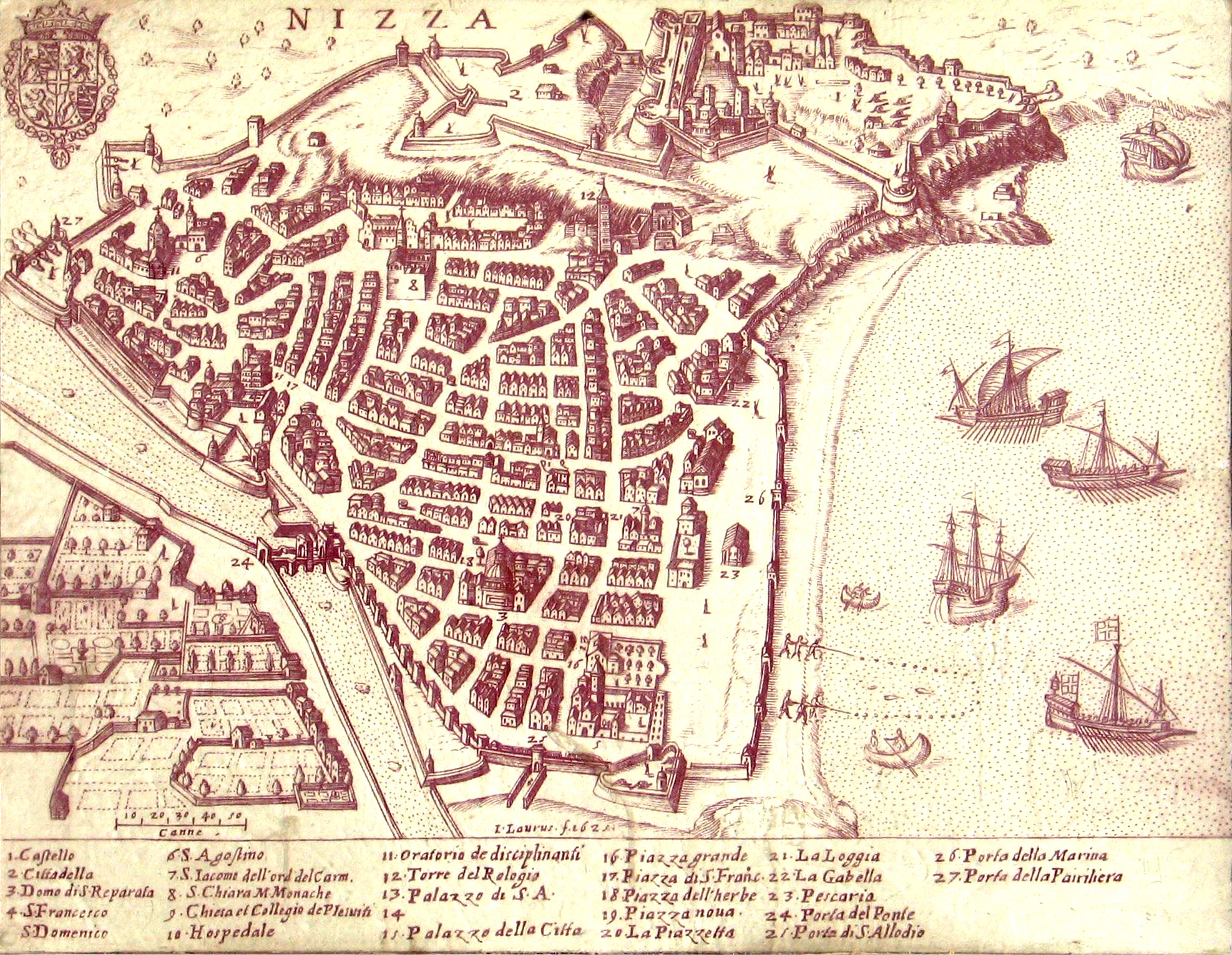
Nice in 1624, when it was called Nizza

Italian-language newspapers in Nice were banned. In 1861, La Voce di Nizza was closed (temporarily reopened during the Niçard Vespers), followed by Il Diritto di Nizza, closed in 1871. In 1895 it was the turn of Il Pensiero di Nizza, accused of irredentism. Many journalists and writers from Nice wrote in these newspapers in Italian. Among these are Enrico Sappia, Giuseppe André, Giuseppe Bres, Eugenio Cais di Pierlas and others.

Another Niçard Italian, Garibaldian Luciano Mereu, was exiled from Nice in November 1870, together with the Garibaldians Adriano Gilli, Carlo Perino and Alberto Cougnet. In 1871, Luciano Mereu was elected City Councilor in Nice during the term of Mayor of Augusto Raynaud (1871–1876) and was a member of the Garibaldi Commission of Nice, whose president was Donato Rasteu. Rasteu remained in office until 1885.

Giuseppe Bres tried to counter the French claim that the Niçard dialect was Occitan and not Italian, publishing his Considerations on Niçard dialect in 1906 in Italy.

During the Italian occupation of Nice in 1942–43, the newspaper of the irredentists from Nice was restored, Il Nizzardo ("The Niçard"). It was directed by Ezio Garibaldi, grandson of Giuseppe Garibaldi. In those years, the periodical Fert was also renowned, the main voice of the Nice refugees in Italy after the annexation of Nice to France in 1861. Until the 1930s, the centre of Nice was still mostly Italian. Today, Italian characters survive in uses, customs and culture mainly along the border areas with Italy.

== See also ==
- Niçard Italians

== Bibliography ==
- (in Italian) Giuseppe André. Nizza negli ultimi quattro anni. A. Gilletta, 1875 (Harvard University)
- (in Italian) Francesco Barberis. Nizza italiana, raccolta di varie poesie italiane e nizzarde. Tip. Sborgi e Guarnieri, Florence, 1871 (University of California)
- (in Italian) Enrico Sappia. Nice contemporaine, a cura di Alain Rouillier, Nice: France Europe Editions, 2006
- (in Italian) Giulio Vignoli. Storie e letterature italiane di Nizza e del Nizzardo (e di Briga e di Tenda e del Principato di Monaco). Settecolori, Lamezia Terme, 2011
