= Italian occupation of France =

Occupation of France by Italy

Italian Military Administration in France Amministrazione militare italiana in Francia (Italian) Administration militaire italienne en France (French)
- Italian military occupation
- 1940–1943
- Flag of Italy Coat of arms

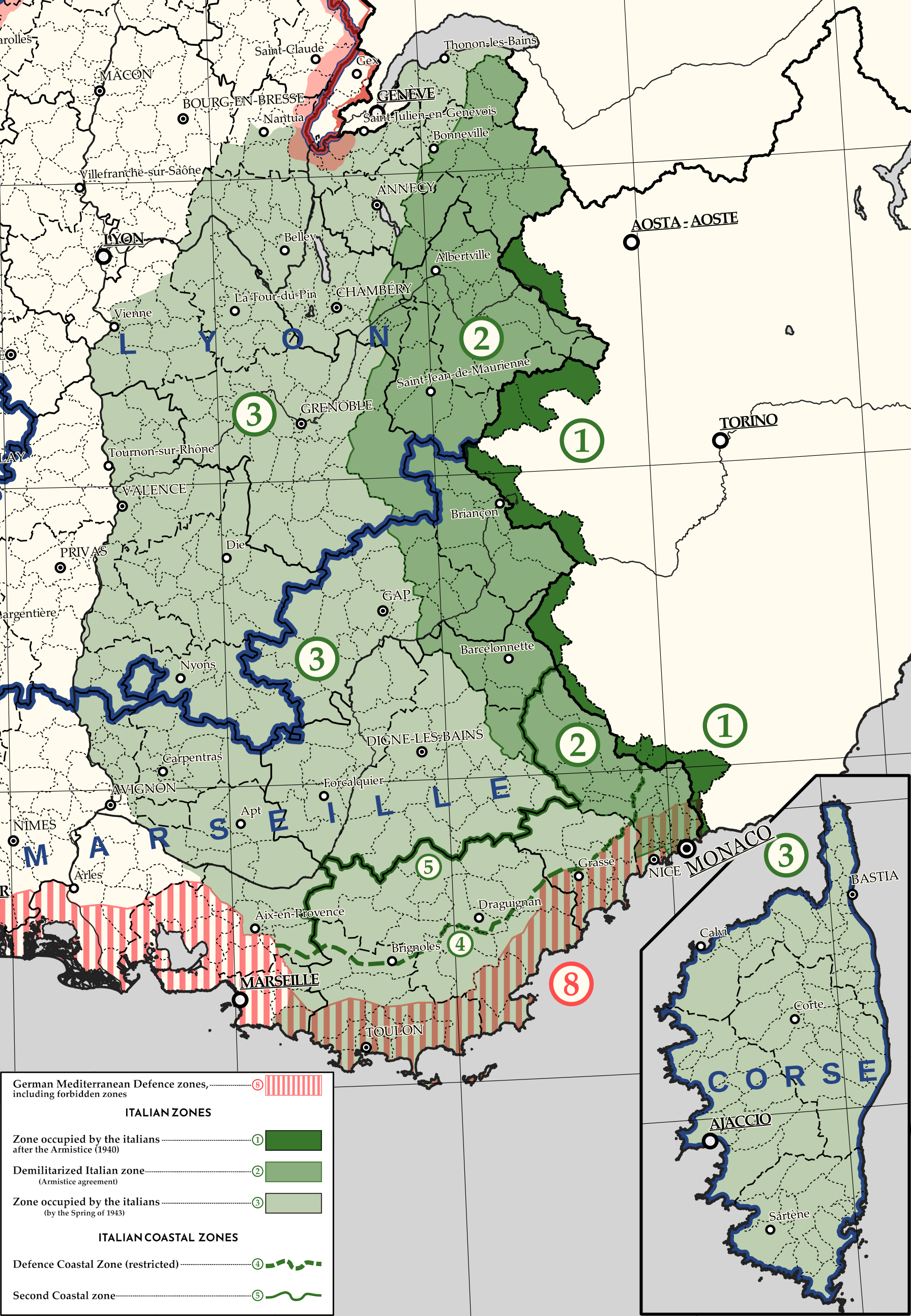
- Capital: Menton
- Government
  - Type: Military administration
- Commander
  - 1940: Alfredo Guzzoni
  - 1940–1941: Mario Caracciolo
  - 1941–1943: Mario Vercellino
- Historical era: World War II
  - Italian invasion: 10 June 1940
  - Franco-Italian Armistice: 24 June 1940
  - Case Anton: 11 November 1942
  - Italian surrender: 8 September 1943
Preceded by	Succeeded by
1940: French Third Republic; 1942: French State	German Military Administration

Italy occupied an area of south-eastern France and Monaco between 1940 and 1943 in parallel to the German occupation of France. The occupation had two phases, divided by Case Anton in November 1942 in which the Italian zone expanded significantly. Italian forces retreated from France in September 1943 in the aftermath of the fall of the Fascist regime in Italy, and German Wehrmacht forces occupied the abandoned areas until the Liberation (Operation Dragoon, 1944).

== Italian occupation ==
The initial Italian occupation of French territory occurred in June 1940; it was then expanded in November 1942.

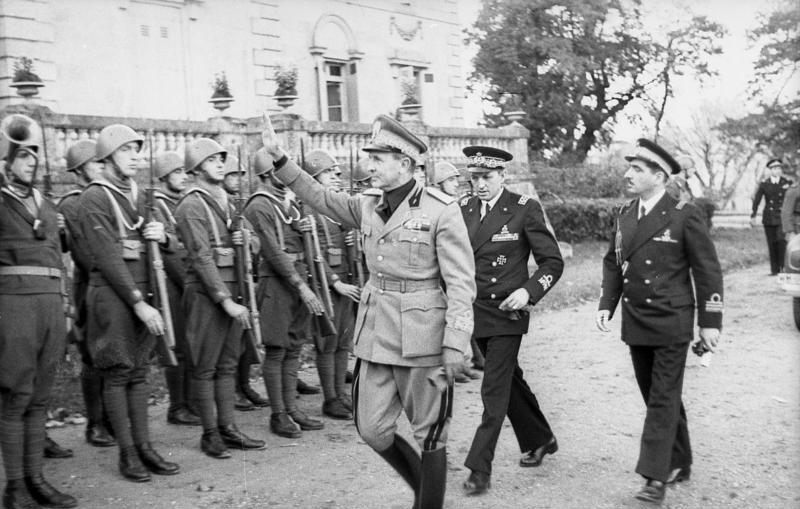
Italian soldiers of the San Marco Regiment in occupied France (1942)

The German offensive against the Low Countries and France began on 10 May and by the middle of May German forces were on French soil. By the start of June, British forces were evacuating from the pocket in Northern France. On 10 June 1940, Italy declared war against the French and British. Ten days later, the Italian army invaded France. On 24 June 1940, after the Fall of France, Italy and France signed the Franco-Italian Armistice, two days after the cessation of hostilities between France and Germany, agreeing upon an Italian zone of occupation.

This initial zone of occupation assigned to the Kingdom of Italy (which was also de facto annexed) was 832 square kilometres (321 sq mi) and contained 28,500 inhabitants. The largest town contained within the initial Italian zone of occupation was Menton. The main city inside the "demilitarized zone" of 50 km (31 mi) from the former border with the Italian Alpine Wall was Nice.

In November 1942, in conjunction with Case Anton, the German occupation of Vichy France, the Royal Italian Army (Regio Esercito) expanded its occupation zone. Italian forces took control of Toulon and all of Provence up to the river Rhône, with the island of Corsica (claimed by the Italian irredentists). Nice and Corsica were to be annexed to Italy (as had happened in 1940 with Menton), in order to fulfil the aspirations of Italian irredentists (including local groups such as the Nizzardo Italians and the Corsican Italians). But this was not completed because of the Italian armistice in September 1943 when the Germans took over the Italian occupation zones.

The area of southeast France actually occupied by the Italians has been disputed. A study of the postal history of the region has cast new light on the part of France controlled by the Italians and the Germans (Trapnell, 2014). By studying mail that had been censored by the occupying power, this study showed that the Italians occupied the eastern part up to a "line" joining Toulon - Gap - Grenoble - Chambéry - Annecy - Geneva. Places occupied by the Italians west of this were few or transitory.

== Characteristics ==
The Italian Army of occupation in southern France in November 1942 was made up of four infantry divisions with 136,000 soldiers and 6,000 officers, while in Corsica there were 66,000 soldiers with 3,000 officers. There was virtually no guerrilla war against the Italians in France until summer 1943. The Vichy regime that controlled southern France was friendly toward Italy, seeking concessions of the sort Germany would never make in its occupation zone.

== Refuge ==
Many thousands of Jews moved to the Italian zone of occupation to escape Nazi persecution in Vichy France. Nearly 80% of the remaining 300,000 French Jews took refuge there after November 1942. The book Robert O. Paxton's Vichy France, Old Guard, New Order describes how the Italian zone acted as a refuge for Jews fleeing persecution in Vichy France during the occupation.

The Italian Jewish banker Angelo Donati had an important role in convincing the Italian civil and military authorities to protect the Jews from French persecution.

In January 1943 the Italians refused to cooperate with the Nazis in rounding up the Jews living in the occupied zone of France under their control and in March prevented the Nazis from deporting Jews in their zone. German foreign minister Joachim von Ribbentrop complained to Mussolini that "Italian military circles... lack a proper understanding of the Jewish question."

However, when the Italians signed the armistice with the Allies, German troops invaded the former Italian zone on 8 September 1943 and initiated brutal raids. Alois Brunner, the SS official for Jewish affairs, was placed at the head of units formed to search out Jews. Within five months, 5,000 Jews were caught and deported.

== Bordeaux ==
In August 1940, the Italian Royal Navy (Regia Marina) established a submarine base at Bordeaux, outside Italian-occupied France.

Operating from Bordeaux Sommergibile ("BETASOM") as it was known, thirty-two Italian submarines participated in the Battle of the Atlantic. These submarines sank 109 Allied merchant ships (593,864 tons) and 18 warships (20,000 tons) up to September 1943. Eleven of these submarines were lost.

== Italian territorial claims ==
Plan A: Annexation of Nice and Corsica plus military occupation up to the Rhône River. Plan B: Annexation of Nice, Corsica and Alpine regions of France. Creation of the province Alpi Occidentali with Briançon/Brianzone as capital.

In addition to Nice/Nizza and Corsica, the Italians projected further territorial claims for the defeated France. In 1940, the Italian Armistice Commission (Commissione Italiana d'Armistizio con la Francia, CIAF) produced two detailed plans concerning the future of the occupied French territories. Plan 'A' presented an Italian military occupation all the way to the river Rhone, in which France would maintain its territorial integrity except for Corsica and Nizza. Plan 'B', proposed by senator Francesco Salata, the director of a section of the ISPI dedicated to Italian territorial claims, encompassed the Italian annexation of the Alpes Maritimes (including the Principality of Monaco) and parts of Alpes-de-Haute-Provence, Hautes Alpes and Savoie. The territory would be administered as the new Italian region of Alpi Occidentali with the town of Briançon (Italian: Brianzone) acting as the provincial capital.

== In popular fiction ==
- The 1961 French film Léon Morin, Priest includes scenes of Alpini and Bersaglieri occupying a French Alpine town. There is also a reference to the Italians fighting the Germans in the town after the Italian armistice with the Allies. Director Jean-Pierre Melville, who belonged to the Resistance, called Beatrix Beck's autobiographical novel "the most accurate picture I have read of life under the Occupation."

== See also ==
- Alpine Line
- Alpine Wall
- France–Italy relations
- Italian invasion of France
- Italian-occupied Corsica
- Military history of Italy during World War II
