= Gazzetta del Popolo =

Italian daily newspaper

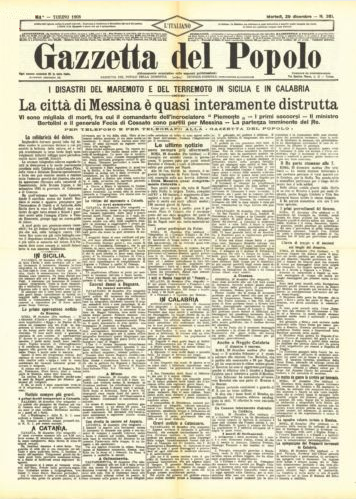

Gazzetta del Popolo was an Italian daily newspaper founded in Turin, in northern Italy, on 16 June 1848. It ceased publication on 31 December 1983 after 135 years of operation. Italian novelist Alberto Moravia is among the former contributors to the paper.
