= Plombières Agreement =

1858 secret agreement between Piedmont-Sardinia and France

Borders of Italy at the time of the Plombières Agreement

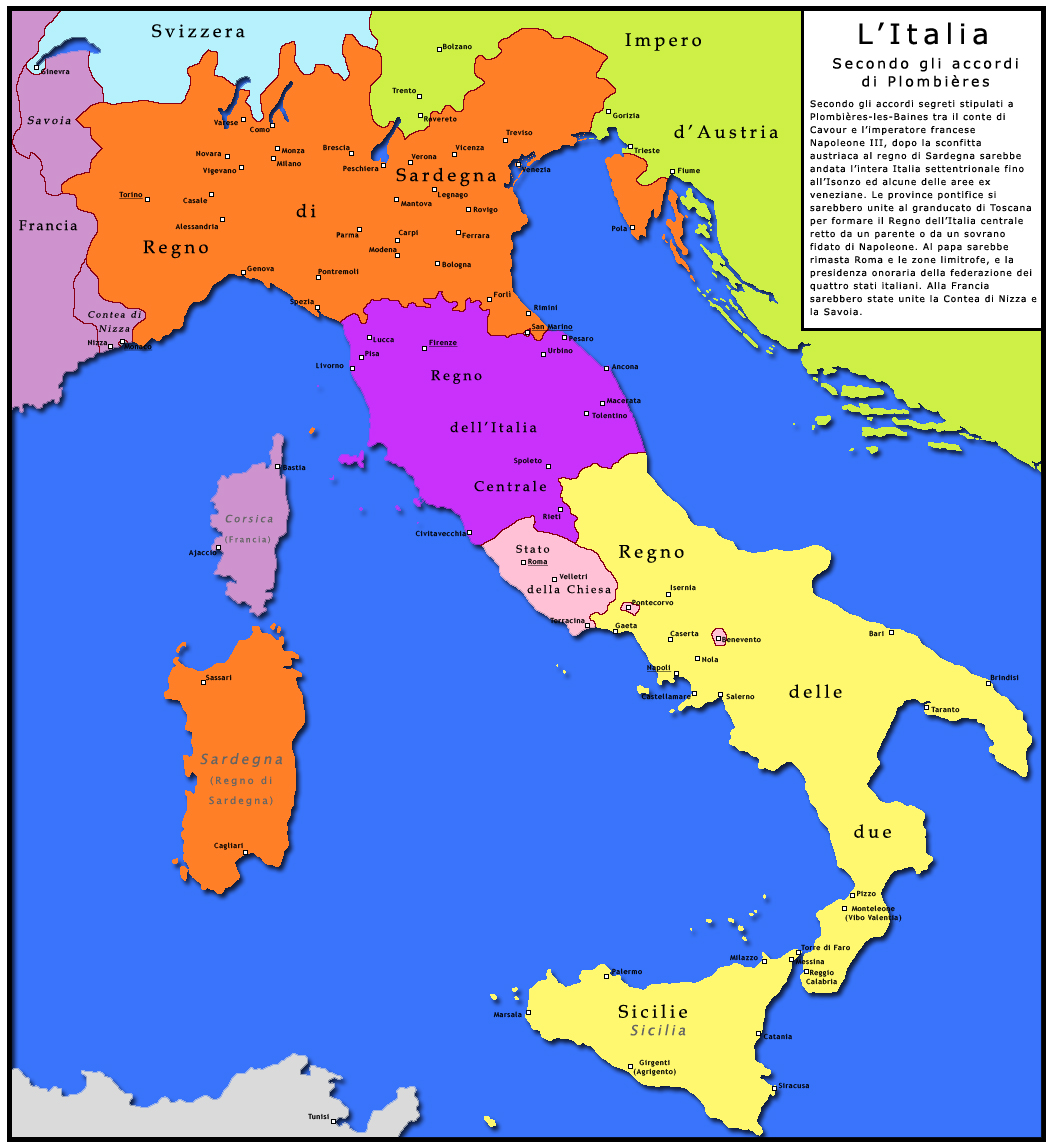
Italian borders believed to have been envisaged by the Plombières Agreement

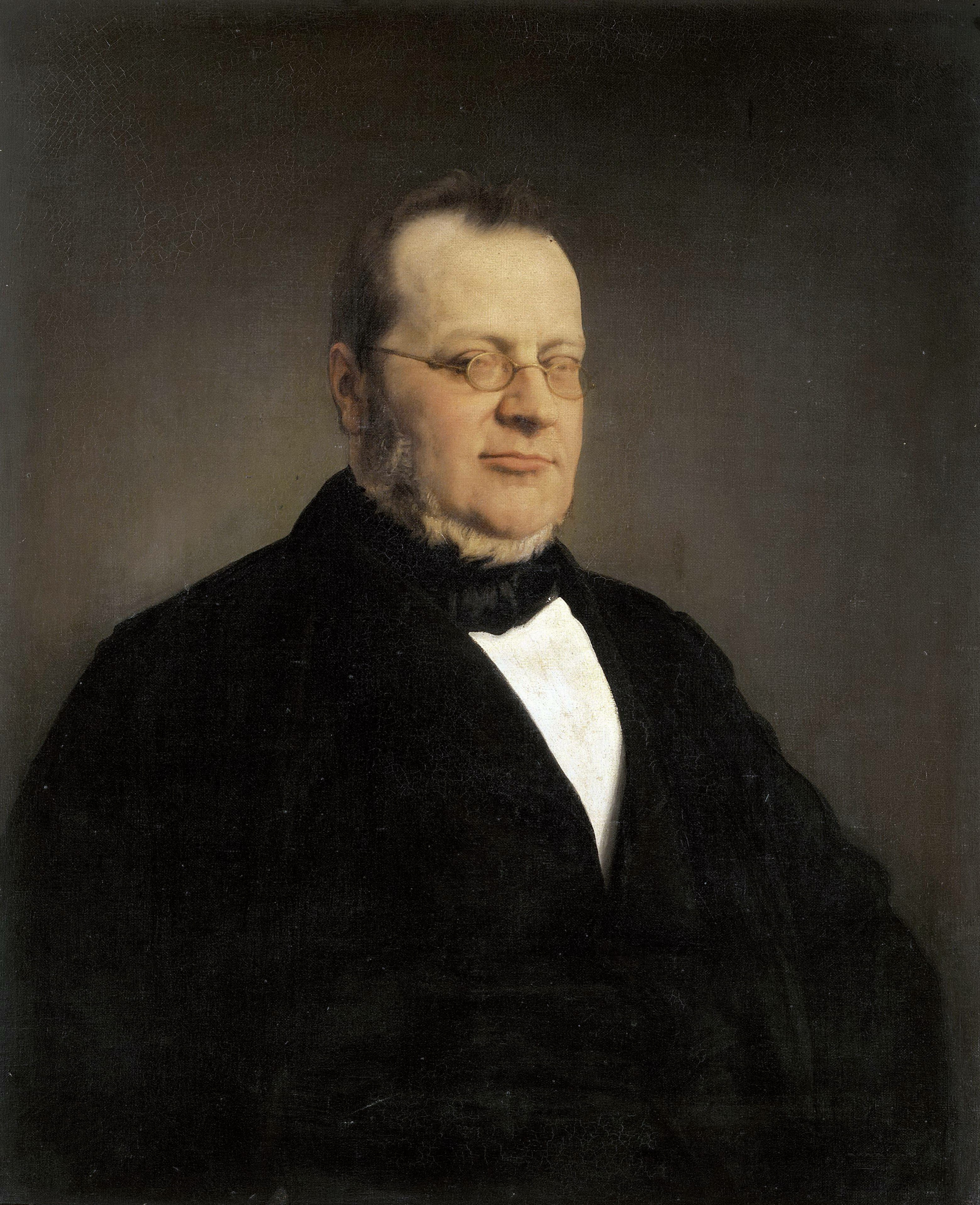
Portrait of the Count of Cavour

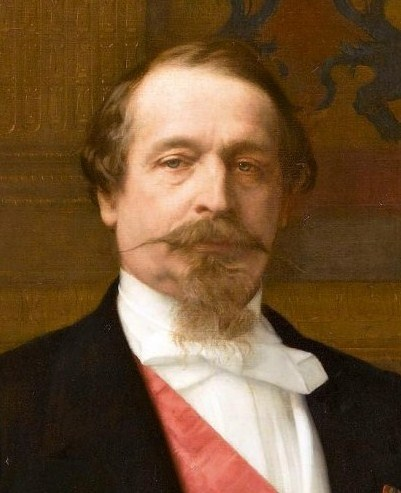
Emperor Napoleon III in 1865

The Plombières Agreement (Italian: Accordi di Plombières; French: Entrevue de Plombières) of 21 July 1858 was a secret verbal agreement that took place at Plombières-les-Bains between the chief minister of Piedmont-Sardinia, Camillo Benso, Count of Cavour, and the French Emperor, Napoleon III. Some older English sources refer to it as the Treaty of Plombières. In modern times, it is merely referred to as an "agreement", since nothing was signed.

Based on limited available evidence, there have been disputes on the details of what was agreed upon at the meeting, but as years passed it became apparent that the agreement had opened the way for the Franco-Piedmontese military alliance, on 28 January 1859, and for the Second Italian War of Independence that became a vital step towards Italian unification, which was achieved within a decade of the agreement.

The Plombières Agreement was an agreement concerning a future war in which France and Piedmont would ally themselves against Austria to remove and exclude Austrian influence from the Italian peninsula. In its place, Italy, which Klemens von Metternich, a previous Austrian chancellor, had reportedly dismissed on various occasions as a "[mere] geographical expression", would be divided into two spheres of influence to be dominated respectively by Piedmont and France. As events turned out, the war was triggered as agreed at Plombières, but its geopolitical aftermath was not precisely the one that had been envisaged.

== The French position ==
Emperor Napoleon III was keen to settle the "Italian question" and to revise the humiliations of the 1815 Congress of Vienna. He had long ago formed the view that this required a war against Austria. War with Austria could bring France military success, delivering glory to France and humiliation to Austria. Actively supporting Italian nationalist aspirations would place France firmly on the side of what was then seen as progressive liberalism, and confirm the nation's special revolutionary credentials. For France, however, Italian independence and Italian political unification were two very different things. Political unification would have been contrary to French interests because it would have risked reducing French influence on the Italian peninsula.

== Count of Cavour's opportunity ==
The prime minister of Piedmont-Sardinia, Camillo Benso, Count of Cavour, was aware of the French objectives and was looking for an opportunity to serve these, while simultaneously achieving his goal of lifting the oppressive burden of Austrian rule from as many Italians as possible.

The arrival in Turin of Jacques Alexandre Bixio in April 1858 provided Cavour with his opportunity. Bixio was a retired physician, originally from Liguria, with a taste for politics and ballooning: he had made his life in France. Bixio was a friend both of Cavour and of Prince Napoléon-Jérôme Bonaparte, cousin to the French Emperor. His presence in Turin was ostensibly part of a discreet European tour, visiting various European royal families to find a socially suitable wife for the Emperor's cousin.

Bixio was also able to pass to his friend, the Piedmontese chief minister, French proposals for an alliance of the two states against Austria. The agreement would be reinforced through the marriage of Princess Maria Clotilde of Savoy, daughter of the Piedmontese king, Victor Emmanuel II, to Prince Napoléon-Jérôme.

Reflecting the international sensitivities involved, negotiations progressed outside the "usual" diplomatic channels. To confirm his approval of the proposal, Cavour sent his emissary, Costantino Nigra, to Paris, where Nigra made contact with another friend and confidant of the Emperor (and another physician) called Henri Conneau. On 9 May 1858, Conneau was able to confirm to Nigra that the alliance proposal had the full support of the Emperor himself. Further talks now took place in Turin involving Conneau, Cavour, and King Victor Emmanuel. At this point, a suggestion came from the Emperor for a meeting between himself and Cavour at Plombières-les-Bains, a fashionable health resort in the valley of the Augronne in the Vosges, reassuringly far from Paris or Turin, and off the beaten track of those following international diplomacy and politics.

== The meeting ==
On 11 July 1858 Count Cavour left Turin, letting it be known that he was heading for Switzerland. Only the King and the Piedmontese military commander, General La Marmora, were aware that his final destination was Plombières, where nine days later the Piedmontese prime minister arrived on the evening of 20 July 1858.

There is no surviving source for the meeting from Napoleon III. The only direct report of the discussions comes from Cavour. Cavour's report takes the form of a letter that he wrote to the King on 24 July 1858 from an overnight halt at Baden-Baden, while on his way home. This letter was made public in 1883 in La Perseveranza, a Milanese newspaper.

The meeting itself took place on 21 July 1858, with a first four-hour session starting at 11:00 and a second session running from 16:00 until 20:00. It was a Tuesday. The venue was a moving one: the two men sat together, without support staff, in a small horse-drawn carriage as it undertook a slow passage round and round the little town.

=== Searching for a casus belli ===
Neither man wanted the blame for causing the impending war. Cavour noted that Napoleon began by stating that he was determined to support Piedmont-Sardinia with all his strength in a war against Austria, on the condition that the war was not in support of a revolutionary cause and could be justified in diplomatic terms and, more importantly, before public opinion in France and in Europe.

Violations of trade treaty obligations by Austria were considered by Napoleon to be insufficient grounds for a war. There was discussion of whether the presence of an Austrian military garrison in Bologna (in the Papal States) might justify war against Austria, but the French Emperor was in the end reluctant to use this as a pretext. There were Austrian troops not only in Bologna, but also in Rome and the Papal States, preserving the status quo; in Rome, there were also French troops for broadly similar reasons, and parallels between the garrisoning of Bologna and of Rome were uncomfortably close.

It then transpired that Napoleon had a proposal of his own. The Duchy of Modena and Reggio presented a more promising casus belli. Its ruler was Francis V, an Austrian ally and one of the many great-grandsons of the eighteenth-century Empress Maria Theresa. Francis had decided not to acknowledge Napoleon III as emperor of France following the latter's coup d'état at the start of the decade. Francis of Modena had inadvertently set himself up as eminently dispensable in the eyes of Napoleon. As they traveled round the streets of Plombières, Cavour and Napoleon devised a plan to provoke an appeal for protection from the Modenese citizens to the king of Piedmont-Sardinia, and a demand for the annexation of their duchy to Piedmont-Sardinia. The co-operation of the Modenese citizenry in such a scheme seems never to have been in doubt. The king of Piedmont-Sardinia would respond by graciously declining the appeal in the terms in which it was put, but he would nevertheless send a threatening communication to Francis V of Modena. The communication would be seen as interference in the Austrian sphere of influence and would provoke outrage in Vienna. As such, Austria's response would be correspondingly provocative. Piedmont-Sardinia would then find itself obliged to occupy Massa, a coastal city and an important port belonging to the Duchy of Modena, by which time a wider war with Austria would have been triggered.

=== A political structure for Italy ===
Napoleon III stated that the Austrians must be completely ejected from the Italian peninsula, and Cavour agreed. The discussion then moved on to agreement on a political structure for the Italian peninsula following the removal of Austria.

- The existing Kingdom of Piedmont-Sardinia, together with the agriculturally rich Po Valley to the Soča river, and along with the entire northern (Romagna) part of the Papal States (the so-called "Papal Legations"), would become the Kingdom of Upper Italy ("Alta Italia"), under the king of Piedmont-Sardinia ("...sotto la guida di Vittorio Emanuele").
- The southern part of the Papal States, with the exception of Rome and its immediate surrounds, was to be merged with the Grand Duchy of Tuscany in order to create a Kingdom of Central Italy ("Regno dell’Italia centrale"). The grand duke of Tuscany, Leopold II, another Austrian ally and great-grandson of Maria Theresa, would need to go. He would be replaced, at least on a provisional basis, by the (originally Francophone) Duchess of Parma Louise Marie of Artois. Napoleon had domestic reasons for displaying magnanimity to a descendant of the former Bourbon ruling dynasty: the appeal of traditional monarchism was far from dead in France.
- Rome and its immediate surroundings would continue to be ruled by the Pope.
- Further south, the Kingdom of the Two Sicilies should remain under the control of its existing king, Ferdinand II. Were Ferdinand to be removed from the scene the Emperor would be very happy for his successor to be his relative, Prince Lucien Murat. (Ferdinand II was known to be unwell: he would die within a year.)

These four Italian states would have formed a confederation, modeled on the German Confederation, of which the honorary presidency would be given to the Pope.

=== The French price ===
As Cavour later reported to his king,

"The Emperor asked me what France would get in return for her military backing, and whether Your Majesty would hand over Savoy and Nice to France. I replied that Your Majesty supported the principle of nationalism, which included recognition that Savoy, by virtue of being French-speaking, should be united with France ... even though it would cause your majesty untold unhappiness to renounce a territory that was the cradle of his own family. Regarding Nice, the situation was different, since the inhabitants of Nice had far more in common with the Piedmontese than with the French, and their incorporation into France would accordingly be entirely contrary to those very principles of nationalism underpinning the military triumph anticipated against Austria."

Napoleon now stroked his moustache and indicated that these nationality issues were perhaps not quite such a priority for now. The political future of Nice could be settled on another occasion. He moved on to how the alliances might line up in a future war. British neutrality could be secured with the help of Piedmontese diplomacy, Prussia would abstain despite an adversarial perspective in respect to Austria, and Russia would abstain albeit from a pro-Austrian position.

On the matter of force levels for the war, the Piedmontese military commander Alfonso Ferrero La Marmora had produced a plan involving an army of 160,000 men, provided 50:50 by France and Piedmont-Sardinia, and a military campaign focused on the Po Valley. The emperor had his plan, however, involving 300,000 men of whom 200,000 would be French, and he spoke in terms of a military campaign pushing right through to Vienna.

=== The dynastic marriage ===
After a mid-afternoon break, the two climbed back into their little carriage around five o'clock. The Emperor turned to the proposed marriage of his cousin, Prince Napoléon-Jérôme Bonaparte, to Victor Emmanuel's eldest daughter.

Cavour had already been fully briefed by his king on this matter. He highlighted the unfortunate rumours in circulation about the character of Prince Napoléon-Jérôme and also drew attention to the age of the Princess, who was only fifteen. In the report he wrote to the King three days after the meeting, Cavour was nevertheless keen to stress the merits of the proposed marriage. The nature of future political and military alliances would be transformed if created without the underpinning of the marriage on which Napoleon was so keen. Pursuing the alliance without the marriage would be an enormous political error.

The meeting ended with a handshake, accompanied by the Emperor's injunction: "Abbiate fiducia in me, come io ho fiducia in voi". ("Have faith in me, as I have faith in you.")

== Objectives ==
It appears from Cavour's report of the meeting that Napoleon III had prepared very carefully for it, and dictated the terms of the secret "Plombières Agreement" that resulted. Piedmont-Sardinia might be a regional power in terms of the Po Valley, but France was a European great power. Nevertheless, Cavour was entirely upbeat over the agreement. The tensions between the disparate objectives and expectations of the parties are nevertheless clear. Cavour believed that by controlling "Italia Alta", the Northern Italian Kingdom, Piedmont-Sardinia would have practical political and economic control over the entire Italian peninsula. In contrast, Napoleon was convinced that France would have control over the southern two-thirds of Italy and would thereby be able to exercise de facto control over Piedmont-Sardinia. They could not both be right.

== Consequences ==
=== The Franco-Sardinian Treaty ===
The treaty creating a formal alliance was signed on 28/29 January 1859 at Turin by Victor Emmanuel II and at Paris on 26 January 1859 by Napoleon III.

Not everything agreed verbally at Plombières six months before surfaced in the treaty: it was silent on the geopolitical understandings covering central and southern Italy. On the military side, the treaty merely committed France to intervene alongside Piedmont-Sardinia in the event of aggression from Austria. If the fighting ended with the creation of "Alta Italia", the northern Italian kingdom envisaged at Plombières, France would receive Savoy and Nice.

On 30 January 1859, Prince Napoléon-Jérôme Bonaparte and Princess Maria Clotilde of Savoy were married at Turin.

=== The war ===
Following a series of provocative military movements near the Austro-Piedmontese frontier by Piedmont-Sardinia, and having become aware of the Franco-Sardinian alliance, the Austrians took the initiative by issuing the Ultimatum of Vienna on 23 April 1859. The Austrian ultimatum required the total demobilisation of the Royal Sardinian Army. By failing to comply with this demand, the Piedmontese triggered a declaration of war by Austria, thereby fulfilling the French condition that their support for Piedmont-Sardinia would be contingent on Austria being the aggressor in any war.

A succession of serious regional anti-Austrian pro-nationalist insurrections now broke out in Tuscany, Modena, Parma and the Papal States. Napoleon III concluded that his earlier plan to secure French domination of central and southern Italy through his alliance with Piedmont-Sardinia could only be achieved at an unacceptable military and economic cost. On a personal level, he seems to have been genuinely (and very publicly) horrified by the slaughter involved in fighting wars in an industrial age, notably at the battles of Magenta and Solferino.

He was also aware of the risk to French security from an ambitious and opportunistic Prussia in the event of France becoming over-committed militarily in Italy. He, therefore, hastened to sign an armistice with Austria. The French and the Austrians signed the Armistice of Villafranca without consulting the Piedmontese, provoking outrage and rioting in the streets of Turin.

Under the terms agreed at Villafranca between France and Austria, most of Lombardy was transferred from Austria to France. France immediately transferred these territories to Piedmont-Sardinia, receiving Savoy and Nice in return. This left the central Italian states, notably Tuscany and the Papal States, to be returned to the control of their former Austrian client-rulers. However, these central Italian territories were now occupied by Piedmontese troops who showed no enthusiasm for the idea of restoring Austrian-sponsored rulers. The French themselves had no wish or incentive to provide practical military or other support to the Austrians for such a restoration in defiance of their alliance with Piedmont. In practical terms, therefore, following the so-called Second Italian War of Independence, the Piedmontese retained control of both Italia Alta, the northern Italian kingdom agreed at Plombières, and of central Italy; paving the way for Italian unification to be fully realized twelve years later.
