= Foreign relations of Italy =

The foreign relations of the Italian Republic are the Italian government's external relations with the outside world. Located in Europe, Italy has been considered a major European power since its unification in 1860. Its main allies are the NATO countries and the EU states, two entities of which Italy is a founding member. Italy was admitted to the United Nations in 1955, and it is a member and a strong supporter of a wide number of international organisations, such as the Organisation for Economic Co-operation and Development (OECD), the General Agreement on Tariffs and Trade and World Trade Organization (GATT and WTO), the Organization for Security and Co-operation in Europe (OSCE), the Council of Europe, and the Central European Initiative.

Its turns in the rotating presidency of international organisations include the Organization for Security and Co-operation in Europe, the G7 and the EU Council. Italy is also a recurrent non-permanent member of the UN Security Council. Italy is an important actor in the Mediterranean region and has close relations with the Romance-speaking countries in Europe and Latin America. Although it is a secular state, Rome hosts the Pope and the headquarters of the Catholic Church, which operates a large diplomatic system of its own. Italy is currently commanding various multinational forces and has significant troops deployed all over the world for peacekeeping missions, and for combating organized crime, illegal drug trade, human trafficking, piracy and terrorism.

== History ==
=== National unification ===
Animated map of the Italian unification from 1829 to 1871

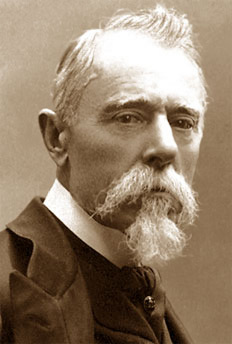
Ernesto Teodoro Moneta was awarded the Nobel Peace Prize in 1907 for an understanding between France and Italy. He adopted the motto In varietate unitas! which later inspired Motto of the European Union.

The Risorgimento was the era from 1829 to 1871 that saw the emergence of a national consciousness. The Northern Italy monarchy of the House of Savoy in the Kingdom of Sardinia, whose government was led by Camillo Benso, Count of Cavour, had ambitions of establishing a united Italian state. In the context of the 1848 liberal revolutions that swept through Europe, an unsuccessful first war of independence was declared on Austria. In 1855, the Kingdom of Sardinia became an ally of Britain and France in the Crimean War, giving Cavour's diplomacy legitimacy in the eyes of the great powers. The Kingdom of Sardinia again attacked the Austrian Empire in the Second Italian War of Independence of 1859, with the aid of France, resulting in liberating Lombardy. On the basis of the Plombières Agreement, the Kingdom of Sardinia ceded Savoy and Nice to France, an event that caused the Niçard exodus, that was the emigration of a quarter of the Niçard Italians to Italy, and the Niçard Vespers.

In 1860–1861, Giuseppe Garibaldi led the drive for unification in Naples and Sicily conquering the Kingdom of the Two Sicilies (the Expedition of the Thousand), while the House of Savoy troops occupied the central territories of the Italian peninsula, except Rome and part of Papal States. This allowed the Sardinian government to declare a united Italian kingdom on 17 March 1861. In 1866, Italy allied with Prussia during the Austro-Prussian War, waging the Third Italian War of Independence which allowed Italy to annex Venetia.

After the Third Italian War of Independence (1866), when the Veneto and Friuli regions were ceded by the Austrians to the newly formed Kingdom Italy, Istria and Dalmatia remained part of the Austro-Hungarian Empire, together with other Italian-speaking areas on the eastern Adriatic. This triggered the gradual rise of Italian irredentism among many Italians in Istria, Kvarner and Dalmatia, who demanded the unification of the Julian March, Kvarner and Dalmatia with Italy. The Italians in Istria, Kvarner and Dalmatia supported the Italian Risorgimento: as a consequence, the Austrians saw the Italians as enemies and favored the Slav communities of Istria, Kvarner and Dalmatia. During the meeting of the Council of Ministers of 12 November 1866, Emperor Franz Joseph I of Austria outlined a wide-ranging project aimed at the Germanization or Slavization of the areas of the empire with an Italian presence:

His Majesty expressed the precise order that action be taken decisively against the influence of the Italian elements still present in some regions of the Crown and, appropriately occupying the posts of public, judicial, masters employees as well as with the influence of the press, work in South Tyrol, Dalmatia and Littoral for the Germanization and Slavization of these territories according to the circumstances, with energy and without any regard. His Majesty calls the central offices to the strong duty to proceed in this way to what has been established.

— Franz Joseph I of Austria, Council of the Crown of 12 November 1866

Finally, in 1870, as France abandoned its garrisons in Rome during the disastrous Franco-Prussian War to keep the large Prussian Army at bay, the Italians rushed to fill the power gap by taking over the Papal States. Italian unification was completed and shortly afterwards Italy's capital was moved to Rome. Later Italy formed the Triple Alliance (1882) with Germany and Austria.

=== World War I ===
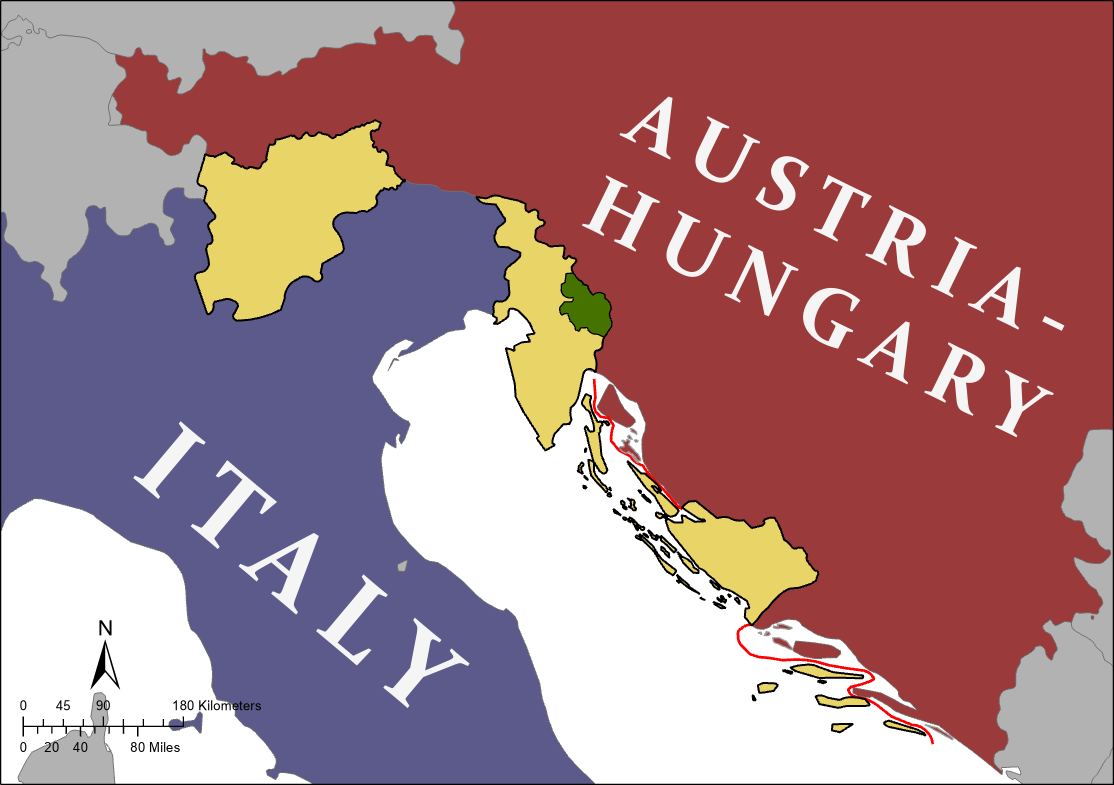
Territories promised to Italy by the Treaty of London (1915), i.e. Trentino-Alto Adige, Julian March and Dalmatia (tan), and the Snežnik Plateau area (green). Dalmatia, after the WWI, however, was not assigned to Italy but to Yugoslavia.

Even after 1870, after the unification of Italy, many ethnic Italian-speakers (Italians in Trentino-Alto Adige/Südtirol, Savoyard Italians, Corfiot Italians, Niçard Italians, Swiss Italians, Corsican Italians, Maltese Italians, Istrian Italians, and Dalmatian Italians) remained outside the borders of the Kingdom of Italy, planting the seeds of Italian irredentism.

Italy entered into the World War I in 1915 with the aim of completing national unity: for this reason, the Italian intervention in the World War I is also considered the Fourth Italian War of Independence, in a historiographical perspective that identifies in the latter the conclusion of the unification of Italy, whose military actions began during the revolutions of 1848 with the First Italian War of Independence.

Italy defeated the Ottoman Empire in 1911–1912. By 1915, Italy had acquired in Africa a colony on the Red Sea coast (Eritrea), a large protectorate in Somalia and administrative authority in formerly Turkish Libya. Outside of Africa, Italy possessed a small concession in Tientsin in China (following the Boxer Rebellion) and the Dodecanese Islands off the coast of Turkey.

In 1915, Italy abrogated its alliance and declared war on the Austro-Hungarian Empire, leading to bloody conflict mainly on the Isonzo and Piave fronts. Britain, France and Russia had been "keen to bring neutral Italy into World War I on their side. However, Italy drove a hard bargain, demanding extensive territorial concessions once the war had been won". In a deal to bring Italy into the war, under the London Pact, Italy would be allowed to annex not only Italian-speaking Trentino and Trieste, but also German-speaking South Tyrol, Istria (which included large non-Italian communities), and the northern part of Dalmatia including the areas of Zadar (Zara) and Šibenik (Sebenico). Mainly Italian Fiume (present-day Rijeka) was excluded.

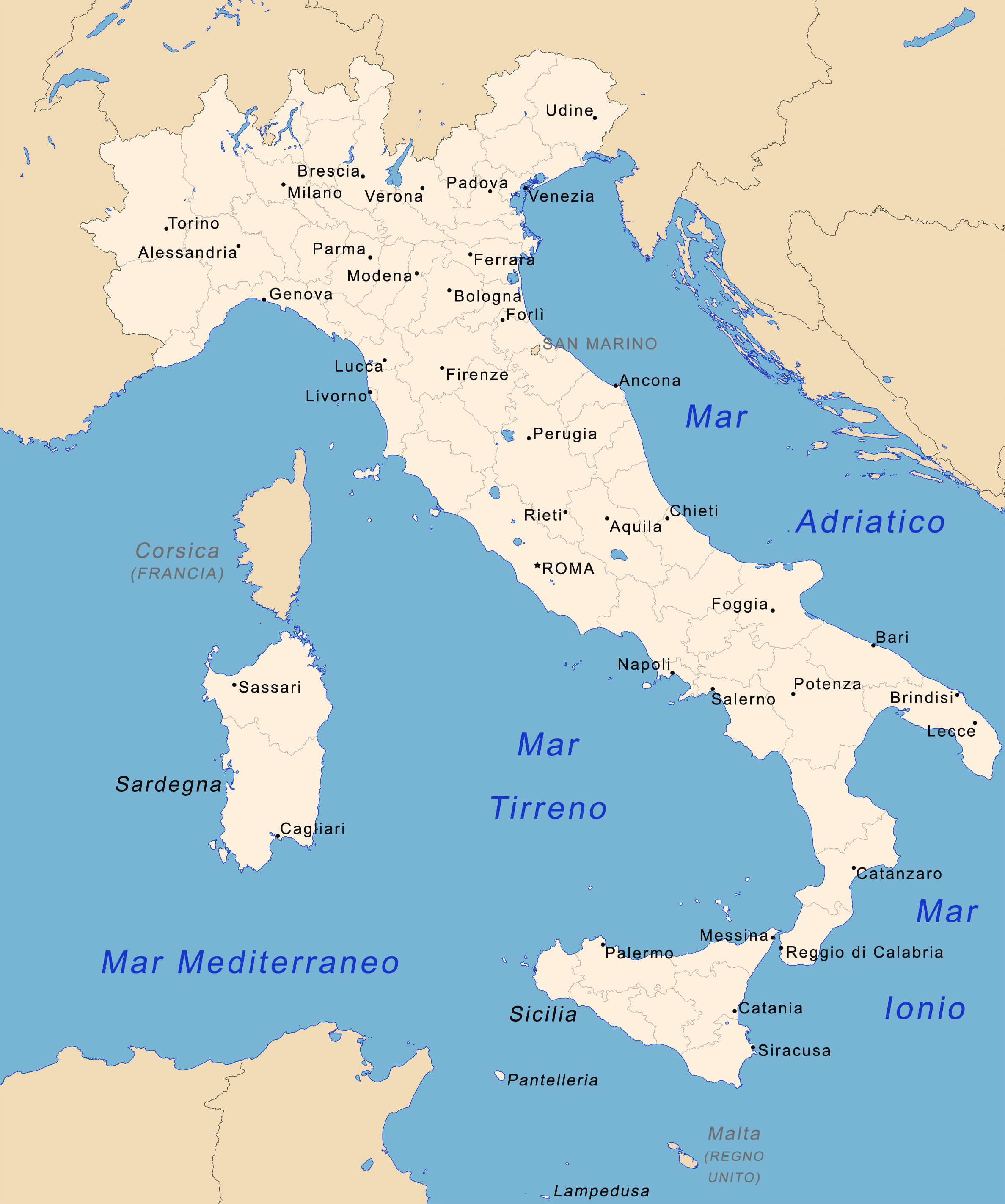
On the left, a map of the Kingdom of Italy before the First World War, on the right, a map of the Kingdom of Italy after the First World War.

In November 1918, after the surrender of Austria-Hungary, Italy occupied militarily Trentino Alto-Adige, the Julian March, Istria, the Kvarner Gulf and Dalmatia, all Austro-Hungarian territories. On the Dalmatian coast, Italy established the first Governorate of Dalmatia, which had the provisional aim of ferrying the territory towards full integration into the Kingdom of Italy, progressively importing national legislation in place of the previous one. The administrative capital was Zara. The Governorate of Dalmatia was evacuated following the Italo-Yugoslav agreements which resulted in the Treaty of Rapallo (1920). After the war, the Treaty of Rapallo between the Kingdom of Serbs, Croats and Slovenes (later the Kingdom of Yugoslavia) and the Kingdom of Italy (12 November 1920), Italy annexed Zadar in Dalmatia and some minor islands, almost all of Istria along with Trieste, excluding the island of Krk, and part of Kastav commune, which mostly went to the Kingdom of Serbs, Croats and Slovenes. By the Treaty of Rome (27 January 1924), the Free State of Fiume (Rijeka) was divided between Italy and Yugoslavia. Also, Italy occupied southern Albania and established a protectorate over Albania, which remained in place until 1920.

The Allies defeated the Austrian Empire in 1918 and Italy became one of the main winners of the war. At the Paris Peace Conference in 1919, Prime Minister Vittorio Emanuele Orlando focused almost exclusively on territorial gains, but he got far less than he wanted, and Italians were bitterly resentful when they were denied control of the city of Fiume. The conference, under the control of Britain, France and the United States refused to assign Dalmatia and Albania to Italy as had been promised in the Treaty of London. Britain, France and Japan divided the German overseas colonies into mandates of their own, excluding Italy. Italy also gained no territory from the breakup of the Ottoman Empire.

Italy did not receive other territories promised by the Treaty of London, so this outcome was denounced as a Mutilated victory. The rhetoric of Mutilated victory was adopted by Benito Mussolini and led to the rise of Italian fascism, becoming a key point in the propaganda of Fascist Italy. Historians regard Mutilated victory as a "political myth", used by fascists to fuel Italian imperialism and obscure the successes of liberal Italy in the aftermath of World War I. Italy also gained a permanent seat in the League of Nations's executive council.

=== Fascism and World War II ===
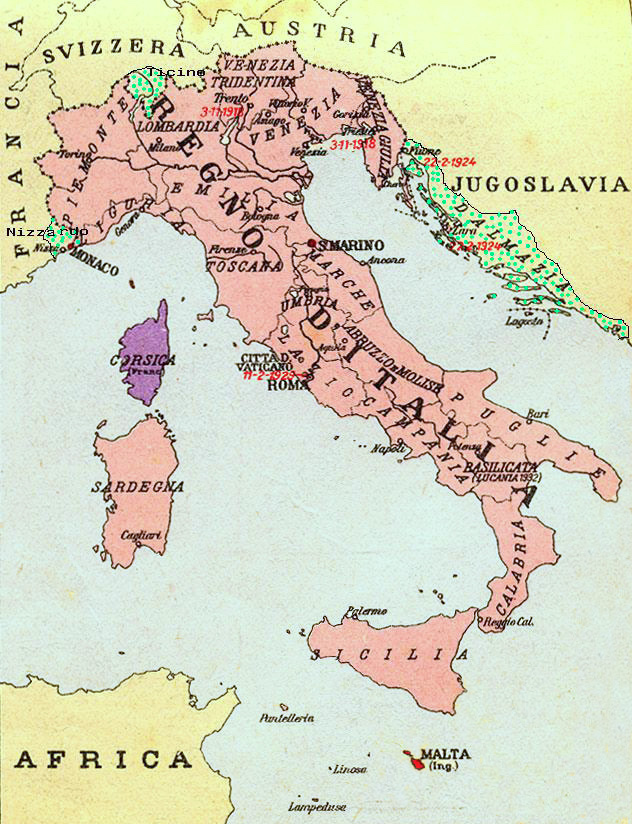
Italian ethnic regions claimed in the 1930s by Italian irredentists: * Green: Nice, Ticino and Dalmatia * Red: Malta * Violet: Corsica * Savoy and Corfu were later claimed.

The Fascist government that came to power with Benito Mussolini in 1922 sought to increase the size of the Italian empire and to satisfy the claims of Italian irredentists. Italian Fascism is based upon Italian nationalism and imperialism, and in particular seeks to complete what it considers as the incomplete project of the unification of Italy by incorporating Italia Irredenta (unredeemed Italy) into the state of Italy. To the east of Italy, the Fascists claimed that Dalmatia was a land of Italian culture whose Italians, including those of Italianized South Slavic descent, had been driven out of Dalmatia and into exile in Italy, and supported the return of Italians of Dalmatian heritage. Mussolini identified Dalmatia as having strong Italian cultural roots for centuries, similarly to Istria, via the Roman Empire and the Republic of Venice. To the south of Italy, the Fascists claimed Malta, which belonged to the United Kingdom, and Corfu, which instead belonged to Greece; to the north claimed Italian Switzerland, while to the west claimed Corsica, Nice, and Savoy, which belonged to France. The Fascist regime produced literature on Corsica that presented evidence of the island's italianità. The Fascist regime produced literature on Nice that justified that Nice was an Italian land based on historic, ethnic, and linguistic grounds.

Areas controlled by the Italian Empire during its existence Kingdom of Italy Colonies of Italy Protectorates and areas occupied during World War II

Mussolini promised to bring Italy back as a great power in Europe, building a "New Roman Empire" and holding power over the Mediterranean Sea. In propaganda, Fascists used the ancient Roman motto "Mare Nostrum" (Latin for "Our Sea") to describe the Mediterranean. For this reason the Fascist regime engaged in interventionist foreign policy. In 1923, the Greek island of Corfu was briefly occupied by Italy, after the assassination of General Tellini in Greek territory. In 1925, Italy forced Albania to become a de facto protectorate. In 1935, Mussolini invaded Ethiopia and founded Italian East Africa, resulting in an international alienation and leading to Italy's withdrawal from the League of Nations; Italy allied with Nazi Germany and the Empire of Japan and strongly supported Francisco Franco in the Spanish Civil War. In 1939, Italy formally annexed Albania. Italy entered World War II on 10 June 1940. The Italians initially advanced in British Somaliland, Egypt, the Balkans (establishing the Governorate of Dalmatia and Montenegro, the Province of Ljubljana, and the puppet states Independent State of Croatia and Hellenic State), and eastern fronts. They were, however, subsequently defeated on the Eastern Front as well as in the East African campaign and the North African campaign, losing as a result their territories in Africa and in the Balkans.

An Allied invasion of Sicily began in July 1943, leading to the collapse of the Fascist regime and the fall of Mussolini on 25 July. In the north, the Germans set up the Italian Social Republic (RSI), a Nazi puppet state with Mussolini installed as leader after he was rescued by German paratroopers. Some Italian troops in the south were organised into the Italian Co-belligerent Army, which fought alongside the Allies for the rest of the war, while other Italian troops, loyal to Mussolini and his RSI, continued to fight alongside the Germans in the National Republican Army. Also, the post-armistice period saw the rise of a large anti-fascist resistance movement, the Resistenza. As result, the country descended into civil war; the Italian resistance fought a guerrilla war against the Nazi German occupiers and Italian Fascist forces, while clashes between the Fascist RSI Army and the Royalist Italian Co-Belligerent Army were rare. In late April 1945, with total defeat looming, Mussolini attempted to escape north, but was captured and summarily executed near Lake Como by Italian partisans. His body was then taken to Milan, where it was hung upside down at a service station for public viewing and to provide confirmation of his demise. Hostilities ended on 29 April 1945, when the German forces in Italy surrendered.

=== Republican era ===
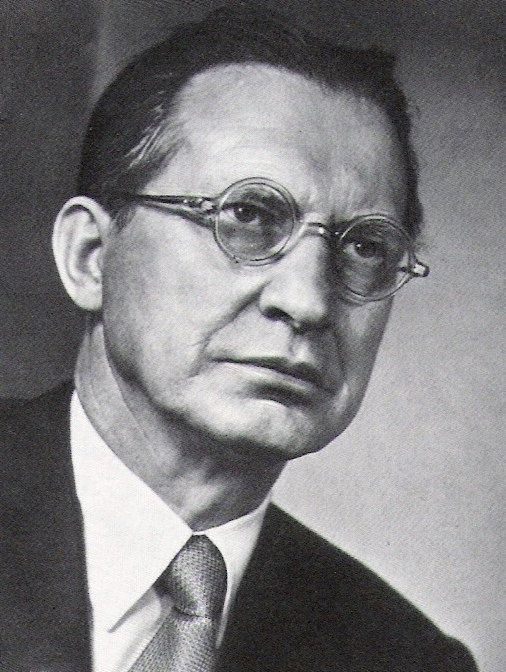
Alcide De Gasperi, first republican Prime Minister of Italy and one of the Founding Fathers of the European Union

Italy became a republic after the 1946 Italian institutional referendum held on 2 June 1946, a day celebrated since as Festa della Repubblica. This was the first time that Italian women voted at the national level, and the second time overall considering the local elections that were held a few months earlier in some cities. Under the Treaty of Peace with Italy, 1947, Istria, Kvarner, most of the Julian March as well as the Dalmatian city of Zara was annexed by Yugoslavia causing the Istrian-Dalmatian exodus, which led to the emigration of between 230,000 and 350,000 of local ethnic Italians (Istrian Italians and Dalmatian Italians), the others being ethnic Slovenians, ethnic Croatians, and ethnic Istro-Romanians, choosing to maintain Italian citizenship. Later, the Free Territory of Trieste was divided between the two states. Italy also lost all of its colonial possessions, formally ending the Italian Empire. In 1950, Italian Somaliland was made a United Nations Trust Territory under Italian administration until 1 July 1960. The Italian border that applies today has existed since 1975, when Trieste was formally re-annexed to Italy.

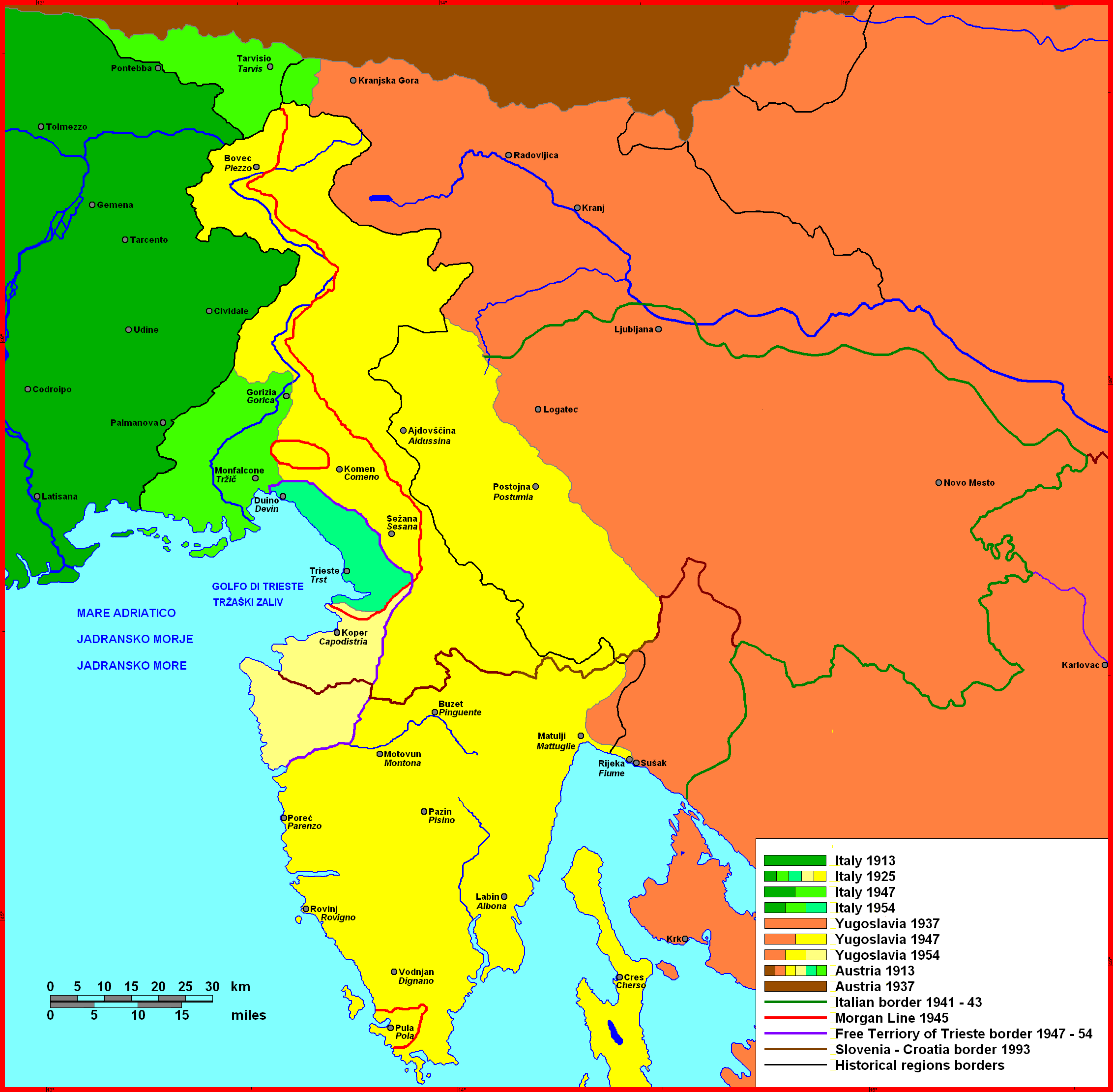
Changes to the Italian eastern border from 1920 to 1975. The Austrian Littoral, later renamed the Julian March, which was assigned to Italy in 1920 with the Treaty of Rapallo (with adjustments of its border in 1924 after the Treaty of Rome) and which was then ceded to Yugoslavia in 1947 with the Treaty of Paris Areas annexed to Italy in 1920 and remained Italian even after 1947 Areas annexed to Italy in 1920, passed to the Free Territory of Trieste in 1947 with the Paris treaties and definitively assigned to Italy in 1975 with the Treaty of Osimo Areas annexed to Italy in 1920, passed to the Free Territory of Trieste in 1947 with the Paris treaties and definitively assigned to Yugoslavia in 1975 with the Osimo treaty

In 1949 Italy became a member of NATO. The Marshall Plan helped to revive the Italian economy which, until the late 1960s, enjoyed a period of sustained economic growth commonly called the "Economic Miracle". In the 1950s, Italy became one of the six founding countries of the European Communities, following the 1952 establishment of the European Coal and Steel Community, and subsequent 1958 creations of the European Economic Community and European Atomic Energy Community. In 1993, the former two of these were incorporated into the European Union.

== Diplomatic relations ==
List of countries which Italy maintains diplomatic relations with:

#	Country	Date
1	Belgium	24 February 1851
2	Dominican Republic	22 March 1854
3	Argentina	5 May 1856
4	Spain	5 May 1856
5	Brazil	6 February 1857
6	United Kingdom	13 April 1859
7	Netherlands	15 September 1859
8	Portugal	24 October 1860
10	Switzerland	27 March 1861
9	United States	11 April 1861
11	Greece	12 May 1861
12	France	25 July 1861
13	Denmark	2 September 1861
14	Sweden	27 March 1862
15	Russia	2 July 1862
16	Uruguay	13 August 1862
17	Bolivia	25 February 1864
18	Chile	25 February 1864
19	Costa Rica	25 February 1864
20	El Salvador	25 February 1864
21	Guatemala	25 February 1864
22	Honduras	25 February 1864
—	Nicaragua (suspended)	25 February 1864
23	Peru	25 February 1864
24	Colombia	13 March 1864
25	Venezuela	13 March 1864
26	Mexico	28 December 1864
27	Japan	25 August 1866
28	Thailand	3 October 1868
29	Monaco	25 April 1875
30	Paraguay	19 July 1875
31	Serbia	18 January 1879
32	Bulgaria	25 July 1879
33	Romania	26 December 1879
34	Iran	18 February 1886
35	Luxembourg	7 February 1891
36	Ethiopia	24 June 1897
37	Haiti	24 February 1898
38	Ecuador	12 August 1900
39	Cuba	4 February 1903
40	Panama	15 January 1904
41	Norway	22 March 1906
42	Albania	21 February 1914
43	Czech Republic	24 October 1918
44	Poland	27 February 1919
45	Finland	6 September 1919
46	Austria	10 September 1919
47	Hungary	21 November 1920
48	Afghanistan	3 June 1921
49	Egypt	30 April 1922
50	Turkey	1 March 1924
51	Yemen	2 September 1926
—	Holy See	24 June 1929
52	South Africa	31 October 1929
53	Iraq	1931
54	Saudi Arabia	10 February 1932
55	Ireland	1 April 1937
56	Iceland	15 August 1945
57	Philippines	3 November 1946
58	Lebanon	20 November 1946
59	India	2 March 1947
60	Canada	13 August 1947
61	Syria	27 September 1947
62	Pakistan	7 April 1948
63	Israel	2 July 1949
64	Jordan	14 August 1949
65	Australia	24 November 1949
66	Indonesia	29 December 1949
67	Sri Lanka	18 April 1950
68	New Zealand	22 August 1950
69	Myanmar	24 November 1950
70	Cambodia	27 July 1951
71	Germany	4 September 1951
72	Liberia	5 October 1951
73	Libya	21 February 1952
—	Sovereign Military Order of Malta	12 June 1956
74	Tunisia	20 June 1956
75	Sudan	31 October 1956
76	Morocco	5 November 1956
77	South Korea	24 November 1956
78	Malaysia	31 August 1957
79	Nepal	31 August 1959
80	Guinea	5 December 1959
81	Somalia	1 July 1960
82	Democratic Republic of the Congo	21 July 1960
83	Ghana	8 November 1960
84	Senegal	1 March 1961
85	Ivory Coast	17 May 1961
86	Madagascar	30 May 1961
87	Cyprus	12 September 1961
88	Togo	14 September 1961
89	Niger	23 September 1961
90	Benin	30 November 1961
91	Tanzania	9 December 1961
92	Nigeria	1961
93	Cameroon	28 February 1962
94	Mali	27 April 1962
95	Burkina Faso	16 June 1962
96	Algeria	1 October 1962
97	Sierra Leone	1962
98	Gabon	6 February 1963
99	Jamaica	14 February 1963
100	Mauritania	25 February 1963
101	Trinidad and Tobago	4 January 1964
102	Chad	13 February 1964
103	Central African Republic	June 1964
104	Uganda	5 July 1964
105	Kenya	7 July 1964
106	Malta	21 September 1964
107	Kuwait	8 November 1964
108	Republic of the Congo	20 April 1965
109	Rwanda	5 May 1965
110	Singapore	28 October 1965
111	Gambia	30 October 1965
112	Laos	7 December 1965
113	Zambia	10 May 1966
114	Malawi	20 September 1966
115	Maldives	1966
116	Guyana	12 April 1967
117	Lesotho	June 1967
118	Burundi	1967
119	Eswatini	April 1969
120	Mauritius	8 April 1970
121	Mongolia	29 June 1970
122	China	6 November 1970
123	Botswana	1970
124	San Marino	1970
125	United Arab Emirates	1971
126	Oman	26 January 1972
127	Fiji	13 October 1972
128	Bangladesh	18 January 1973
129	Qatar	15 February 1973
130	Vietnam	23 March 1973
131	Bahrain	16 December 1973
132	Mozambique	25 June 1975
133	Angola	4 June 1976
134	Seychelles	29 June 1976
135	Comoros	1 November 1976
136	Cape Verde	18 November 1976
137	Grenada	19 January 1977
138	Barbados	23 August 1977
139	Djibouti	24 November 1977
140	Suriname	7 July 1978
141	Bahamas	1978
142	Papua New Guinea	30 April 1979
143	Tuvalu	July 1979
144	Saint Lucia	1979
145	Zimbabwe	18 April 1980
146	Tonga	26 November 1981
147	Vanuatu	23 March 1982
148	Belize	1 October 1982
149	Saint Vincent and the Grenadines	30 October 1982
150	Guinea-Bissau	15 December 1982
151	Equatorial Guinea	8 March 1985
152	Dominica	23 March 1985
153	Brunei	15 April 1985
154	Antigua and Barbuda	20 August 1985
155	Solomon Islands	1 March 1987
156	Samoa	25 May 1987
157	São Tomé and Príncipe	24 December 1988
158	Namibia	12 April 1990
159	Latvia	30 August 1991
160	Lithuania	30 August 1991
161	Estonia	31 August 1991
162	Croatia	17 January 1992
163	Slovenia	17 January 1992
164	Moldova	21 February 1992
165	Ukraine	29 January 1992
166	Liechtenstein	6 February 1992
167	Armenia	17 March 1992
168	Kyrgyzstan	24 March 1992
169	Uzbekistan	24 March 1992
170	Belarus	13 April 1992
171	Azerbaijan	8 May 1992
172	Georgia	11 May 1992
173	Tajikistan	19 May 1992
174	Turkmenistan	9 June 1992
175	Kazakhstan	21 August 1992
176	Federated States of Micronesia	27 November 1992
177	Slovakia	1 January 1993
178	Bosnia and Herzegovina	1 February 1993
179	Eritrea	24 May 1993
180	Marshall Islands	24 September 1993
181	North Macedonia	16 December 1993
182	Andorra	1 February 1995
183	Kiribati	7 December 1995
184	Saint Kitts and Nevis	7 January 1996
185	Nauru	27 February 1997
186	North Korea	4 January 2000
187	Palau	22 March 2002
188	Timor-Leste	2002
—	Cook Islands	9 October 2003
189	Montenegro	14 June 2006
—	Kosovo	15 May 2008
190	South Sudan	23 May 2012
—	Niue	12 September 2015

== Bilateral relations by country ==
=== Africa ===
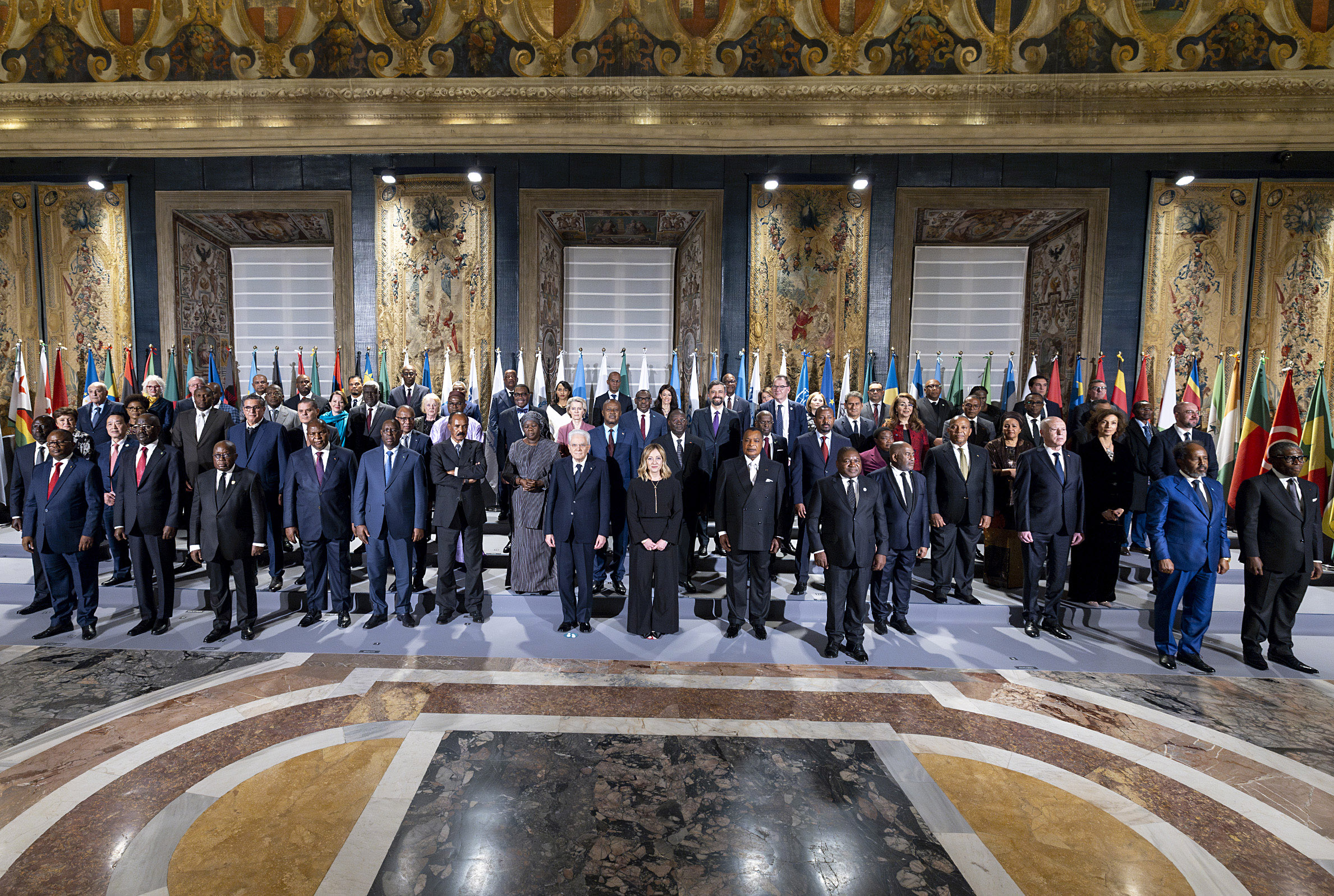
Group photo at the 2024 Italy–Africa Summit

Country	Beginning of formal relations	Notes
Algeria	1 October 1962	See Algeria–Italy relations Both countries established diplomatic relations on 1 October 1962.: Relations date from the period of the Roman Empire.; Algeria has an embassy in Rome.; Italy has an embassy in Algiers.; There are over 100,675 Algerians in Italy (see Algerians in Italy).
Angola	4 June 1976	See Angola–Italy relations: Angola has an embassy in Rome.; Italy has an embassy in Luanda.
Burkina Faso	16 June 1962	Both countries established diplomatic relations on 16 June 1962 when Mr. Renzo Luigi Romanelli, the first Italian Ambassador to Upper Volta, has presented his letters of credence to President Maurice Yameogo.: Burkina Faso has an embassy in Rome and honorary consulates in Florence, Milan, Naples, and Palermo.; Italy has an honorary consulate in Ouagadougou.
Comoros	1 November 1976	Both countries established diplomatic relations on 1 November 1976: Comoros is represented in Italy by its embassy in Paris, France and an honorary consulate in Roma.; Italy is represented in Comoros by its embassy in Dar es Salaam, Tanzania and an honorary consulate in Anjouan.
Democratic Republic of the Congo	21 July 1960	Both countries established diplomatic relations on 21 July 1960 when accredited first Ambassador of Italy to Congo (Leopoldville) Mr. Pietro Franca: In March 2021, Italian Ambassador, Luca Attanasio, was killed while traveling to a World Food Programme-run school feeding program.
Egypt	30 April 1922	See Egypt–Italy relations Both countries established diplomatic relations on 30 April 1922 when has been appointed first Envoy Extraordinary and Minister Plenipotentiary of Italy to Egypt Mr Lazzaro Negrotto Cambiaso. Relations between both countries were established during the period of the Roman Empire. However, in World War II, relations were strained as Italy invaded Egypt. However, after the war, relations were re-established and are close. Egypt has representations in Rome and Milan, while Italy has representations in Cairo and Alexandria, also the two nations are members of the Union for the Mediterranean. Relations deteriorated after the abduction and killing of Italian student Giulio Regeni. Egypt has been accused by Italian authorities and public opinion of lacking of transparence.: There are around 3,374 people of Italian descent living in Egypt (see Italian Egyptians).
Eritrea	24 May 1993	See Eritrea–Italy relations Both countries established diplomatic relations on 24 May 1993.: Eritrea was an Italian colony from 1882 until 1941.; Eritrea has an embassy in Rome.; Italy has an embassy in Asmara.; There are around 100,000 people of Italian descent living in Eritrea (see Italian Eritreans).
Ethiopia	24 June 1897	See Ethiopia–Italy relations Both countries established diplomatic relations on 24 June 1897.: Ethiopia was occupied by Italy from 1936 to 1941.; Ethiopia has an embassy in Rome.; Italy has an embassy in Addis Ababa.; There are around 3,400 people of Italian descent living in Ethiopia (see Italians of Ethiopia).
Kenya	1963	See Italy–Kenya relations: Relations were formally established after Kenya gained its independence from British rule.; Italy has an embassy in Nairobi and 2 counsulates in Malindi and Mombasa.; Kenya has an embassy in Rome.
Libya	21 February 1952	See Italy–Libya relations Both countries established diplomatic relations on 21 February 1952 when has been accredited first Envoy Extraordinary and Minister Plenipotentiary of Italy to Libya Mr. Mario Conti.: Between 1911 and 1947, Libya was an Italian colony.; Italy has an embassy in Tripoli.; Libya has an embassy in Rome and 2 general consulates (in Milan and Palermo).; See also History of Libya as Italian Colony, Italy–Libya relations
Mauritania	25 February 1963	Both countries established diplomatic relations on 25 February 1963 when first Ambassador of Mauritania to Italy (resident in Paris) Mr. Bakar Ould Ahmedou presented his credentials to President Antonio Segni.: Italy is represented in Mauritania by its embassy in Rabat, Morocco.; Mauritania has an embassy in Roma.
Morocco	1 October 1956	See Italy–Morocco relations Both countries established diplomatic relations on 1 October 1956: Italy has an embassy in Rabat.; Morocco has an embassy in Rome and consulate-generals in Bologna, Milan, Naples, Palermo, Turin and Verona.
Nigeria		Italy has an embassy in Nigeria and a consulate in Lagos.; Nigeria has an embassy in Rome.
Rwanda	5 May 1965	Both countries established diplomatic relations on 5 May 1965 when Ambassador of Rwanda to Italy Mr. Emanuele Kaberuka presented his credentials to President Giuseppe Saragat.
Senegal	1 March 1961	Both countries established diplomatic relations on 1 March 1961.
Somalia	1 July 1960	See Italy–Somalia relations Both countries established diplomatic relations on 1 July 1960.: Relations date from the period of the Roman Empire.; Somalia was an Italian colony from 1889 until 1947.; Italy recognizes and supports the Federal Government of Somalia.; Somalia has an embassy in Rome.; Italy is scheduled to re-open its embassy in Mogadishu.; There are around 1,000 people of Italian descent living in Somalia (see Italian Somalis).
South Africa	31 October 1929	See Italy–South Africa relations Both countries established diplomatic relations on 31 October 1929 when has been appointed first Envoy Extraordinary and Minister Plenipotentiary of Italy to Union of South Africa Natale Labia.: Italy has an embassy in Pretoria, a consulate in Johannesburg, 2 consulates (in Cape Town and Durban) and 2 honorary consulates (in East London and Port Elizabeth).; South Africa has an embassy in Rome and 7 honorary consulates (in Bari, Bologna, Florence, Genoa, Naples, Trieste and Venice).; There are around 77,400 people of Italian descent living in South Africa (see Italian South Africans).; South African Ministry of Foreign Affairs about relations with Italy
South Sudan	23 May 2012	Both countries established diplomatic relations on 23 May 2012.
Sudan	31 October 1956	Both countries established diplomatic relations on 31 October 1956 when Envoy Extraordinary and Minister Plenipotentiary of Sudan to Italy Mr. Omer Abedel Hanid Adeel has presented his credentials to President Giovanni Gronchi.
Tanzania	9 December 1961	Both countries established diplomatic relations on 9 December 1961 when open Embassy of Italy in Dar es Salaam with accredited Chargé d'Affaires of Italy to Tanganyika Mr. Luciano Falco
Tunisia	20 June 1956	See Italy–Tunisia relations Both countries established diplomatic relations on 20 June 1956.: Italy has an embassy in Tunis and 3 honorary consulates (in Bizerte, Sfax and Sousse).; Tunisia has an embassy in Rome, a general consulate in Palermo, 3 consulates (in Genoa, Milan and Naples) and 2 honorary consulates (in Bari and Novara).; Both countries are full members of the Union for the Mediterranean.; There was an important Italian community living in Tunisia before the independence.; Italy briefly occupied Tunisia from 1942 to 1943.
Uganda	5 July 1964	Both countries established diplomatic relations on 5 July 1964
Zimbabwe	18 April 1980	Both countries established diplomatic relations on 18 April 1980.

=== Americas ===
Country	Beginning of formal relations	Notes
Argentina	5 May 1856	See Argentina–Italy relations Both countries established diplomatic relations on 5 May 1856 when has been accredited first Chargé d'Affaires of Italy to Argentina Marcello Cerruti.: Argentina has an embassy in Rome and a consulate-general in Milan.; Italy has an embassy in Buenos Aires and consulates-general in Bahía Blanca, Córdoba, La Plata and Rosario and consulates in Mar del Plata and Mendoza.; There are around 25,000,000 people of Italian descent living in Argentina (see Italian Argentines)
Belize	1 October 1982	Both countries have established diplomatic relations on 1 October 1982.; Belize has a consulate-general in Milan.; Italy is represented in Belize through its embassy in Mexico City and an honorary consulate.
Bolivia	25 February 1864	Both countries established diplomatic relations on 25 February 1864 when has been appointed first Minister Resident of Italy to Bolivia Antonio Maria Migliorati.: Bolivia has an embassy in Rome and a consulate-general in Milan.; Italy has an embassy in La Paz.; There are around 15,000 people of Italian descent living in Bolivia (see Italian Bolivians)
Brazil	6 November 1859	See Brazil–Italy relations Both countries established diplomatic relations on 6 November 1859 when has been appointed first Chargé d'Affaires of Italy to Brazil Gabriele Galateri di Genola.: Brazil has an embassy in Rome, a consulate-general in Milan, and honorary consulates in Bari, Catanzaro, Florence, Naples, Palermo, Genoa, Trieste, Turin and Venice.; Italy has an embassy in Brasília, consulates-general in Curitiba, Porto Alegre, Rio de Janeiro, São Paulo, and consulates in Belo Horizonte and in Recife.; There are around 32,000,000 people of Italian descent living in Brazil (see Italian Brazilians)
Canada	13 August 1947	See Canada–Italy relations Both countries established diplomatic relations on 13 August 1947 when has been established Legation of Canada in Italy.: Canada has an embassy in Rome, and 2 consulates (in Milan and Udine).; Italy has an embassy in Ottawa, 3 consulates-general (in Montreal, Toronto and Vancouver).; Both countries are full members of the Organisation for Economic Co-operation and Development, the G8, and NATO.; There are around 1,587,970 people of Italian descent living in Canada (see Italian Canadians).; Canadian Ministry of Foreign Affairs and International Trade about the relation with Italy
Chile	25 February 1864	See Chile–Italy relations Both countries established diplomatic relations on 25 February 1864 when has been appointed first Minister Resident of Italy to Chile Antonio Maria Migliorati.: Chile has an embassy in Rome and a consulate-general in Milan.; Italy has an embassy in Santiago.; There are around 600,000 people of Italian descent living in Chile (see Italian Chileans)
Colombia	13 March 1864	See Colombia–Italy relations Both countries established diplomatic relations on 25 February 1864 when has been appointed first Minister Resident of Italy to Colombia Antonio Maria Migliorati.: Colombia has an embassy in Rome and a consulate-general in Milan.; Italy has an embassy, with a military attaché, in Bogotá and three honorary consulates in Barranquilla, Cali, and Cartagena.; There are around 2,000,000 people of Italian descent living in Colombia (see Italian Colombian)
Costa Rica	25 February 1864	Both countries established diplomatic relations on 25 February 1864 when has been appointed first Minister Resident of Italy to Ecuador Antonio Maria Migliorati.: Costa Rica has an embassy in Rome.; Italy has an embassy in San José, Costa Rica.; There are around 30,000 people of Italian descent living in Costa Rica (see Italian Costa Ricans)
Cuba	4 February 1903	Both countries established diplomatic relations on 4 February 1903.: Cuba has an embassy in Rome.; Italy has an embassy in Havana.; There are around 20,000 people of Italian descent living in Cuba (see Italian Cubans)
Dominican Republic	24 February 1898	See Dominican Republic-Italy relations Both countries established diplomatic relations on 24 February 1898 when has been accredited Minister Resident of Italy to Dominican Republic Chicco Enrico.: Dominican Republic has an embassy in Rome.; Italy has an embassy in Santo Domingo.; There are around 300,000 people of Italian descent living in the Dominican Republic (see Italian Dominicans)
Ecuador	25 February 1864	Both countries established diplomatic relations on 25 February 1864 when has been appointed first Minister Resident of Italy to Ecuador Antonio Maria Migliorati.
El Salvador	25 February 1864	Both countries established diplomatic relations on 25 February 1864 when has been appointed first Minister Resident of Italy to El Salvador Antonio Maria Migliorati.: El Salvador has an embassy in Rome and a consulate-general in Milan.; Italy has an embassy in San Salvador.; There are around 200,000 people of Italian descent living in El Salvador (see Italian Salvadorans)
Grenada		Italy is accredited to Grenada from its embassy in Caracas, Venezuela.; Grenada has an honorary consulate in Florence.
Guatemala	25 February 1864	Both countries established diplomatic relations on 25 February 1864 when has been appointed first Minister Resident of Italy to Guatemala Antonio Maria Migliorati.
Haiti	24 February 1898	Both countries established diplomatic relations on 24 February 1898 when has been accredited Minister Resident of Italy to Haiti Chicco Enrico.
Honduras	25 February 1864	Both countries established diplomatic relations on 25 February 1864 when has been appointed first Minister Resident of Italy to Honduras Antonio Maria Migliorati.
Jamaica	14 February 1963	Both countries established diplomatic relations on 14 February 1963.
Mexico	28 December 1864	See Italy–Mexico relations Both countries established diplomatic relations on 28 December 1864 when has been appointed first Minister Resident of Italy to Mexico Vittorio Sallier de la Tour.: Relations were established in 1874 after the unification of Italy. Diplomatic relations were severed during World War II when Mexico declared war on the axis powers. Relations were re-established in 1946.; Mexico has an embassy in Rome and a consulate-general in Milan.; Italy has an embassy in Mexico City.; Both countries are members of the G-20 and the Organisation for Economic Co-operation and Development.; There are around 85,000 people of Italian descent living in Mexico (see Italian immigration to Mexico)
Nicaragua	25 February 1864	Both countries established diplomatic relations on 25 February 1864 when has been appointed first Minister Resident of Italy to Nicaragua Antonio Maria Migliorati. Diplomatic relations were suspended in July 2026.
Panama	15 January 1904	Both countries established diplomatic relations on 15 January 1904
Paraguay	21 July 1867	Both countries established diplomatic relations on 21 July 1867 when has been appointed first Chargé d'Affaires of Italy to Paraguay Luigi Joannini Ceva di San Michele.: Italy has an embassy in Asunción.; Paraguay has an embassy in Rome.; There are around 600,000 people of Italian descent living in Paraguay (see Italians in Paraguay)
Peru	25 February 1864	Both countries established diplomatic relations on 25 February 1864 when has been appointed first Minister Resident of Italy to Peru Giovanni Antonio Migliorati. Main article: Italy–Peru relations: Italy and Peru have a long and very rich history of cultural and political connections.; Italy has an embassy in Lima.; Peru has an embassy in Rome and consulates-general in Florence, Genoa, Milan and Turin.; There are between 500,000 and 900,000 people of Italian descent living in Peru (see Italian Peruvians).
Trinidad and Tobago	4 January 1964	Both countries established diplomatic relations on 4 January 1964.
United States	11 April 1861	See Italy–United States relations Both countries established diplomatic relations on 11 April 1861. The United States enjoys a peculiar and friendly relation with Italy, as the latter, defeated in WWII, has been a secret battlefield of the Cold War. Italy and the US are NATO allies and cooperate in the United Nations, in various regional organizations, and bilaterally. Italy has worked closely with the United States and with other nations on such issues as NATO and UN operations as well as with assistance to Russia and the New Independent States; the Middle East peace process; multilateral talks. Under longstanding bilateral agreements flowing from NATO membership, Italy hosts important U.S. military forces at Vicenza and Pisa (army); Aviano (air force); and Sigonella, Gaeta, and Naples- home port for the U.S. Navy Sixth Fleet. The United States still has about 16,000 military personnel stationed in Italy. The NATO War College is situated at Cecchignola, a neighborhood of Rome.: There are around 17,063,646 people of Italian descent living in United States (see Italian Americans)
Uruguay	5 May 1856	See Italy–Uruguay relations Both countries established diplomatic relations on 5 May 1856 when has been appointed first Chargé d'Affaires of Italy to Uruguay Marcello Cerruti.: Italy has an embassy in Montevideo and 4 honorary consulates (in Colonia, Maldonado, Melo and Paysandú).; Uruguay has an embassy in Rome, a general consulate in Milan and 4 honorary consulates (in Bologna, Genoa, Livorno and Padua).; There are around 1,500,000 people of Italian descent living in Uruguay (see Italian Uruguayans).
Venezuela	13 March 1864	See Italy–Venezuela relations Both countries established diplomatic relations on 13 March 1864 when has been appointed first Minister Resident of Italy to Venezuela Antonio Maria Migliorati.: Italy has an embassy in Caracas and a consulate in Maracaibo.; Venezuela has an embassy in Rome and consulates-general in Milan and Naples.; There are around 5,000,000 people of Italian descent living in Venezuela (see Italian Venezuelans)

=== Asia ===
Country	Beginning of formal relations	Notes
Afghanistan	3 June 1921	See Afghanistan–Italy relations Both countries established diplomatic relations on 3 June 1921.: Afghanistan has an embassy in Rome, which was established as a legation in 1921, and was upgraded to embassy in 1960. Italy has an embassy in Kabul.; Italy was among the first nations to recognise Afghanistan's sovereignty, following the 1919 recognition by the Soviet Union.; Following Germany's 1935 closening with Afghanistan, Italy also established close relations. Afghanistan resisted calls from Moscow and London to expel the Italian and German diplomatic corps for most of World War II.; Italy has served as a place of exile for two former Afghan kings, Amanullah Khan (deposed 1929) and Mohammed Zahir Shah (deposed 1973).
Armenia	17 March 1992	See Armenia–Italy relations Both countries established diplomatic relations on 17 March 1992.: Armenia has an embassy in Rome.; Italy has an embassy in Yerevan and an honorary consulate in Gyumri.; Italy has recognized the Armenian genocide in 2000.; There are around 2,500 people of Armenian descent living in Italy (see Armenians in Italy).; Both countries are full members of the Council of Europe.
Azerbaijan	8 May 1992	See Azerbaijan–Italy relations Both countries established diplomatic relations on 8 May 1992.: Azerbaijan has an embassy in Rome.; Italy has an embassy in Baku.; Both countries are full members of the Council of Europe.
Bahrain	16 December 1973	Both countries established diplomatic relations on 16 December 1973.
Bangladesh	18 January 1973	Both countries established diplomatic relations on 18 January 1973 when first Ambassador of Bangladesh to Italy Mr.Ikbal Athar presented his credentials to President Giovanni Leone. Bangladesh is a huge import market for Italy. Italy has an embassy in Dhaka. Bangladesh has an embassy in Rome.
China	6 November 1970	See People's Republic of China – Italy relations Both countries established diplomatic relations on 6 November 1970. In 2005, Italy and the People's Republic of China have celebrated the 35th anniversary of the establishment of diplomatic relations between the two nations. However, China's massive exports of textile and footwear into Italy are said to be a rising concern to Italy's economy and productivity.
Georgia	11 May 1992	See Georgia–Italy relations Both countries established diplomatic relations on 11 May 1992.: Georgia has an embassy in Rome.; Italy has an embassy in Tbilisi.; Both countries are full members of the Council of Europe.; Georgia is an EU candidate and Italy is an EU member.; Georgian Ministry of Foreign Affairs about the relation with Italy
India	25 March 1948	See India–Italy relations Both countries established diplomatic relations on 25 March 1948.: India has an embassy in Rome. and a consulate-general in Milan; Italy has an embassy in New Delhi. and a consulate-general in Mumbai and Kolkata; In 2012, relations deteriorated following the Enrica Lexie Case: There are around 15,000-20,000 people of Italian descent living in India (see Italians in India).
Indonesia	25 June 1950	See Indonesia–Italy relations Both countries established diplomatic relations on 25 June 1950.: Both nations have shown strong desire to improve their relations, especially in intercultural understanding and trade.; Indonesia recognizes Italy's strategic location and important role in the middle of Mediterranean region, while Italy has favoured relations with Indonesia, and sees Indonesia as the leader in Southeast Asia.; The relations between two countries not only important to bridge the two regional communities; European Union and ASEAN, but also vital as intercultural and interfaith dialog.; Indonesia has an embassy in Rome, that also accredited to Malta, Cyprus, San Marino, while Italy has an embassy in Jakarta.
Iran	18 February 1886	See Iran–Italy relations Both countries established diplomatic relations on 18 February 1886 when has been appointed first Chargé d'Affaires of Italy to Persia Alessandro De Rege Di Donato. In 2005, Italy was the third largest trading partner of Iran with 7.5% of all exports to Iran. Italy was the top trading partner of Iran in the European Union in early 2006. Commercial exchanges hit 6 billion euros in 2008.
Iraq		See Iraq–Italy relations Iraq has an embassy in Rome and Italy has an embassy in Baghdad and a consulate-general in Basra.
Israel	13 July 1949	See Israel–Italy relations Both countries established diplomatic relations on 13 July 1949 when has been accredited first Envoy Extraordinary and Minister Plenipotentiary of Israel to Italy Mr. Shlomo Ginossar.: Italy has an embassy in Tel Aviv, two general consulates in West Jerusalem and East Jerusalem and 4 honorary consulates (in Beersheba, Eilat, Haifa and Nazareth).; Israel has an embassy in Rome.; Both countries are full members of the Union for the Mediterranean.; See also Italian Jews
Japan	25 August 1866	See Italy–Japan relations Both countries established diplomatic relations on 25 August 1866.: Both countries allied with Germany during World War II (though the Kingdom of Italy left the alliance in 1943, the German-controlled Italian Social Republic joined it the same year), and also allied during the Cold War with the United States.; Italy has an embassy in Tokyo, a general consulate in Osaka and 3 honorary consulates (in Hiroshima, Nagoya and Okinawa).; Japan has an embassy in Rome, a general consulate in Milan.; Japanese Ministry of Foreign Affairs about relations with Italy
Jordan	7 March 1950	Both countries established diplomatic relations on 7 March 1950 when has been accredited first Chargé d'Affaires of Jordan to Italy Mr. Edmond Roch Bey.
Kazakhstan	21 August 1992	See Italy-Kazakhstan relations Both countries established diplomatic relations on 21 August 1992.: In 2017, the trade between Kazakhstan and Italy amounted to $9.6 billion, which is an increase of 13.5% compared to 2016.; Italy has an embassy in Astana.; Kazakhstan has an embassy in Rome.
Kyrgyzstan	24 March 1992	Both countries established diplomatic relations on 24 March 1992.
Lebanon	20 November 1946	See Italy–Lebanon relations Both countries established diplomatic relations on 20 November 1946 when has been accredited first Chargé d'Affaires of Italy to Lebanon Mr. Adolfo Alessandrini.: Both countries are members of the Union for the Mediterranean.; Lebanon opened a legation in 1946, which was transformed into an embassy in 1955.; Both countries signed a Treaty of Friendship, Cooperation and Navigation in 1949.; Italy supported the reconstruction of Lebanon after the Taef Agreement.; There are around 4,400 people of Italian descent living in Lebanon (Italians in Lebanon).
Maldives	1966	Both countries established diplomatic relations in 1966.: Italy has an embassy in Colombo which also functed as non-resident ambassador to Maldives.; Maldives is represented in Italy through its permanent mission to UN in Geneva since 2012.
Malaysia	31 August 1957	See Italy–Malaysia relations Both countries established diplomatic relations on 31 August 1957.: Italy has an embassy in Kuala Lumpur.; Malaysia has an embassy in Rome.
Myanmar	24 November 1950	Both countries established diplomatic relations on 24 November 1950.
Nepal	31 August 1959	Both countries established diplomatic relations on 31 August 1959.
North Korea	4 January 2000	See Italy–North Korea relations
Oman	26 January 1972	Both countries established diplomatic relations on 26 January 1972
Pakistan	7 April 1948	Both countries established diplomatic relations on 7 April 1948.: Pakistan and Italy enjoy close relationship in all fields. Both countries formally have friendly foreign relations. There are over 100,000 Pakistanis living in Italy, mainly living in Milan and Brescia.; Pakistan has an embassy in Rome and a consulate-general in Milan for representation; Italy maintains an embassy in Islamabad, a consulate-general in Karachi and an honorary consulate in Lahore.
Philippines	3 November 1946	See Italy–Philippines relations Both countries established diplomatic relations on 3 November 1946 when has been accredited first interim Chargé d'Affaires of Italy to Philippines Mr. Vittorio Strigari.: A Treaty of Friendship which was signed in Rome and ratified in December 1948. Italy has an embassy in Manila and the Philippines has an embassy in Rome.
Qatar	15 February 1973	See Italy–Qatar relations Both countries established diplomatic relations on 15 February 1973: Qatar has an embassy in Rome.; Italy has an embassy in Doha.
Saudi Arabia	10 February 1932	See Italy–Saudi Arabia relations Both countries established diplomatic relations on 10 February 1932.: Italy has an embassy in Riyadh and general consulate in Jeddah.; Saudi Arabia has an embassy in Rome.
Singapore	28 October 1965	Both countries established diplomatic relations on 28 October 1965.
South Korea	24 November 1956	See Italy–South Korea relations The establishment of diplomatic relations between the kingdom of Italy and the kingdom of Korea began on 26 June 1884, and the re-establishment of diplomatic relations between the Italian republic and the Republic of Korea was on November 24, 1956.: Italy has a Working Holiday Program Agreement with South Korea.; During the Korean War Italy sent medical staff to help the South Korea.; Italian embassy in Seoul.; South Korean embassy in Rome.; Bilateral Trade in 2014; Exports 3,473,000,000 US dollars; Imports 6,260,000,000 US dollars; Bilateral Investments in 2014; South Korea's Investment in Italy 654,000,000 US; Italy's Investment in South Korea US$539,000,000; The number of the South Koreans living in Italy in 2012 was about 4,054.; The Italian Prime Minister Mario Monti visited Seoul in March 2012. (To attend the Seoul Nuclear Security Summit); The President of the Republic of Korea Park Geun-hye visited Rome in October 2014.; From 20 to 24 November 2011, 54 participating Italian companies, 8 trade associations and chambers of commerce and 7 banks, held over 300 meetings with 139 Korean companies. The events were promoted by Confindustria (the Italian employers' federation), the Italian Banking Association (ABI), the Ministry for Economic Development (MiSE) and the Ministry for Foreign Affairs (MFA). It took the form of seminars, workshops, B2B meetings and institutional events, as well as visits to representations of Korean industry. This was the first structured initiative, with a broad-ranging business representation in Korea, by the Italian economic system since the EU-Korea Free Trade Agreement (FTA) entered into force.
Sri Lanka	18 April 1950	Both countries established diplomatic relations on 18 April 1950. Italy and Sri Lanka maintain a strong relationship dated back from 1st century.: Italy aided Sri Lanka with almost 50 million Euros when a tsunami struck Sri Lanka in 2004.; Italy has an embassy in Colombo.; Sri Lanka has an embassy in Rome.; The estimated trade value between these countries were US$604.49 million in 2009.
Tajikistan	19 May 1992	Both countries established diplomatic relations on 19 May 1992.
Thailand	3 October 1868	Both countries established diplomatic relations on 3 October 1868.: Italy has an embassy in Bangkok and two honorary consulates (in Chiang Mai and Phuket).; Thailand has an embassy in Rome.
Timor Leste	2002	Both countries established diplomatic relations in 2002.
Turkey	25 September 1856	See Italy–Turkey relations Both countries established diplomatic relations on 25 September 1856 when has been appointed first Envoy Extraordinary and Minister Plenipotentiary of Italy to Turkey Giacomo Durando.: Italy has an embassy in Ankara, a general consulate in Istanbul, a consulate İzmir and 3 honorary consulates in Bursa, Antalya and İskenderun.; Turkey has an embassy in Rome and a general consulate in Milan.; Both countries are full members of NATO and the Union for the Mediterranean.; Italy is an EU member and Turkey is an EU candidate.; In 2006, Turkey and Italy celebrated the 150th anniversary of the initiation of diplomatic relations.; Turkey is a prime destination for Italian tourists; Turkish Ministry of Foreign Affairs about relations with Italy
Turkmenistan	9 June 1992	Both countries established diplomatic relations on 9 June 1992.
United Arab Emirates		See Italy–United Arab Emirates relations: Italy has an embassy in Abu Dhabi and general consulate in Dubai.; United Arab Emirates has an embassy in Rome.; There are around 10,000 people of Italian descent living in United Arab Emirates (Italians in the United Arab Emirates).
Uzbekistan	24 March 1992	Both countries established diplomatic relations on 24 March 1992.
Vietnam	23 March 1973	See Italy–Vietnam relations Both countries established diplomatic relations on 23 March 1973.: Italy has an embassy in Hanoi and a general consulate in Ho Chi Minh City.; Vietnam has an embassy in Rome.

=== Europe ===
Country	Beginning of formal relations	Notes
Albania	21 February 1914	See Albania–Italy relations Both countries established diplomatic relations on 21 February 1914 when has been appointed first Envoy Extraordinary and Minister Plenipotentiary of Italy to Albania Carlo Aliotti. The Kingdom of Italy supported Albanian Declaration of Independence in 1912. Arbëreshë people Italian expeditionary corps in Albania; Treaties of Tirana; Italian invasion of Albania; Albanian Kingdom (1939–1943); Italian colonists in Albania: Albania has an embassy in Rome and a consulate general in Bari and Milan.; Italy has an embassy in Tirana and consulates in Gjirokastër, Shkodra, Vlora.; Italy and Albania share similar historical, political and cultural backgrounds.; Albania is home to 20,000 Italian migrants and has a 5,000 Italian indigenous community.; Italy is home to indigenous Arbereshe community, including up to 900,000 Albanian immigrants.; Italian is the third most spoken language of Albania, after Albanian and Greek.; Italy is considered one of Albania's strongest allies especially within the European Union.; Albanian is a prominent language in Italy with Albanian immigrants speaking Albanian in large numbers on top of the over 800,000 Italians who speak the Arbereshe dialect of Albanian (see Albanians in Italy and Arbëreshë people).
Andorra	1 February 1995	Both countries established diplomatic relations on 1 February 1995. Italy is represented in Andorra through its embassy in Madrid (Spain) and an honorary consulate in Andorra La Vella.
Austria	27 January 1867	See Austria–Italy relations Both countries established diplomatic relations on 27 January 1867 when has been appointed first Envoy Extraordinary and minister Plenipotentiary of Italy to Austro-Hungary Giulio Camillo De Barral De Monteauvrard.: Austria has an embassy in Rome, a general consulate in Milan and 10 honorary consulates (in Bari, Bologna, Florence, Genoa, Naples, Palermo, Trieste, Turin, Venice and Verona).; Italy has an embassy in Vienna, a consulate in Innsbruck, and 5 honorary consulates (in Graz, Klagenfurt, Linz, Rankweil and Salzburg).; Both countries are full members of the European Union and the Council of Europe.; There are around 315,000 local ethnic Austrians living in Italy (South Tyrol).
Belarus	13 April 1992	Both countries established diplomatic relations on 13 April 1992.: Belarus has an embassy in Rome and 2 honorary consulates (in Naples and Turin).; Italy has an embassy in Minsk.
Belgium	24 February 1851	Both countries established diplomatic relations on 24 February 1851 when has been appointed Envoy Extraordinary and Minister Plenipotentiary of Italy to Belgium Alberto Lupi Di Montalto.: Belgium has an embassy in Rome and a general consulate in Milan.; Italy has an embassy in Brussels, 2 general consulates (in Charleroi and Liège) and 2 consulates (in Genk and Mons).; Both countries are full members of the Organisation for Economic Co-operation and Development, of the European Union and of NATO.; There are around 450,000 people of Italian descent and around 255,000 Italian citizens living in Belgium (see Italian Belgians).
Bosnia and Herzegovina	1 February 1993	Both countries established diplomatic relations on 1 February 1993.: Italy has an embassy in Sarajevo and an honorary consulate in Banja Luka.
Bulgaria	25 July 1879	See Bulgaria–Italy relations Both countries established diplomatic relations on 25 July 1879.: Bulgaria has an embassy in Rome, a general consulate in Milan and 6 honorary consulates (in Ancona, Florence, Genoa, Naples, Turin and Treviso).; Italy has an embassy in Sofia and an honorary consulate in Plovdiv and Stara Zagora.; Both countries are full members of the European Union and NATO.
Croatia	17 January 1992	See Croatia–Italy relations Both countries established diplomatic relations on 17 January 1992.: Croatia has an embassy in Rome, 2 general consulates (in Milan and Trieste), and 5 honorary consulates (in Bari, Florence, Montemitro, Naples, and Padua).; Italy has an embassy in Zagreb, a general consulate in Rijeka, a consulate in Split and 2 honorary consulates (in Buje and Pula).; Both countries are full members of the European Union, NATO, Council of Europe and of the Union for the Mediterranean.; There are around 19,500 local ethnic Italians (Istrian Italians and Dalmatian Italians) living in Croatia, whose number decreased following the Istrian–Dalmatian exodus.; There are 21,360 Croats, some of which are local ethnic, living in Italy (see Croats of Italy and Molise Croats).
Cyprus	12 September 1961	Both countries established diplomatic relations on 12 September 1961 when the first Ambassador of Italy to Cyprus, Pietro Solari presentation of credentials.: Cyprus has an embassy in Rome and 5 honorary consulates (in Genoa, Milan, Naples, Perugia and Augusta).; Italy has an embassy in Nicosia and 2 honorary consulates (in Limassol and Larnaca).; Both countries are full members of the European Union, the Council of Europe and of the Union for the Mediterranean.; There are long cultural and historical ties between the two countries, as Cyprus has been part of the Roman Empire and has been a Venetian Kingdom, while there are Greek-speaking minorities in Italy.; Cyprus recognises Latins, the descendants of the Roman Catholic Venetian families that were settled in the island, as a protected minority, and grants the representation in the Parliament.; Cyprus Foreign Affairs: List of bilateral treaties with Italy
Czech Republic	24 October 1918	See Czech Republic–Italy relations Both countries established diplomatic relations on 24 October 1918.: The Czech Republic has an embassy in Rome, a general consulate in Milan, and 5 honorary consulate (in Florence, Naples, Palermo, Udine, and Venice).; Italy has an embassy in Prague and an honorary consulate in Brno.; Both countries are full members of NATO and of the European Union.
Denmark	2 September 1861	See Denmark–Italy relations: Denmark has an embassy in Rome and 16 consulates (in Ancona, Bari, Cagliari, Florence, Genoa, La Spezia, Livorno, Messina, Milan, Naples, Palermo, Sanremo, Taormina, Turin, Trieste and Venice).; Italy has an embassy in Copenhagen, and two honorary vice-consulates in Aalborg and Thorshavn.; Both countries are full members of the European Union and NATO.; There are 2,084 Danes living in Italy.; There are 6,600 Italians living in Denmark.
Estonia	31 August 1991	See Estonia–Italy relations: Italy recognised Estonia on 26 January 1921. Italy re-recognised Estonia on 27 August 1991.; Estonia has an embassy in Rome and six honorary consulates (in Cagliari, Florence, Genoa, Milan, Naples and Turin).; Italy has an embassy in Tallinn.; There are over 200 Estonians living in Italy.; There are 1,407 Italians living in Estonia.; Both countries are full members of NATO and of the European Union.; Estonian Ministry of Foreign Affairs about the relation with Italy
Finland	6 September 1919	See Finland–Italy relations Both countries established diplomatic relations on 6 September 1919.: Italy recognised Finland's independence on June 27, 1919.; Italy is represented in Finland through its embassy in Helsinki and its honorary consulates in Hanko, Jyväskylä, Kotka, Kuopio, Oulu, Pori, Rovaniemi, Tampere, Turku and Vaasa.; Finland has an embassy in Rome, two honorary consulate generals in Milan and Turin and other honorary consulates in Genoa, Bari, Cagliari, Catania, Florence, Livorno, Messina, Naples, Palermo, Rimini, Trieste and Venice.; There are 4,000 Finns living in Italy.; There are around 3,000 people of Italian descent living in Finland (see Italians in Finland).; Both countries are full members of the European Union and NATO.; Italy fully supported Finland's application to join NATO, which resulted in membership on 4 April 2023.; Finnish Ministry for Foreign Affairs: relations with Italy
France	25 July 1861	See France–Italy relations: Italy has embassy in Paris and consulates in Bordeaux, Lyon, Lourdes, Marseille, Metz, Nice, Toulon, Toulouse, Saint-Denis, Réunion, Fort-de-France (Martinique), Kourou (French Guiana), Pointe-à-Pitre (Guadeloupe), Nouméa (New Caledonia).; France has an embassy in Rome and consulates in Ancona, Aosta, Bari, Bologna, Brindisi, Cagliari, Catania, Cosenza, Florence, Genoa, La Spezia, Livorno, Milan, Naples, Palermo, Parma, Perugia, Pescara, Reggio Calabria, Sassari, Trento, Trieste, Turin, Venice, and Ventimiglia.; There are around 116,000 local ethnic French living in Italy (Aosta Valley).; There are around 5,444,000 people of partial Italian descent living in France (see Italians in France).
Germany	20 April 1871	See Germany–Italy relations Both countries established diplomatic relations on 20 April 1871 when has been appointed first Ambassador Extraordinary and Minister Plenipotentiary of Italy to Germany Edoardo De Launay.: Ties between these two nations can be traced back to the time when they were part of the Holy Roman Empire and German Confederation.; Relations were established after the Unification of Italy.; Both countries enjoy friendly relations and were members of the Axis during World War II, formed an alliance during the Cold War (West Germany), and are full members of the European Union.; Italy has an embassy in Berlin and consulates in Frankfurt, Freiburg, Hamburg, Hanover, Munich, Nuremberg, Saarbrücken, and Stuttgart.; Germany has an embassy in Rome and consulates in Milan and Naples.; There are 280,000 Germans living in Italy.; There are 648.360 Italian citizens (2020) living in Germany (see Italians in Germany).
Greece	12 May 1861	See Greece–Italy relations: Relations are excellent, due to the shared heritage and common interests of both countries. More than two millennia of shared heritage and Greco-Italian relations strengthened the bonds between the two countries.; Italy has an embassy in Athens, and 15 honorary consulates in Alexandroupoli, Kefalonia, Chania, Chios, Corfu, Corinth, Ioannina, Heraklion, Kavala, Larissa, Patras, Rhodes, Thessaloniki, Santorini, and Volos.; Greece has an embassy in Rome, 2 general consulates in Milan and Naples, a consulate in Venice, and 11 honorary consulates in Trieste (General), Turin (General), Ancona, Catania, Livorno, Bari, Bologna, Brindisi, Florence, Palermo, Perugia, and a Port Consulate in Genoa.; Both countries are full members of the Council of Europe, of the Organisation for Economic Co-operation and Development and of the European Union and NATO.; There are around 180,000 Greek Orthodox or people of Greek descent living in Italy, of which the majority lives in southern Italy and Sicily (see Greeks in Italy).; An approximation of 200,000 Roman Catholic Italians or people of Italian descent are living in Greece with the majority of them in the Ionian Islands, western Greece and the capital Athens (see Corfiot Italians and Italian colonists in the Dodecanese).
Holy See	24 June 1929	See Holy See–Italy relations Both countries established diplomatic relations on 24 June 1929. Due to the size of the Vatican City State, embassies accredited to the Holy See are based on Italian territory. Treaties signed between Italy and the Vatican City State permit such embassages. The Embassy of Italy to the Holy See is unique amongst foreign embassages in that it is the only embassy based on its home territory. The Holy See maintains formal diplomatic relations with 176 sovereign states, the European Union, and the Order of Malta; 69 of the diplomatic missions accredited to the Holy See are situated in Rome, though those countries than have two embassies in the same city, since, by agreement between the Holy See and Italy, the same person cannot be accredited simultaneously to both. This is shown clearly by the fact that Italy recognizes the People's Republic of China, and as such, the Chinese Embassy is in Rome. However, the Vatican City State recognizes the Taiwan, and as such, Taiwan's embassy to the Holy See is also in Rome. As Italy was the first country to recognize the Holy See as a sovereign nation, their embassy was the first one established.
Hungary	21 November 1920	Both countries established diplomatic relations on 21 November 1920 when has been appointed first Envoy Extraordinary and Minister Plenipotentiary of Italy to Hungary Gaetano Caracciolo Di Castagneto.: Hungary has an embassy in Rome, a general consulate in Milan, and 11 honorary consulates (in Bari, Bologna, Florence, Genoa, Naples, Palermo, Perugia, Trieste, Turin, Venice and Verona).; Italy has an embassy in Budapest and 3 honorary consulates (in Nyíregyháza, Pécs and Szeged).; Both countries are full members of the European Union and of NATO.; There are 9,000 Hungarians living in Italy.; There are 7,000 Italians living in Hungary.
Iceland	15 August 1945	Both countries established diplomatic relations on 15 August 1945.: Iceland has an embassy in Rome.; Italy is represented in Iceland through its embassy in Oslo (Norway) and an honorary consulate in Reykjavík.; Both countries are full members of the Council of Europe, of NATO and of Organisation for Economic Co-operation and Development.; There are 3,000 Icelanders living in Italy.; There are 208 Italians living in Iceland.
Ireland	27 September 1937	Both countries established diplomatic relations on 27 September 1937 when has been accredited first Envoy Extraordinary and Minister Plenipotentiary of Italy to Ireland Mr. Romano Lodi Fe.: Ireland has an embassy in Rome and an honorary consulate in Milan.; Italy has an embassy in Dublin. and an honorary consulate in Galway.; Both countries are full members of the European Union and the Council of Europe.; There are 15,000 Irish people living in Italy.; There are 7,656 Italians living in Ireland.
Kosovo	15 May 2008	See Italy–Kosovo relations Both countries established diplomatic relations on 15 May 2008. Italy recognized Kosovo on 21 February 2008. Italy has an embassy in Pristina since 15 May 2008. Kosovo will open an embassy in Rome.: There are upwards to 900,000 ethnic Albanians in Italy, many also from Kosovo.
Latvia	30 August 1991	Both countries re-established diplomatic relations on 30 August 1991.: Italy never officially recognised the annexation of the Baltic states by the USSR.; Both countries renewed their diplomatic relations on August 30, 1991.; Since 1992, Italy has an embassy in Riga.; Latvia has an embassy in Rome and 7 honorary consulates (in Bari, Florence, Milan, Modena, Naples, Palermo and Trieste). Both countries are full members of NATO and of the European Union.
Liechtenstein	11 December 1995	Both countries established diplomatic relations on 11 December 1995 when has been appointed Ambassador of Italy to Liechtenstein with residence in Berne Mr. Arduino Fornara.: Italy is represented in Liechtenstein through its embassy in Bern (Switzerland)
Lithuania	30 August 1991	Both countries re-established diplomatic relations on 30 August 1991.: Italy has an embassy in Vilnius.; Lithuania has an embassy in Rome and 6 honorary consulates (in Bari, Cagliari, Genoa, Milan, Turin and Venice).; Both countries are full members of NATO and of the European Union.; Lithuanian Ministry o Foreign Affairs: list of bilateral treaties with Italy (in Lithuanian only)
Luxembourg	7 February 1891	Both countries established diplomatic relations on 7 February 1891.: Italy has an embassy in Luxembourg City.; Luxembourg has an embassy in Rome and 9 honorary consulates (in Florence, Genoa, Milan, Naples, Palermo, Perugia, Riccione, Turin, and Venice).; Both countries are full members of the Organisation for Economic Co-operation and Development, of the European Union and of NATO.; There are around 19,000 people of Italian descent living in Luxembourg.
Malta	21 September 1964	See Italy–Malta relations Both countries established diplomatic relations on 21 September 1964.: Both countries established official diplomatic relations soon after Malta's independence.; Italy has an embassy in Valletta.; Malta has an embassy in Rome and 18 honorary consulates (in Bari, Bologna, Brescia, Cagliari, Catania, Genoa, L'Aquila, Livorno, Milan, Naples, Palermo, Perugia, Reggio Calabria, Savona, Syracuse, Turin, Trieste, and Venice).; Both countries are full members of the European Union and of the Union for the Mediterranean.
Moldova	21 February 1992	See Italy–Moldova relations Both countries established diplomatic relations on 21 February 1992.: Italy opened an Embassy in Chişinău. The actual Italian ambassador to Moldova with residence in Bucharest is Daniele Mancini.; Embassy of the Republic of Moldova in Rome; Italy is an EU member and Moldova is an EU candidate.; Italian Embassy in Bucharest; Ministry of Foreign Affairs of the Republic of Moldova; Italian Ministry of Foreign Affairs
Monaco	25 April 1875	See Italy–Monaco relations Both countries established diplomatic relations on 25 April 1875.: Italy has an embassy in Monaco.; Monaco has an embassy in Rome and an honorary consulate in Venice.
Montenegro	14 June 2006	See Italy–Montenegro relations: Italy recognized Montenegro's independence on June 14, 2006.; Montenegro has an embassy in Rome.; Both countries are full members of the Union for the Mediterranean, of NATO and of the Council of Europe.; Italy is an EU member and Montenegro is an EU candidate.
Netherlands	15 September 1859	See Italy–Netherlands relations: The Netherlands has an embassy in Rome, a general consulate in Milan, and 14 honorary consulates (in Ancona, Bari, Bologna, Cagliari, Catania, Florence, Genoa, Livorno, Naples, Palermo, Trieste, Turin, Venice and Verona).; Italy has an embassy in The Hague, a general consulate in Amsterdam and an honorary consulate in Willemstad (island of Curaçao).; Both countries are full members of the Organisation for Economic Co-operation and Development, of the European Union and of NATO.; Dutch Ministry of Foreign Affairs about the relation with Italy (in Dutch only)
North Macedonia	16 December 1993	Both countries established diplomatic relations on 16 December 1993.: Italy has an embassy in Skopje; North Macedonia has an embassy in Rome.; Both countries are full members of the Council of Europe and of NATO.
Norway	22 March 1906	Both countries established diplomatic relations on 22 March 1906.: Italy has an embassy in Oslo and consulates in Ålesund, Bergen, Stavanger, Tromsø and Trondheim.; Norway has an embassy in Rome.; Both countries are full members of the Council of Europe and of NATO.
Poland	27 February 1919	See Italy–Poland relations Both countries established diplomatic relations on 27 February 1919.: In 1918, Italy was the first country in Europe to recognise Poland's sovereignty.; Italy has an embassy in Warsaw and 2 honorary consulates (in Gdynia and Kraków).; Poland has an embassy in Rome and 2 general consulates (in Catania and Milan).; Both countries are full members of the Council of Europe, of the Organisation for Economic Co-operation and Development, of NATO and of the European Union.; There are around 100,000 Poles living in Italy.; Both of the countries' largest religion is Roman Catholicism.
Portugal	24 October 1860	See Italy–Portugal relations Both countries established diplomatic relations on 24 October 1860 when has been appointed first Chargé d'Affaires of Italy to Portugal Minerva Domenico Pes Di San Vittorio.: Italy has an embassy in Lisbon and honorary consulates in Faro, Funchal and Porto.; Portugal has an embassy in Rome and honorary consulates in Milan, Turin, Venice, Trieste, Genoa, Florence, Livorno, Naples, Bari and Palermo.; Both countries are full members of the European Union and NATO.
Romania	26 December 1879	See Italy–Romania relations Both countries established diplomatic relations on 26 December 1879.: Italy has an embassy in Bucharest, a general consulate in Timișoara, and 4 honorary consulates (in Cluj-Napoca, Constanţa, Craiova and Piatra Neamț).; Romania has an embassy in Rome, a general consulate in Milan and 3 honorary consulate (in Florence, Genoa and Treviso).; Both countries are full members of the NATO and of the European Union.; There are 1,137,728 Romanian citizens (2020) living in Italy (see Italians of Romanian descent).; There are around 3,203 people of Italian descent living in Romania (see Italians in Romania).
Russia	2 July 1862	See Italy–Russia relations Russia has an embassy in Rome and consulates in Genoa, Milan and Palermo, and Italy has an embassy in Moscow, a consulate in Saint Petersburg, two consulte generals (in Ekaterinburg and Kaliningrad), and two embassy branches in (Samara and Volgograd). Both countries are full members of the Council of Europe and the Organization for Security and Co-operation in Europe. In 2006, Russia and Italy have signed a protocol of cooperation for fighting crime and defending civil liberties. The relationship between Russia and Italy goes back a long way. Already in the 1960s, Italy's FIAT built a car-assembling plant in the Soviet city of Tolyatti (a city named after the Italian Communist Party's secretary Palmiro Togliatti). In the past, Russians visited Italy in great numbers. Many Russian students came to Italy each year to study in Italian universities. The Silvio Berlusconi Government (2001–2006) strengthened Italy's ties with Russia, due to his personal friendship with President Vladimir Putin. Cooperation extended also to the aviation sector, between Italy's Alenia and Russia's Sukhoi. Finally, for a long time Italy had the largest communist party in the Western world, with over 2 million members. . Good relations ended in 2022 after the invasion of Russia in Ukraine.
San Marino		See Italy–San Marino relations: Italy has an embassy in San Marino.; San Marino has an embassy in Rome.
Serbia	18 January 1879	See Italy–Serbia relations Both countries established diplomatic relations on 18 January 1879.: Italy has an embassy in Belgrade.; Serbia has an embassy in Rome and 2 general consulates (in Milan and Trieste).; There are around 55,000 people of Serbian descent living in Italy (see Serbs in Italy).; Serbian Ministry of Foreign Affairs about relations with Italy; Italy is an EU member and Serbia is an EU candidate.
Slovakia	1 January 1993	Both countries established diplomatic relations on 1 January 1993.: Italy has an embassy in Bratislava.; Slovakia has an embassy in Rome.; Both countries are full members of the European Union and NATO.
Slovenia	17 January 1992	See Italy–Slovenia relations Both countries established diplomatic relations on 17 January 1992.: Italy has an embassy in Ljubljana and a consulate in Koper.; Slovenia has an embassy in Rome and a general consulate in Trieste.; Both countries are full members of the European Union and NATO.; There are around 2,000 local ethnic Italians (Istrian Italians) living in Slovenia, whose number decreased following the Istrian–Dalmatian exodus.; There are around 100,000 local ethnic Slovenians living in Italy (see Slovene minority in Italy).
Spain	5 May 1856	See Italy–Spain relations Both countries established diplomatic relations on 5 May 1856 when has been appointed first Envoy Extraordinary and Minister Plenipotentiary of Italy to Spain barone Romualdo Tecco. Both countries established diplomatic relations after the unification of Italy. Relations between Italy Spain have remained strong and affable for centuries owing to various political, cultural, and historical connections between the two nations.: Italy has an embassy in Madrid and consulate-general in Barcelona and Vice-consulate Arona.; Spain has an embassy in Rome and consulates-general in Milan and Naples.; Both countries are full members of the European Union and NATO.; There are around 228,283 Italian citizens living in Spain (see Italians in Spain).
Sweden	27 March 1862	See Italy–Sweden relations: Italy has an embassy in Stockholm and consulates in Gothenburg, Karlstad, Luleå, Malmö, Sundsvall and Umeå.; Sweden has an embassy in Rome.; Both countries are full members of the European Union and NATO.; Italy fully supported Sweden's application to join NATO, which resulted in membership on 7 March 2024.; There are around 19,087 people of Italian descent living in Sweden (see Swedish Italians).
Switzerland	27 March 1861	See Italy–Switzerland relations: Italy has an embassy in Bern and consulates-general in Geneva, Lugano and Zürich and a consulate in Basel.; Switzerland has an embassy in Rome and a consulate-general in Milan.; There are around 720,000 local ethnic Italians living in Switzerland (Canton Ticino and Canton of Grigioni).; There are around 295,000 people of Italian descent living in Switzerland (see Italian immigration to Switzerland).
Ukraine	29 January 1992	See Italy–Ukraine relations Both countries established diplomatic relations on 29 January 1992.: Italy has an embassy in Kyiv (see Embassy of Italy, Kyiv).; Ukraine has an embassy in Rome (see Embassy of Ukraine, Rome), a general consulate in Milan and 4 honorary consulates (in Bari, Florence, Genoa, Naples, Padua and Reggio Calabria).; Both countries are full members of the Council of Europe.; Italy is an EU member and Ukraine is an EU candidate.; There are around 380,000 people of Ukrainian descent living in Italy (see Ukrainians in Italy).; There are around 3,000 people of Italian descent living in Ukraine (see Italians of Crimea).
United Kingdom	13 April 1859	See Italy–United Kingdom relations Italy established diplomatic relations with the United Kingdom on 13 April 1859.: Italy maintains an embassy in London.; The United Kingdom is accredited to Italy through its embassy in Rome, and a consulate general in Milan.; Both countries share common membership of the Council of Europe, the European Court of Human Rights, G7, G20, the International Criminal Court, NATO, the OECD, the OSCE, and the World Trade Organization. Bilaterally the two countries have an Export and Investment Partnership, and a Double Taxation Convention.

=== Oceania ===
Country	Beginning of formal relations	Notes
Australia	4 February 1949	See Australia–Italy relations Both countries established diplomatic relations on 4 February 1949.: Australia has an embassy in Rome and a general consulate in Milan.; Italy has an embassy in Canberra, 2 general consulates (in Melbourne and Sydney) and 3 consulates (in Adelaide, Brisbane and Perth).; There are around 1,000,013 people of Italian descent living in Australia (see Italian Australian); Australian Department of Foreign Affairs and Trade about the relation with Italy
Fiji	13 October 1972	Both countries established diplomatic relations on 13 October 1972.
New Zealand	22 August 1950	Both countries established diplomatic relations on 22 August 1950.: Italy has an embassy in Wellington and 3 honorary consulates (in Auckland, Christchurch and Dunedin).; New Zealand has an embassy in Rome.; New Zealand had a large force in Italy during WW2, and confronted the Yugoslav army in Trieste, thus liberating the city.; New Zealand Ministry of Foreign Affairs and Trade about relations with Italy; There are around 3,795 people of Italian descent living in New Zealand (see Italian New Zealanders)
Vanuatu		Italy has an honorary consulate in Port Vila.

== International institutions ==
Italy is part of the UN, EU, NATO, the OECD, the OSCE, the DAC, the WTO, the G7, the G20, the Union for the Mediterranean, the Latin Union, the Council of Europe, the Central European Initiative, the ASEM, the MEF, the ISA, the Uniting for Consensus and several Contact Groups.

== Nobel Prizes ==
Swiss Nobel laureates
1907	Portrait of Ernesto Teodoro Moneta	Ernesto Teodoro Moneta	20 September 1833 in Milan, Austrian Empire	10 February 1918 in Milan	Peace	"for his work in the press and in peace meetings, both public and private, for an understanding between France and Italy" prize shared with Louis Renault

== See also ==
- Diplomatic history of World War II#Italy
- International relations of the Great Powers (1814–1919)
- List of diplomatic missions in Italy
- List of diplomatic missions of Italy
- Treaty of Osimo, 1975 with Yugoslavia
- Treaty of Rapallo, 1920
- Visa requirements for Italian citizens
- List of international trips made by prime ministers of Italy
