= Italian protectorate over Albania =

Italian protectorate over Albania may refer to:

- Italian campaign in Albania (World War I) (1916–1919)
- Treaties of Tirana, which created a de facto Italian protectorate in the 1920s
- Kingdom of Albania in personal union with Italy during World War II (1939–1943)
