= Kosovo–Malaysia relations =

- Kosovo: Malaysia

Diplomatic mission
- Kosovan Embassy, Kuala Lumpur: Malaysian Embassy, Pristina

Envoy
- Ambassador Abdul Malik Melvin Castelino Anthony

Kosovo–Malaysia relations (Albanian: Marrëdhëniet Kosovë-Malajzi; Serbian: Косовско-Малезијски односи Kosovsko-Malezijski odnosi; Malay: Hubungan Kosovo–Malaysia; Jawi: هوبوڠن كوسوۏو–مليسيا) are foreign relations between Kosovo and Malaysia. Formal relations between the two countries first began in 2000, when Malaysia became the first Asian country to establish a liaison office in Kosovo. Kosovo declared its independence from Serbia on 17 February 2008 and Malaysia recognised it on 30 October 2008.

== Pre-independence relations ==
Since 1999, immediately after Kosovo came under United Nations administration, Malaysia agreed to send peacekeepers as part of the United Nations Interim Administration Mission in Kosovo. Later that year, in September, Malaysia began to make plans for "a centre to coordinate medical relief aid and missions to help Kosovo war victims," and began raising funds for assistance to Kosovo.

In September 2000, these plans finally took effect when Malaysia established a liaison office in Kosovo "to coordinate Malaysian assistance and to liaise with the Malaysian security personnel assigned to the United Nations," becoming the sixth country, and the first in Asia, to establish such an office. The establishment of the office was in line with a broader Malaysian policy of self-determination in the Balkans, and a concern for the large Muslim population of Kosovo. The liaison office in Kosovo quickly began to disburse Malaysian aid, totalling more than $300,000 in the first year, including money to construct a mosque and purchase medical supplies for a hospital in Pristina.

In the fall of 2000, the Malaysian government also strongly supported holding elections in Kosovo as soon as possible. On 28 September 2000, the Malaysian ambassador to the United Nations, Datuk Hasmy Agam, praised the progress towards elections, but told the UN that free and fair elections could "only be guaranteed by the active support of the international community". In the same speech, Agam also strongly advocated for new UN efforts to promote security and stability in Kosovo, and expressed a strong desire to work on the issue of missing persons. After successful municipal elections in Kosovo in October 2000, Malaysia pushed for a Kosovo-wide general election.

On 18 September 2000, the first group of Malaysian policemen sent to Kosovo returned home. The next month, Malaysia sent a deployment of one hundred policemen to continue assisting the UN security effort. All of the Malaysian forces to serve in Kosovo up to that time received a medal and letter of appreciation in recognition of their services.

== Recognition ==
Kosovo declared its independence from Serbia on 17 February 2008. The Malaysian foreign ministry issued a statement welcoming the declaration, and saying: "Malaysia hopes the declaration of independence fulfils the aspiration of the people of Kosovo to decide their own future and ensure the rights of all to live in peace, freedom and stability". Despite its supportive statement, Malaysia did not immediately recognise Kosovo, and Malaysian foreign minister Rais Yatim, issued a statement in April saying that Malaysia was "not in hurry to impose recognition or otherwise".

In August, after a meeting with the Serbian foreign minister, Malaysia decided to put the issue of Kosovo's recognition on hold until a ruling of the International Court of Justice on the legality of the declaration. Kosovo, however, sought to pressure Malaysia for earlier recognition. In September 2008, Kosovo's foreign minister, Skënder Hyseni, met with Rais and asked him "to recognise Kosovo as an independent and sovereign state as soon as possible". Rais provided Hyseni with a promise that Malaysia "would recognise Kosovo very soon, and would work on establishing diplomatic relations between the two countries". The Albanian Foreign Minister Edit Harxhi also made a similar request to Malaysia to recognise the newly formed country.

As Rais had promised, Malaysia did not wait for the ICJ decision, and recognised Kosovo on 30 October 2008. As a result of Malaysia's recognition, Serbia immediately expelled the Malaysian ambassador. Despite the Serbian opposition, Malaysia maintained its support of Kosovo.

== Relations since recognition ==
Since recognition, Malaysia has assisted Kosovo in establishing internationally recognised sports leagues. In November 2008, Valton Beqiri, the Minister of Culture, Youth, and Sports of Kosovo visited Malaysia and met with Tunku Imran, Chairman of the Malaysian Olympic Committee, and member of the International Olympic Committee. Imran pledged assistance in gaining spots for athletes from Kosovo in international tournaments.

Malaysia initially planned to convert its liaison office in Kosovo into an embassy, but in January 2009, it closed the office and scrapped plans for an embassy for financial reasons due to re-organisation within the Malaysian foreign ministry. Malaysia now maintains an honorary consulate in Pristina.

The Republic of Kosovo President, Fatmir Sejdiu, travelled on 15 May 2010 to Malaysia, where at the invitation of Malaysian Prime Minister, he took part at the International Islamic Economic Forum and met with other Leaders of the Organisation of the Islamic Conference. At the forum, Sejdiu said that "On behalf of the Republic of Kosovo, I avail myself of this opportunity to express my sincere appreciation for the people and the state of Malaysia and for other countries that have acknowledged our right to live in freedom and independence".

On 8 March 2011, Kosovo and Malaysia established full diplomatic relations. The Malaysian embassy in Rome, Italy is accredited to Kosovo. On 30 January 2017, Kosovo's Foreign Minister Enver Hoxhaj and its delegates made a visit to Malaysia to discover opportunities in trade and business co-operation.

=== 2025 official visit to Malaysia ===
On 1 May 2025, the President of Kosovo, Vjosa Osmani Sadriu, travelled to Malaysia for a four-day long official visit. She landed at Kuala Lumpur International Airport, where she was received by Malaysia's Education Minister Fadhlina Sidek.

On the next day, she met with Malaysia's Prime Minister Anwar Ibrahim at Perdana Putra. There, she awarded Anwar the Order of Independence —the highest civilian honour of Kosovo— in recognition of Malaysia's support for Kosovo's statehood and post-independence development, and also Anwar's personal commitment in strengthening bilateral relations.

In a joint press conference with Anwar, she described Malaysia as “more than just a friend to Kosovo”, but a “partner in our shared pursuit of peace, prosperity and progress”. In the same day, Osmani also officiated the opening of Kosovon Embassy in Kuala Lumpur. Osmani described the newly opened embassy as "a window through which Kosovo engages with the world".

During the embassy's opening ceremony, she also posthumously awarded the Order of Independence to the late prime minister of Malaysia, Abdullah Ahmad Badawi, whom she met in 2008, for his support of Kosovo's independence and his efforts to garner international backing for Kosovo. Under Abdullah's leadership, Malaysia is one of the first countries to recognise Kosovo's independence. The award was received on Abdullah's behalf by his son-in-law, Khairy Jamaludin.

In an interview with RTM and Bernama, Osmani hailed the recent granting of 30-day visa-free entry to Kosovo citizens by the Malaysian government on 25 April 2025 as a new milestone that will further boost the two nations’ ties. Osmani said Kosovo had previously granted 90-day visa-free entry to Malaysian citizens sometime ago, and now Malaysia has reciprocated the move.

On 3 May, after visiting the Islamic Arts Museum Malaysia, Osmani visited Abdullah's grave and paid her respects to him at the Heroes' Mausoleum of National Mosque in Kuala Lumpur, together with some of Abdullah's family members. Osmani concluded her official visit in Malaysia the next day and left for Brunei.

== See also ==
- Foreign relations of Kosovo
- Foreign relations of Malaysia
