= Indonesia–Italy relations =

- Indonesia: Italy

Diplomatic mission
- Embassy of Indonesia Rome: Embassy of Italy Jakarta

Indonesia and Italy established diplomatic relations on 29 December 1949. Italy has shown strong desire to improve its relations with Indonesia, especially in intercultural understanding and trade. Indonesia recognizes Italy's strategic location and important role in the middle of Mediterranean region, while Italy has favoured relations with Indonesia, and sees Indonesia as the leader in Southeast Asia. The relations between two countries not only important to bridge the two regional communities; European Union and ASEAN, but also vital as intercultural and interfaith dialog, since Indonesia has the largest Muslim population in the world, and Italy is the heart of the Catholic faith.

Indonesia has an embassy in Rome, that also accredited to Malta, Cyprus, San Marino, and international organizations such as FAO, IFAD, WFP, and UNIDROIT, while Italy has an embassy in Jakarta.

== History ==
Italian explorers were among the first Europeans that reached the Indonesian archipelago. The pioneers' reports provided initial information on Asia for later European explorers to follow during the Age of Exploration. In the late 13th-century, Marco Polo made a stop in Samudra Pasai, Aceh, Northern Sumatra, on his way back from East Asia. In the early 14th-century, Mattiussi, a Franciscan friar, visited several places in today's Indonesia: Sumatra, Java, and Banjarmasin in Borneo, between 1318 and 1330. In his report, he described the gilded palace of the Javanese King and the war to the Great Khan of the Yuan dynasty. Specifically, Mattiussi visited the court of the Majapahit king Jayanegara in Trowulan.

Diplomatic relations started with Italian recognition to Republic of Indonesia on 29 December 1949. Official Indonesian representation in Rome was established in March 1952, while the Italian Republic had established its official representative in Jakarta in October 1952. In December 1953, both governments agreed to upgrade the status of their representatives in Rome and Jakarta into embassies.

== State visits ==
In 1997, the Prime Minister of Italy Romano Prodi visited Indonesia, and in 2002 the President of Indonesia, Abdurrahman Wahid, had his official visit to Italy, followed by President Megawati Soekarnoputri's visit in 2003. The Ministers of Foreign Affairs of the two countries signed an MoU of the establishment of Bilateral Consultation Forum in March 2009. In 23–24 April 2012, Italian Minister of Foreign Affairs Giulio Terzi visited Indonesia to attend the EU-ASEAN Summit. In 2015, President Sergio Mattarella visited Indonesia, which was followed by several diplomatic exchanges, including Indonesian Foreign Minister Retno Marsudi visiting Italy in October 2017 and Italian Foreign Minister Angelino Alfano visiting Indonesia in 2018. During Italy's G20 leadership, President Jokowi of Indonesia attended the summit in Rome, and Prime Minister Meloni attended the G20 conference in Indonesia from November 15-16, 2022 in Bali. 2024 marked the 75th anniversary of diplomatic relations between the two countries, and they both aim to enhance existing co-operation.

== Trade and investment ==
In 2012, the bilateral trade figures reached US$4.5 billion. The Italian government describes Indonesian proposal to boost bilateral trade as extremely attractive, and both countries noted there is room for growth.

== Interculture and interfaith dialogue ==
As the nation with the largest Muslim population, with a democratic government that values diversity, Italy recruited Indonesia on its efforts to pursue world peace through interfaith dialogue in 2009. Italy and Indonesia share their determination to work for peace in the Middle East as well as concern over human rights and commitment to fighting fundamentalist-inspired terrorism. Italy complements Indonesia's quality of cultural diversity and its potential role to become the bridge between the West and Islam.

== See also ==
- Foreign relations of Italy
- Foreign relations of Indonesia
- Holy See–Indonesia relations
