= Italy–Malaysia relations =

- Italy: Malaysia

Diplomatic mission
- Italian Embassy, Kuala Lumpur: Malaysian Embassy, Rome

Envoy
- Ambassador Cristiano Maggipinto: Ambassador Abdul Malik Melvin Castelino Anthony

Italy–Malaysia relations (Italian: Relazioni bilaterali tra Italia e Malaysia; Malay: Hubungan Itali–Malaysia) are the foreign relations between the two countries, Italy and Malaysia. Italy has an embassy in Kuala Lumpur, and Malaysia has an embassy in Rome.

Precedent relations came in the form of diplomatic contact between Sultan Abu Bakar of future constituent entity Johore with King Vittorio Emanuele II in 1871 who his representative Captain Carlo Alberto Racchia bestowed the Knight Commander of the Order of the Crown of Italy to Abu Bakar on his behalf.

== Economic relations ==
Italy is Malaysia's fifth largest trading partner in the European Union. Currently Italy is interested in investing in Malaysia and since March 2009 around 871.9 million MYR has been invested to the country. A number of documents also signed by both sides to forge closer ties between them. In the first four months of 2009, total trade between the two countries amounted to 2.033 billion MYR, with Malaysian exports to Italy totalling 875.3 million MYR and imports from Italy amounting to 1.158 billion MYR. Some major Malaysian companies operating in Italy include the national oil and gas corporation, Petronas.

== Resident diplomatic missions ==
- Italy has an embassy in Kuala Lumpur.
- Malaysia has an embassy in Rome.

== See also ==
- Foreign relations of Italy
- Foreign relations of Malaysia
