= Italy–North Korea relations =

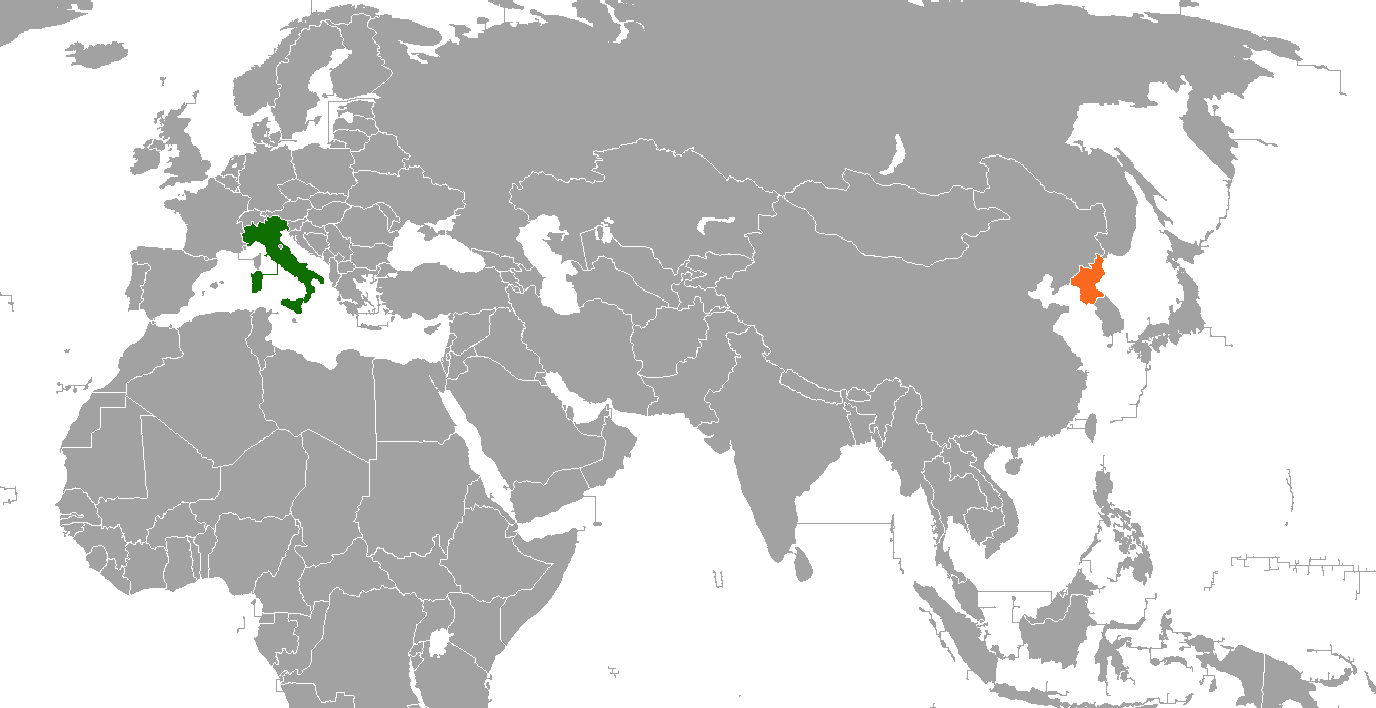

- Italy: North Korea

Diplomatic relations between Italy and North Korea have existed since 5 January 2000. Italy was the first G7 nation to open diplomatic relations with North Korea. Italy previously had diplomatic relations with the Empire of Korea. Italy is one of 46 countries that hosts an embassy from North Korea. In 2018, the North Korean ambassador to Italy defected to South Korea.

== History ==
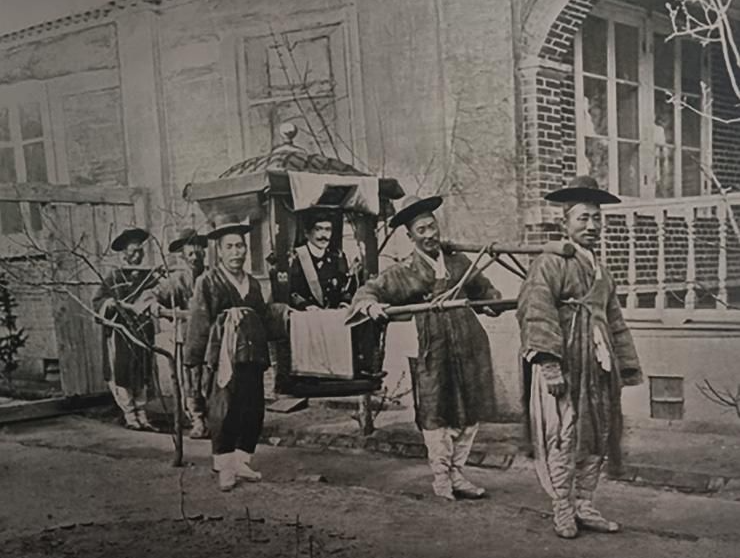
Consul Carlo Rossetti being carried in a litter

The Kingdom of Italy had diplomatic relations with the Empire of Korea. In 1884, Italy became one of the first countries to establish diplomatic relations with Korea and a consulate was established in Seoul in 1902. The annexation of Korea by the Japanese Empire ended diplomatic relations.

On 5 January 2000, Italy became the first G7 nation and sixth European nation to establish diplomatic relations with North Korea. Antonio Razzi, a member of the Senate of the Republic, led a delegation to Pyongyang and reaffirmed Italy's support for peace between North Korea and South Korea. As of 2024, Italy is one of 46 countries that has an embassy from North Korea.

North Korea congratulated Giorgio Napolitano after his victory in the 2013 presidential election.

Italy expelled North Korean ambassador Mun Jong-nam in October 2017, in protest of a North Korean nuclear test. Italy was the fifth country to expel a North Korean ambassador that year after Spain, Mexico, Peru, and Kuwait. Jo Song-gil became acting ambassador for North Korea, but disappeared on 10 November 2018. He was reported to have sought asylum in a western country. In 2020, it was confirmed that he had defected to South Korea.

== Works cited ==
=== News ===
- "Italia-Corea del Nord, Napoli (FI): delegazione italiana per anniversario relazioni diplomatiche". Forza Italia News. 6 August 2019. Archived from the original on 7 July 2025.
- "North Korea ambassador to Italy 'disappears', says South". BBC. 3 January 2019. Archived from the original on 7 July 2025.
- Fifield, Anna (1 October 2017). "Italy becomes fifth country to expel North Korean ambassador". The Washington Post. Archived from the original on 19 November 2020.
- Seo, Yoonjung; Kwon, Jake; Hollingsworth, Julia (8 October 2020). "North Korean diplomat who went missing in Italy two years ago has defected to South Korea". CNN. Archived from the original on 7 July 2025.
- Stanley, Alessandra (5 January 2000). "Italy Opens North Korea Ties, First by a Big Western Nation". The New York Times. Archived from the original on 5 April 2023.
- Vogt, Zachary (3 April 2020). "The Unlikely Connection Between Italy and North Korea". Italics Magazine. Archived from the original on 29 May 2024.

=== Web ===
- "140th Anniversary of Italy–Korea Ties". Korea Foundation. Archived from the original on 7 July 2025.
- Bernal, Gabriela (29 January 2024). "Open and shut: North Korea sends a message with its embassy network". Lowy Institute. Archived from the original on 7 July 2025.
