= List of ambassadors of Malaysia to Italy =

Ambassador of Malaysia to Italy
- Incumbent; Abdul Malik Melvin Castelino Anthony since 2017
- Style: His Excellency
- Seat: Rome, Italy
- Appointer: Yang di-Pertuan Agong
- Inaugural holder: John Ng Hoon Kem
- Formation: 1975
- Website: www.kln.gov.my/web/ita_rome/home

The ambassador of Malaysia to the Italian Republic is the head of Malaysia's diplomatic mission to Italy. The position has the rank and status of an ambassador extraordinary and plenipotentiary and is based in the Embassy of Malaysia, Rome.

== List of heads of mission ==
=== Ambassadors to Italy ===
Ambassador	Term start	Term end
John Ng Hoon Kem	1975	28 May 1981
Kamaruddin Mohammed Ariff	4 September 1981	2 January 1984
Raja Mansur Raja Razman	24 January 1984	10 January 1987
Ismail Budin	9 February 1987	30 August 1989
Ting Wen Lian	1 September 1989	15 July 1994
Hsu King Bee	12 October 1994	27 November 1996
Ramanathan Vengadesan	7 March 1997	1 July 2000
Shamsudin Abdullah	5 July 2000	15 August 2003
Lily Zacharia	31 August 2003	17 November 2007
Ramli Naam	23 December 2008	20 May 2011
Halimah Abdullah	21 August 2011	16 March 2015
Abdul Samad Othman		23 October 2017
Abdul Malik Melvin Castelino Anthony	26 May 2018	Incumbent

== See also ==
- Italy–Malaysia relations
