= Italy–Venezuela relations =

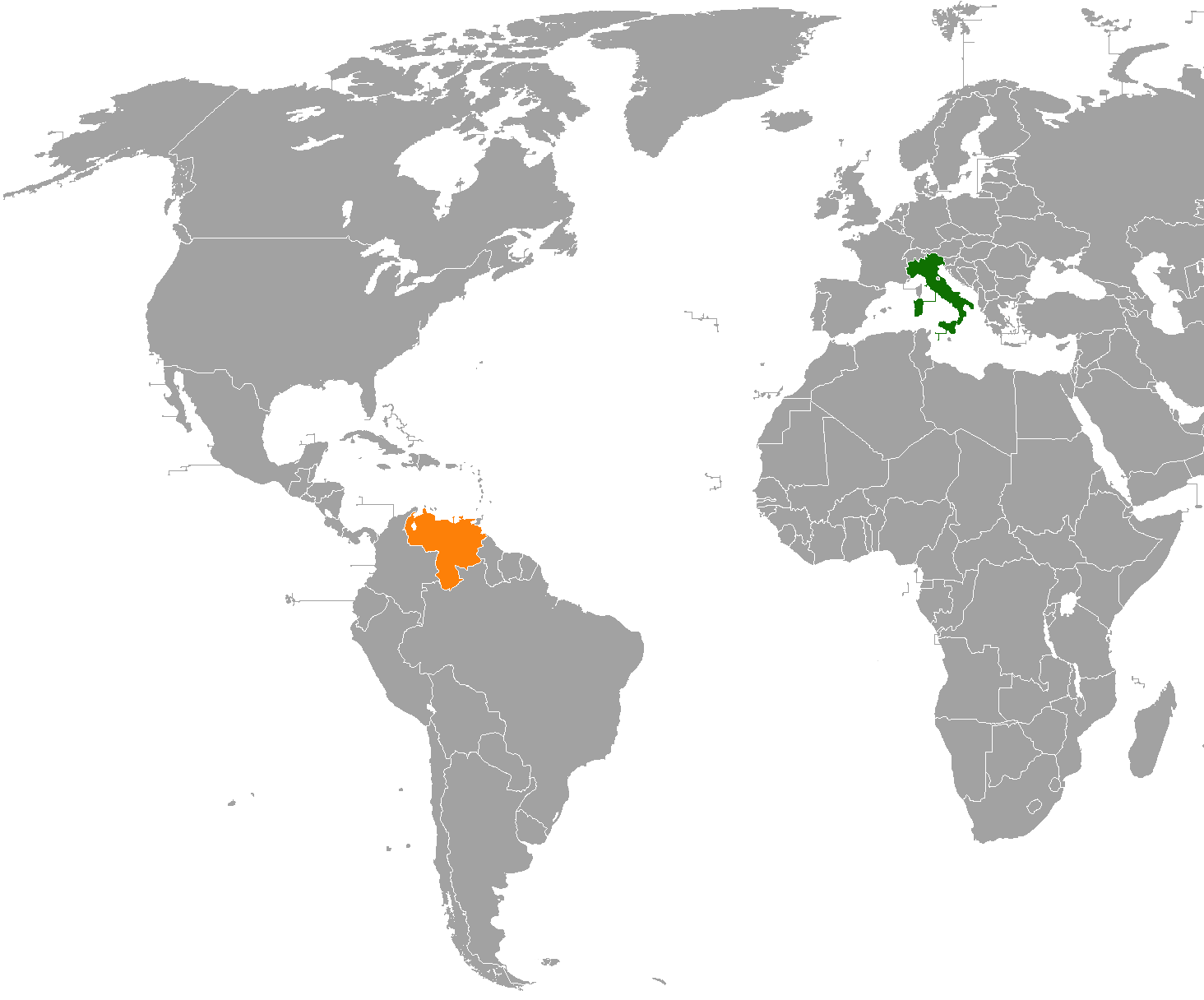
- Italy: Venezuela

Italy–Venezuela relations are the diplomatic relations between Italy and Venezuela. Both nations enjoy friendly relations, the importance of which centers on the history of Italian migration to Venezuela. There are approximately over 140,000 Italians living in Venezuela with more than a million Venezuelans of full or partial Italian descent.

== History ==
In 1498, Italian explorer Christopher Columbus (in the service for Spain) explored the Paria Peninsula on his third voyage. After the dissolution of Gran Colombia in 1831, Venezuela became an independent nation. In March 1856, Venezuela opened a consulate in Naples and in 1857, Italy opened a consular legation in the city of Maracaibo and then a second consular legation in La Guaira in 1859. In 1861, Italy and Venezuela signed a "Treaty of Friendship, Trade and Navigation". Venezuela was the first country in Latin America to recognize the Kingdom of Italy.

At the end of World War II, thousands of Italians left their homeland and immigrated to Venezuela with the majority settling in Caracas and Maracaibo. Several prominent Venezuelan politicians and well-known figures are of Italian descent.

In 1902, Italy joined the United Kingdom, Germany, and other foreign powers in the naval blockade of the Venezuelan coasts to claim the foreign debt that President Cipriano Castro refused to pay.

At the end of World War II, thousands of Italians left their homeland and migrated to Venezuela, with most settling in Caracas and Maracaibo. Several prominent Venezuelan politicians and well-known figures are of Italian descent.

In 2017, the Venezuelan government protested against Italy's recommendation to release political prisoner Leopoldo López. In March 2018, Italian Vice-Minister for Italians abroad, Luigi Maria Vignali, paid a visit to Venezuela to assess the situation of approximately 140,000 Italian citizens living in Venezuela under economic duress. Since the crisis, over 50,000 Venezuelan citizens have immigrated to Italy, many of them also having Italian citizenship by descent.

== High-level visits ==
Presidential visits from Italy to Venezuela

- President Giuseppe Saragat (1965)
- President Oscar Luigi Scalfaro (1995)

Presidential visits from Venezuela to Italy

- President Raúl Leoni (1965)
- President Carlos Andrés Pérez (1976)
- President Jaime Lusinchi (1988)
- President Hugo Chávez (1999, 2001, 2006)
- President Nicolás Maduro (2013, 2016)

== Bilateral agreements ==
Both nations have signed several bilateral agreements such as a Treaty of Friendship, Trade and Navigation (1862); Agreement on Agrarian Cooperation (1985); Agreement on Scientific and Technical Cooperation (1987); Agreement on the Promotion and Protection of Investments (1990) and an Agreement on the avoidance of Double-Taxation and Tax Evasion (1990).

== Trade ==
In 2017, trade between Italy and Venezuela totaled US$338 million. Italy's main exports to Venezuela are food based products. Venezuela's main exports to Italy include petrol, cement and coltan.

== Resident diplomatic missions ==
- Italy has an embassy in Caracas and a consulate in Maracaibo.
- Venezuela has an embassy in Rome and consulates-general in Milan and Naples.

== See also ==
- Italian language in Venezuela
- Italo-Venezuelans
- Crisis in Venezuela (2012–present)
