= Treaties of Tirana =

1926 and 1927 treaties between Albania and Italy

The Treaties of Tirana were signed in Tirana between Albania and Italy in the 1920s, bringing Albania into the Italian sphere of influence and gradually turning the Albanian state into a de facto protectorate of Italy.

== Background ==
=== The Kingdom of Albania ===
Flag Of The Kingdom Of Albania (1928-1934)

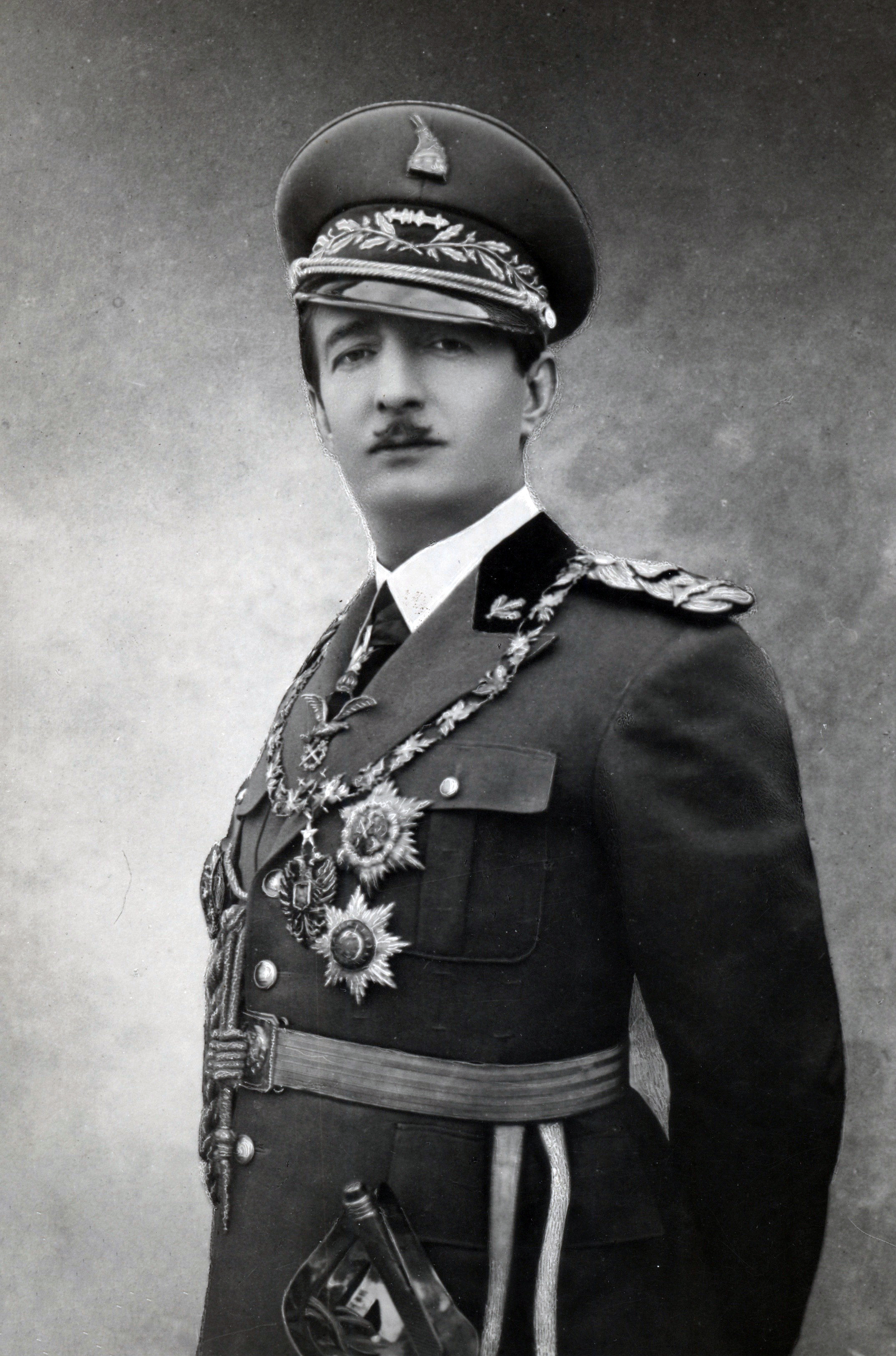
Ahmet Zogu, known as King Zog I, the King of the Albanians (1895-1961)

At the time of the signing of the treaties, the country of Albania was under the kingship of Zog I of Albania, known in Albanian as the king of the Albanians, Mbreti i Shqiptarëve. In 1925, Ahmet Zogu, was elected president for seven years and on 1 September 1928, during his swearing ceremony, he proclaimed himself as the King. Being the first and the last king of the Albanian nation, he served the country from 1922 until he fled to London during the start of the Second World War in 1939. Albania was thought by Italy as the portal for the rest of the Balkan countries, Greece, and the Near Eastern countries. In May 1925, Albania accepted the proposal of the Italians and the Albanian National Bank was founded. It acted as the country's treasury despite being solely controlled by the Italian banks. For the first time, Albania had its own national coin minted. The proposal came with a five-year loan equivalent of about 2 million pounds of that time. In non-official meetings with Italian officials, Zog expressed his sympathy for Mussolini and the Italians. He even promised economic concessions to them further piquing their interest in the country of Albania. From the beginning seizing the power as king of the Albanians, Zog wanted to:

1. Develop the Albanian economy.
2. Legitimise the power of the country and his sovereignty.
3. Achieve recognition of his government by neighbouring states. Zog knew that without any external support he would not be able to achieve these. Zog accepted to restore order in his country and help with its development. The 1925 agreement also oversaw mineral concessions of the Albanian land. During this time, the Italo-Albanian relations were favoured more and more by Italy. Mussolini had two orientations regarding the future of Albania. On one hand, it was a peaceful orientation for an Albanian economic diffusion until a de facto protectorate over Albania was achieved and on the other hand, for the accomplishment of a permanent imperialistic occupation. This weakened the King's economic hold and slowly gave way for the two Treaties to be signed by Zog and the Italian dictator, Mussolini.

== Tirana treaty of 1920 ==
A first treaty of Tirana between Italy and Albania was signed on 2 August 1920 to end hostilities between Italian troops and Albanian nationalists in the aftermath of World War I, some years before the rise to power of Mussolini in Italy and Zog in Albania. This agreement contained the following clause:

Italy undertakes to recognize and defend the autonomy of Albania and, retaining only Saseno, abandons Vallona.

Italy recognized Albania as independent (despite plans to create an Italian mandate over Albania) and abandoned Vlorë (Italian-occupied since 1914), while retaining a diplomatic protection to guarantee Albania's autonomy and annexing Saseno.

The Italian prime minister of the time, Giovanni Giolitti, described his decision to sign the treaty in the following terms.

"What really interests us is that Vallona cannot form a base of operations against us; and this aim was achieved with the occupation of the islet of Sasseno, which lies at the mouth of the bay itself...For these reasons, I decided to renounce the mandate conferred on us by the Paris Conference on Albania, which would have represented an enormous liability without any profit, and to limit our action to the diplomatic protection of Albania against the aims of other States, and to abandon Vallona, ensuring however recognition of the possession of Sasseno"

Mussolini upheld the treaty and unleashed the crisis of Corfu against Greece when an Italian mission sent to determine the Albanian-Greek borders was attacked by the Greeks.

== Tirana treaty of 1926 ==
On November 27, 1926, Italy signed with Albania the Pakti i Parë i Tiranës, the Treaty of Peace and Security, in Albanian Pakti Italo-Shqiptar i Miqësisë dhe i Sigurimit. The treaty had a duration validity of five years. It pushed Tirana to accept Italian officers and ranking members into their army and police to oversee the Albanian army and train it. King Zog fearing that the unrest of his people will lead to the loss of his throne, signed the treaty. Italy proclaimed Albania as its "guarantor". The two countries would provide support to each other, whether it be military or economic. The treaty consisted of five articles.

1. Anyone going against the existing Albanian status quo affairs would be seen as an enemy of both the Albanian and Italian states.
2. Both countries would not associate with other political or military agreements that harms the interests of each other.
3. Both parties are subjected to a special conciliation if issues that cannot be resolved via a diplomatic order arise.
4. The treaty shall remain in force for five years and may be denounced or renewed for one year before its end.
5. The treaty shall be ratified and registered with the League of Nations. The ratification will take place in Rome.

The treaty was accompanied by money provisions to the King making it more appealing for him to sign it by exploiting his desperation. Albania was blocked in the Balkan and European arena by Italy. The treaty brought reactions to Albania's neighbouring country, Yugoslavia. The country took military action against Albania's northern border with the support of France. Mussolini recognised the Franco-Yugoslav pact as an act against Italy.

== Tirana treaty of 1927 ==
On November 22, 1927, the Pakti i Dytë i Tiranës was signed between Albania and Italy, with a duration validity of twenty years. It was a defensive alliance characterised by the Italians as the Treaty of Defense, in Albanian Traktati i Aleancës Mbrojtëse. The internal threat of a famine triggering uprisings and the external threat of Yugoslavia rushed the Albanians to sign the treaty. It intended to remain a secret between the two countries. It tasked Italy to protect the Albanian territory from possible attacks and in return Albania made available to Italy all of its military arsenal. It was favoured by Italy because of its secretive nature. The Second Treaty consisted of seven articles.

1. All previously signed Treaties from the accession of Albania in the League of Nations will be examined carefully.
2. Inalienable alliance for twenty years unless one of the two countries states differently on the eighteenth or nineteenth year. If not, the treaty will quietly be renewed again.
3. Both countries will strive to assist one another to achieve peace. If one party is threatened, the other must provide effective means to stop the attack and provide satisfaction to the attacked party.
4. If all means of reconciliation are exhausted, the one party is obliged to use air force and military force, as well as a financial support to assist the attacked party.
5. In regards Article 4, neither party is allowed to amnesty, ceasefire or peace negotiations unless its agreed between both parties.
6. The treaty is signed in two Albanian and two Italian original copies. Four copies overall.
7. The treaty must be ratified by the respective parliaments and registered in the League of Nations. The ratification will take place in Rome.

It was characterised as a Friendship Pact, Pakti i Miqësisë, as it linked the two countries firmly to each other. The treaty allowed the Italians to bring two hundred and eighty officers to train the Albanian army. Military experts started to instruct Albanian paramilitary groups, whilst allowing in the meantime the Italian navy to access the port of Vlorė. Fortifications were also built, especially that of Librazhdit and conditions and rules were created for the protection of the capital. The treaty meant a lot more to the Italians as it enabled them to enter Albania freely, whether a real or fictional threat existed. Their doorway towards the Balkans had opened. Albania came into an inevitable relationship with Italy. In Rome, a ministry was created specifically to control the Albanian affairs and count Francesco Jacomoni was appointed minister to Albania.

== Aftermath ==
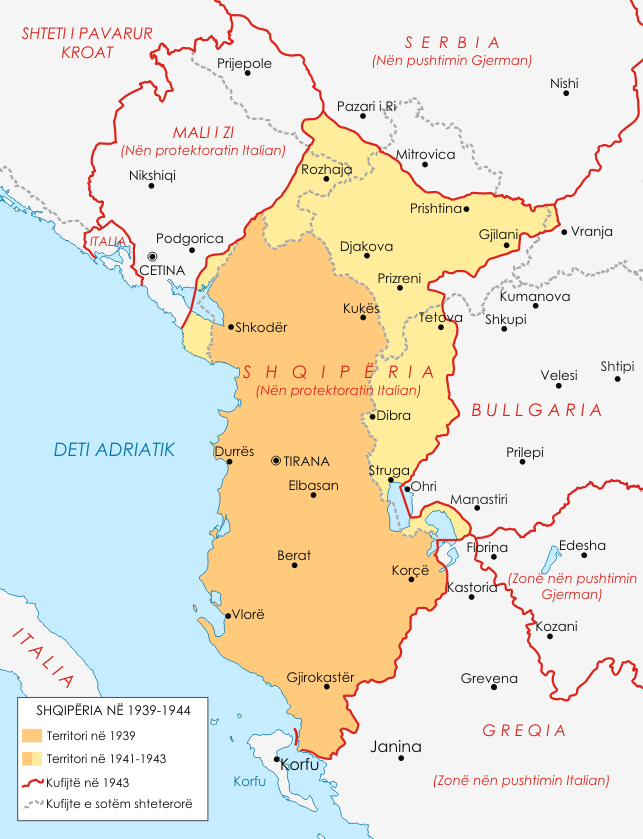
Albanian map during WWII

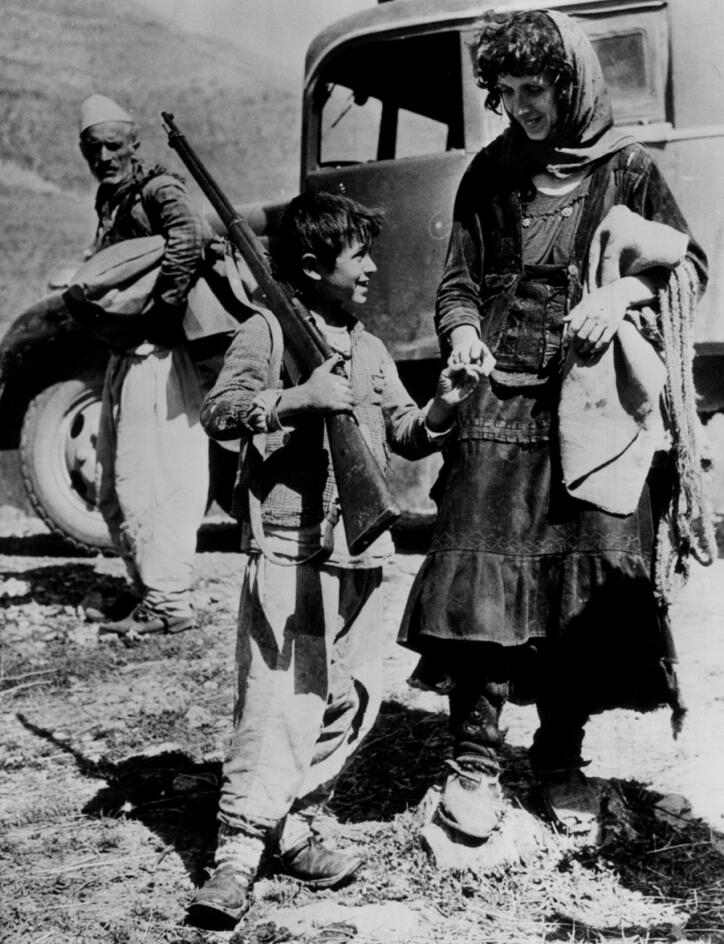
Albanian boy at the Albanian-Yugoslav border (1939)

In 1937, Ciano, the Italian Foreign Minister and Mussolini's son-in-law, mediated with Mussolini to give a further 60 million gold francs to Albania. He saw Albania as a gateway to the Balkans and wanted to expand his plans. This happened because:

1. Italy grew tired of Albania and its economic and socio-political problems.
2. Italy started to worry about problems of international politics as in 1936-1937 Europe everything started to shift rapidly, especially the political situation in Germany.

Italy occupied Albania in 1939 and declared it its protectorate. King Zog fled due to the Italian occupation of Albania on April 7, 1939. The crown of the country was formally given to the King of Italy, Victor Emmanuel III on 12 April. A fascist government was created by the Italians under the Albanian Prime Minister, Shefqet Verlaci.
