= Kingdom of Italy =

Country in Southern Europe (1861–1946)

Kingdom of Italy Regno d'Italia
- 1861–1946
- Top: State flag Bottom: Civil flag Greater coat of arms (1890–1927; 1944–1946) Greater coat of arms (1929–1944)
- Motto: FERT (Motto of the House of Savoy)
- Anthem: (1861–1943; 1944–1946) "Marcia Reale d'Ordinanza" ("Royal March of Ordinance"); (1924–1943) "Giovinezza" ("Youth"); (1943–1944) "La Leggenda del Piave" ("The Legend of Piave")
- Status: Sovereign state
- Capital: Turin (1861–1865); Florence (1865–1871); Rome (1871–1946); Brindisi (1943–1944; de facto)
- Largest city: Rome
- Official languages: Italian
- Religion: 96% Catholicism (state religion from 1929)
- Demonym: Italian
- Government: Constitutional monarchy: under a fascist dictatorship (1925–1943)
- King
  - 1861–1878: Victor Emmanuel II
  - 1878–1900: Umberto I
  - 1900–1946: Victor Emmanuel III
  - 1946: Umberto II
- Prime Minister (Note: Formally called as the President of Council of Ministers)
  - 1861 (first): Count of Cavour
  - 1922–1943: Benito Mussolini (Note: As Head of Government, Prime Minister, Secretary of State in 1925)
  - 1945–1946 (last): Alcide De Gasperi (Note: While the Kingdom of Italy ended in 1946, De Gasperi continued as Prime Minister of the Republic until 1953.)
- Legislature: Parliament (1861–1943); National Council (1945–1946)
  - Upper house: Senate
  - Lower house: Chamber of Deputies (1861–1939); Chamber of Fasces and Corporations (1939–1943)
- History
  - Proclamation: 17 March 1861
  - Third Italian War of Independence: 20 June 1866
  - Capture of Rome: 20 September 1870
  - Triple Alliance: 20 May 1882
  - Treaty of London: 26 April 1915
  - World War I: 23 May 1915
  - March on Rome: 28 October 1922
  - Lateran Treaty: 7 June 1929
  - Pact of Steel: 22 May 1939
  - World War II: 10 June 1940
  - Fall of Fascism: 24–25 July 1943
  - Monarchy abolished: 18 June 1946

Area
- 1861: 250,320 km^{2} (96,650 sq mi)
- 1936: 310,190 km^{2} (119,770 sq mi)

Population
  - 1861: 21,777,334
  - 1936: 42,993,602
- GDP (PPP): 1939 estimate
  - Total: 151 billion (2.82 trillion in 2019)
- Currency: Lira (₤)
Preceded by
1861: Kingdom of Sardinia
Kingdom of the Two Sicilies
1866: Kingdom of Lombardy–Venetia
1870: Papal States
1918: Austria-Hungary
1944: Kingdom of the South
1945: Italian Social Republic
Succeeded by
1929: Vatican City
1943: Italian Social Republic
1943: Kingdom of the South
1946: Italian Republic

The Kingdom of Italy (Note: Italian: Regno d'Italia, pronounced [ˈreɲɲo diˈtaːlja]) was a unitary state that existed from 17 March 1861, when Victor Emmanuel II, King of Sardinia, was proclaimed King of Italy, until 18 June 1946, when the monarchy was abolished, following civil discontent that led to an institutional referendum on 2 June, resulting in the establishment of the modern Italian Republic. The kingdom was established through the unification of several states over a decades-long process, called the Risorgimento. That process was influenced by House of Savoy-ruled Sardinia, which was one of Italy's legal predecessor states.

In 1866, the Third Italian War of Independence broke out; it was part of the Italo-Prussian Alliance against the Austrian Empire. Upon victory, Italy received Veneto. Italian troops captured Rome in 1870, ending the more than one thousand years of Papal temporal power.

In the last two decades of the 19th century, Italy developed into a colonial power, resulting to the establishment of the Italian Empire in 1882; that year, it entered into the 'Triple Alliance' with the German Empire and the Austro-Hungarian Empire, following strong disagreements with the French Third Republic about their respective colonial expansions. Although relations with Berlin became very friendly, the alliance with Vienna remained purely formal, due in part to Italy's desire to acquire Trentino and Trieste from Austria-Hungary. As a result, Italy accepted the British invitation to join the Allies of World War I in 1915. Victory in the war gave Italy a permanent seat in the Council of the League of Nations, but it did not receive all the territories it was promised.

In 1922, Benito Mussolini became prime minister and the National Fascist Party took control of the Italian government, thus ushering an era of the Fascist period in Italy known as "Fascist Italy". Authoritarian rule was enforced, crushing all political opposition while promoting economic modernization, traditional values, and territorial expansion. In 1929, the Italian government reconciled with the Roman Catholic Church through the Lateran Treaties, which granted independence to the Vatican City. The following decade presided over the Spazio vitale, an aggressive foreign policy that launched successful military operations in the Second Italo-Ethiopian War in 1935, Italian military intervention in Spain in 1937, and the Italian invasion of Albania in 1939. This led to economic sanctions, departure from the League of Nations, growing economic autarky, and the signing of the Pact of Steel and Anti-Comintern Pact with Nazi Germany and the Empire of Japan.

Italy entered World War II as a leading member of the Axis powers in 1940, and despite initial success, was defeated in the North African campaign and the Eastern Front. The Allied invasion of Sicily led to the fall of the Fascist regime. The new government surrendered to the Allies in September 1943 at the Armistice of Cassibile. German forces occupying northern and central Italy established the Italian Social Republic (ISR) and reappointed Mussolini as dictator, opening the Italian Civil War, where the National Republican Army of the ISR and its German allies contended with the Allied forces and the Italian Co-belligerent Army and Italian resistance movement. Shortly after the Surrender at Caserta of all Axis forces in Italy, civil discontent prompted an institutional referendum, which established a republic and abolished the monarchy in 1946.

== Territory ==
The Kingdom of Italy in 1924

The Kingdom of Italy covered and at times exceeded the land area of the successor Italian Republic. The kingdom gradually extended its area through the Italian unification until 1870. In 1919 it annexed Trieste and Trentino-Alto Adige/Südtirol. The Triple Entente of the Russian Empire, the French Third Republic, and the United Kingdom of Great Britain and Ireland promised to grant to Italy several regions, including former Austrian Littoral, western parts of former Duchy of Carniola, Northern Dalmatia and notably Zara, Šibenik and most of the Dalmatian islands (except Krk and Rab), according to the secret London Pact of 1915.

After the refusal by President Woodrow Wilson to acknowledge the London Pact and the signing of the Treaty of Versailles in 1919, with the Treaty of Rapallo in 1920 Italian claims on Northern Dalmatia were abandoned. During World War II, the kingdom gained additional territory in Slovenia (the province of Lubiana) and Dalmatia (the governatorate of Dalmatia) from the Kingdom of Yugoslavia after its breakup in 1941.

Until the end of World War II, Italy established and maintained colonies, protectorates, military occupations and puppet states beyond its borders. These included Italian Eritrea, Italian Somaliland, Italian Libya, Italian Ethiopia (annexed by Italy from 1936 to 1941), the Albanian Kingdom (an Italian protectorate since 1939), British Somaliland, part of Greece, Corsica, southeastern Vichy France and Monaco, French Tunisia, Kosovo, and Montenegro (all territories occupied in World War II), the Independent State of Croatia (Italian and German client state in World War II), and a 46-hectare concession from China in Tianjin. These foreign colonies and lands came under Italian control at different times and remained so over different periods.

== Government ==
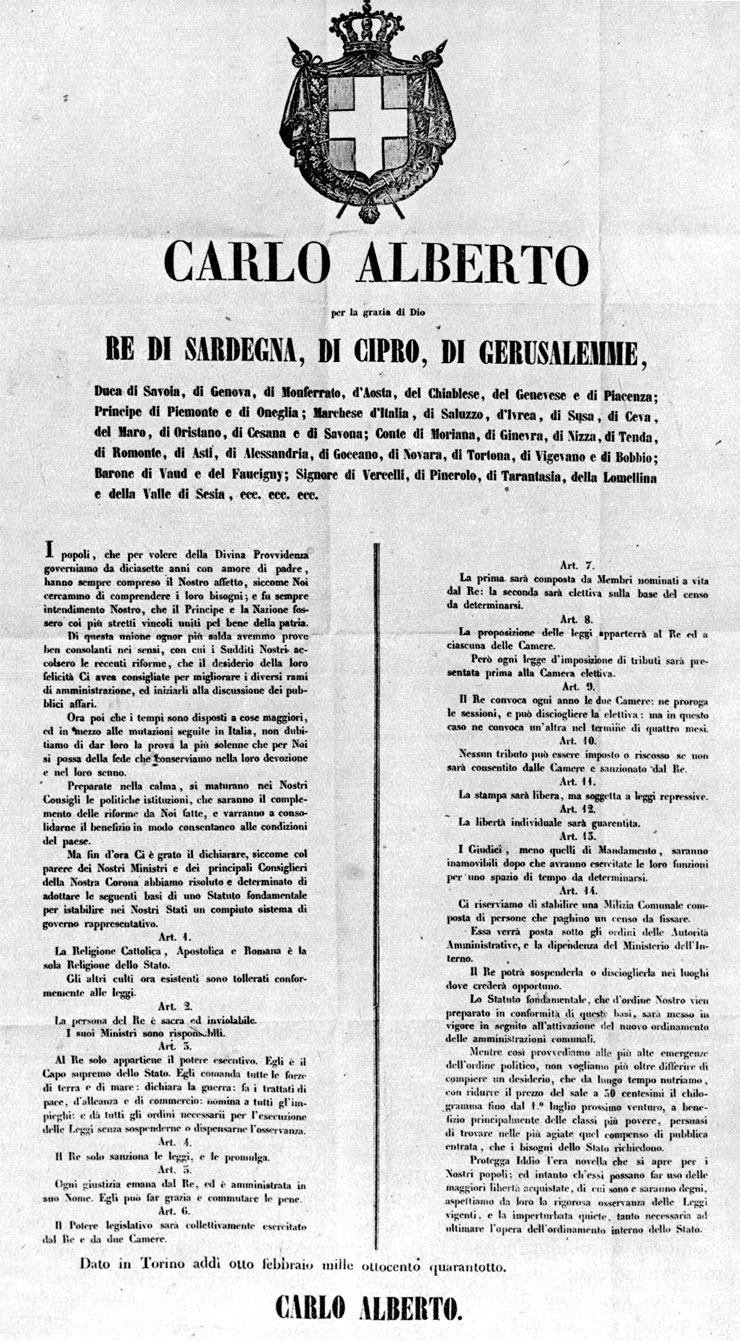
Notice of the proclamation of the Statuto Albertino in 1848 by King Charles Albert of Sardinia

The Kingdom of Italy was a constitutional monarchy. Executive power belonged to the monarch, who governed through appointed ministers. The legislative branch was a bicameral Parliament comprising an appointive Senate and an elective Chamber of Deputies. The kingdom maintained as its constitution the Statuto Albertino, the governing document of the Kingdom of Sardinia. In theory, ministers were responsible solely to the king. However, by this time, a king couldn't appoint a government of his choosing or keep it in office against the express will of Parliament.

Members of the Chamber of Deputies were elected through a plurality voting system in single-member districts. A candidate needed the support of 50% of votes and 25% of all enrolled voters to be elected in the first round of ballots. Seats not adjudicated on the first ballot, were filled through a runoff held shortly after the first ballots. In addition to this, there was a Council of State, which had consultative powers and decided on conflicts of jurisdiction between administrative authorities and courts, as well as on disputes between the state and its creditors. It consisted of a president, three section presidents, 24 councilors of state and the service staff, and was appointed by the king on the proposal of the Council of Ministers.

There was brief experimentation in 1882 with multi-member districts, and after World War I proportional representation was introduced with large, regional, multi-seat electoral constituencies. The Socialists became the major party, but were unable to form a government in a parliament split among the three factions of Socialists, Christian populists, and classical liberals. Elections took place in 1919, 1921 and 1924: on this last occasion, Mussolini abolished proportional representation, replacing it with the Acerbo Law, by which the party that won the largest share of votes got two-thirds of the seats, which gave the Fascist Party an absolute majority of the Chamber seats.

Between 1925 and 1943, Italy was a quasi-de jure fascist dictatorship, as the constitution formally remained in effect without alteration while the monarchy formally accepted Fascist policies and institutions. In 1928 the Grand Council of Fascism took control of government administration, and in 1939 the Chamber of Fasces and Corporations replaced the Chamber of Deputies.

The highest state administration was divided into the following ministries, with their headquarters in Rome:

- Ministry of Foreign Affairs (with the Council for Diplomatic Disputes)
- Ministry of the Interior (with the Supreme Health Council)
- Ministry of Mercy, Justice and Religious Affairs
- Ministry of Finance and Treasury
- Ministry of War (the committees for the General Staff, the Line Arms, the Royal Carabiniers, for Artillery and Engineering, for Military Health and the Supreme War and Naval Tribunal are subordinate to it)
- Ministry of the Navy (with the Supreme Navy Council)
- Ministry of Public Education (with the Higher Education Council)
- Ministry of Public Works (with the Higher Council for Public Works and the Railway Council)
- Ministry of Agriculture, Industry and Trade (with the Mining Council and the Central Statistical Giunta)
- Ministry of Colonies (since 1937 Ministry for Italian Africa)
- Ministry for the Liberated Territories (for the territories occupied and annexed after the First World War)
- Ministry of Transport
- Ministry of Aviation
- Ministry of Education
- Ministry of Post and Telegraph
- Ministry of Labour
- Ministry of Agriculture

Due to the war, a number of other short-lived ministries were created during the First and Second World War.

The Court of Auditors of the Kingdom had an independent status.

== Military ==
- King of Italy – supreme commander of the Italian Royal Army, Navy and later Air Force from 1861 to 1938 and 1943 to 1946
- First Marshal of the Empire – supreme commander of the Italian Royal Army, Air Force, Navy and the Voluntary Militia for National Security from 1938 to 1943 during the Fascist era, held by both Victor Emmanuel III and Benito Mussolini
- Royal Italian Army
- Regia Marina (Royal Italian Navy)
- Regia Aeronautica (Royal Italian Air Force)
- Milizia Volontaria per la Sicurezza Nazionale or "Blackshirts" – a militia loyal to Mussolini during the Fascist era, abolished in 1943.

== Monarchs ==
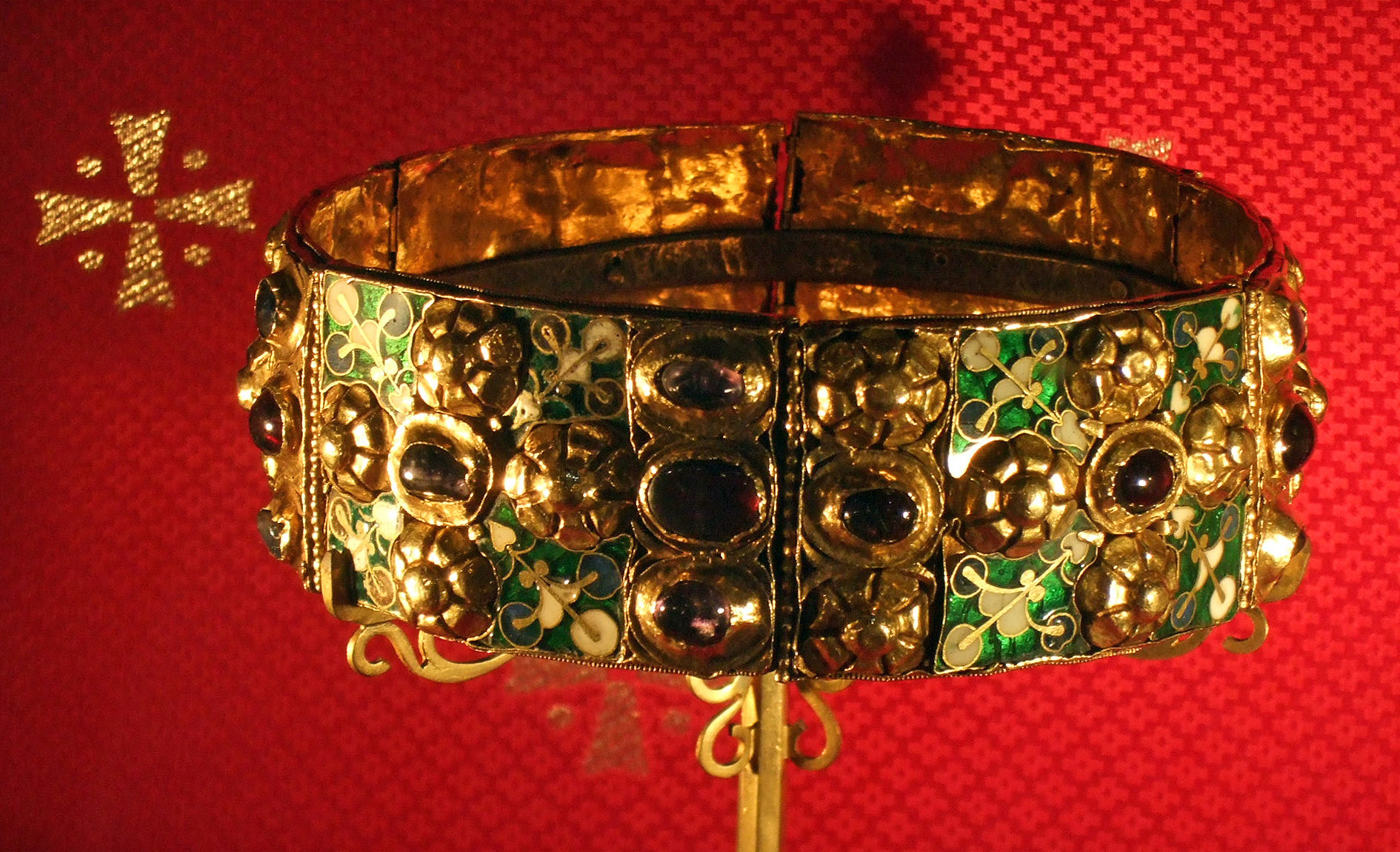
The Iron Crown of Lombardy, for centuries a symbol of the kings of Italy

The King of Italy was formally the holder of state power, but he could only exercise the right of legislation in conjunction with the national parliament, and the government was de facto responsible to parliament. According to the Salic Law, the throne was inherited in the male line of the royal House of Savoy. The king and his house professed allegiance to the Roman Catholic Church. He came of age at the age of 18 and, upon assuming power, took an oath to the constitution in the presence of both chambers. According to the law of 17 March 1861, his title was: "By the grace of God and by the will of the nation, King of Italy and King of Albania (only from 1939 to 1943) and Emperor of Ethiopia (only from 1936 to 1943)". He awarded the five Orders of Knighthood of Savoy and exercised constitutional sovereign rights. He commanded the land, sea and air power; he declared wars, concluded peace, alliance, trade and other treaties, of which only those that entailed a burden on finances or a change in territory required the approval of the chambers to be effective. The king appointed to all state offices, sanctioned and promulgated the laws, which as well as the government acts had to be countersigned by the responsible ministers, and issued the decrees and regulations necessary for the execution of the laws. Justice was administered in his name, and he alone had the pardon and mitigation of punishment.

Monarchs of the Kingdom of Italy
#	Image	Name (Dates)	Period of rule		Monogram	Coats of arms
#	Image	Name (Dates)	Begin	End	Monogram	Coats of arms
1		Victor Emmanuel II; Father of the Fatherland (1820–1878)	17 March 1861	9 January 1878		1861–1870 1870–1878
2		Umberto I the Good (1844–1900)	9 January 1878	29 July 1900		1878–1890 1890–1900
3		Victor Emmanuel III the Soldier King (1869–1947)	29 July 1900	9 May 1946		1900–1929 1929–1944
4		Umberto II the May King (1904–1983)	9 May 1946	12 June 1946		1946

== State symbols ==
The first state coat of arms of the kingdom was adopted from Sardinia-Piedmont. It included the coat of arms of the House of Savoy in the middle and four Italian flags dating from 1848.

On 4 May 1870, by royal decree, two lions in gold, which now carried the shield, a crowned knight's helmet, which bore the Military Order of Savoy, the Order of the Crown of Italy, the Order of Saints Maurice and Lazarus and the Order of the Annunciation around its collar, were added. The motto FERT was deleted. The lions carried lances that held the national flag. From the helmet fell a royal cloak, which was supposed to protect the nation. Above the coat of arms was the star of Italy (Italian Stella d'Italia).

The newly adopted national coat of arms of 1 January 1890 removed the fur coat and the lances and the crown on the helmet was replaced by the Iron Crown of the Lombards. The whole group stood under a canopy, crowned with the Italian royal crown, above which was the banner of Italy. The flagpole was carried by a golden crowned eagle.

On 11 April 1929, Mussolini replaced the two Savoy lions with fasces. Only after his dismissal in 1944 was the old coat of arms from 1890 restored.

== History ==
=== Unification process (1848–1870) ===
Animated map of the Italian unification from 1829 to 1871

Postcards of the 50th anniversary in 1911, depicting the Italia turrita and notable events of the unifaction along with leading figures:Victor Emmanuel II, Camillo Benso, Count of Cavour, Giuseppe Garibaldi and Giuseppe Mazzini

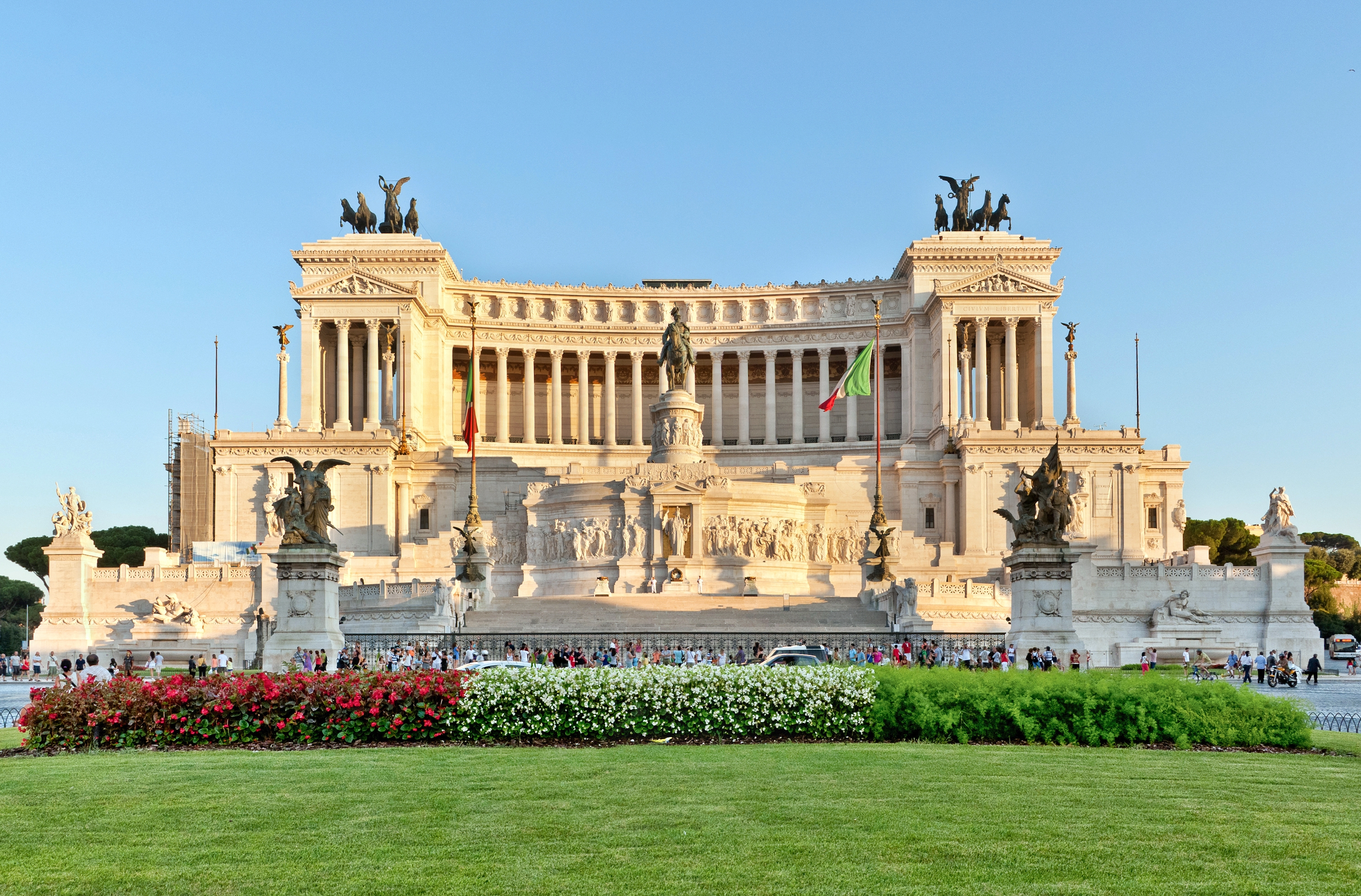
The Altare della Patria in Rome, a national symbol of Italy celebrating King Victor Emmanuel II, and resting place of the Italian Unknown Soldier since the end of World War I. It was inaugurated in 1911, on the occasion of the 50th Anniversary of the Unification of Italy

The birth of the Kingdom of Italy was the result of efforts by Italian nationalists and monarchists loyal to the House of Savoy to establish a united kingdom encompassing the entire Italian Peninsula. Following the Congress of Vienna in 1815, the political and social Italian unification movement, or Risorgimento, emerged to consolidate the different states of the peninsula and liberate it from foreign control. A prominent radical figure was the patriotic journalist Giuseppe Mazzini, member of the secret revolutionary society of Carbonari and founder of the influential political movement Young Italy in the early 1830s. Mazzini favoured a unitary republic and advocated a broad nationalist movement. His prolific output of propaganda helped to spread the unification movement.

The most famous member of Young Italy was the revolutionary and general Giuseppe Garibaldi, renowned for his extremely loyal followers, who led the Italian republican drive for unification in Southern Italy. However, the Northern Italy monarchy of the House of Savoy in the Kingdom of Sardinia, whose government was led by Camillo Benso, Count of Cavour, also had ambitions of establishing a united Italian state. In the context of the 1848 liberal revolutions that swept through Europe, an unsuccessful First Italian War of Independence, led by King Charles Albert of Sardinia, was declared on Austria. In 1855, the Kingdom of Sardinia became an ally of Britain and France in the Crimean War, giving Cavour's diplomacy legitimacy in the eyes of the great powers. The Kingdom of Sardinia again attacked the Austrian Empire in the Second Italian War of Independence of 1859, with the aid of France, resulting in liberating Lombardy. On the basis of the secret Plombières Agreement (21 July 1858), the Kingdom of Sardinia ceded Savoy and Nice to France, an event that caused the Niçard exodus, that was the emigration of a quarter of the Niçard Italians to Italy.

In 1860–1861, Garibaldi led the drive for unification in Naples and Sicily (the Expedition of the Thousand), while the House of Savoy troops occupied the central territories of the Italian peninsula, except Rome and part of Papal States. Teano was the site of the famous meeting of 26 October 1860 between Giuseppe Garibaldi and Victor Emmanuel II, last king of Sardinia, in which Garibaldi shook Victor Emanuel's hand and hailed him as King of Italy; thus, Garibaldi sacrificed republican hopes for the sake of Italian unity under a monarchy. Cavour agreed to include Garibaldi's Southern Italy allowing it to join the union with the Kingdom of Sardinia in 1860. This allowed the Sardinian government to declare a united Italian kingdom on 17 March 1861. Victor Emmanuel II, since March 1849 King of Sardinia, then became the first king of a united Italy, and the capital was moved from Turin to Florence. The title of "King of Italy" had been out of use since the abdication of Napoleon I of France on 6 April 1814.

Following the unification of most of Italy, tensions between the royalists and republicans erupted. In April 1861, Garibaldi entered the Italian parliament and challenged Cavour's leadership, accusing him of dividing Italy, and threatened a civil war between the kingdom in the North and his forces in the South. On 6 June 1861, the kingdom's strongman Cavour died. During the ensuing political instability, Garibaldi and the republicans became increasingly revolutionary in tone. Garibaldi's arrest in 1862 set off worldwide controversy.

In 1866, Otto von Bismarck, Minister President of Prussia, offered Victor Emmanuel II an alliance with the Kingdom of Prussia in the Austro-Prussian War. In exchange, Prussia would allow Italy to annex Austria-controlled Veneto. King Emmanuel agreed to the alliance, and the Third Italian War of Independence began. Italy fared poorly in the war with a badly-organized military against Austria, but Prussia's victory allowed Italy to annex Veneto. At this point, one major obstacle to Italian unity remained: Rome.

In July 1870, Prussia went to war with France, igniting the Franco-Prussian War. To keep the large Prussian Army at bay, France abandoned its positions in Rome – which protected the remnants of the Papal States and Pius IX – to fight the Prussians. Italy benefited from Prussia's victory against France by taking over the Papal States from French authority. The Kingdom of Italy captured Rome after several battles and guerrilla-like warfare by Papal Zouaves and official troops of the Holy See against the Italian invaders. Italy's unification was completed and its capital moved to Rome. Victor Emmanuel, Garibaldi, Cavour, and Mazzini are remembered as Italy's Four Fathers of the Fatherland.

Garibaldi was elected in 1871 in his home city of Nice to the French National Assembly, where he tried to promote the cession of the city from France to the newborn Italian unitary state. He was prevented from speaking, which led the Garibaldini to riots called the "Niçard Vespers". Fifteen of the Nice rebels were tried and sentenced.

Economic conditions in united Italy were poor. The country lacked transportation facilities (see here) and industry, and suffered from extreme poverty (especially in the Mezzogiorno) and high illiteracy. Only a small wealthy elite had the right to vote. The unification movement relied largely on foreign powers' support and continued to do so afterwards. Following the capture of Rome in 1870 from French forces of Napoleon III, Papal troops, and Zouaves, relations between Italy and the Vatican remained sour for the next sixty years, with the Popes declaring themselves to be prisoners in the Vatican. The Catholic Church in Italy frequently protested the anti-clerical actions of the secular Italian governments, refused to meet with envoys from the king, and urged Roman Catholics not to vote in Italian elections. Not until 1929 was the Roman question resolved and positive relations restored between the Kingdom of Italy and the Vatican, after the signing of the Lateran Pacts.

Some of the states that had been targeted for unification (terre irredente), Trentino-Alto Adige and the Julian March, did not join the Kingdom of Italy until 1918 after Italy had defeated Austria-Hungary at the end of the First World War. For this reason, historians sometimes describe the unification period as continuing past 1871, including activities during the late 19th century and the First World War (1915–1918), and reaching completion only with the Armistice of Villa Giusti on 4 November 1918. This more expansive view of the unification is presented at the Central Museum of the Risorgimento.

==== Unifying multiple bureaucracies ====
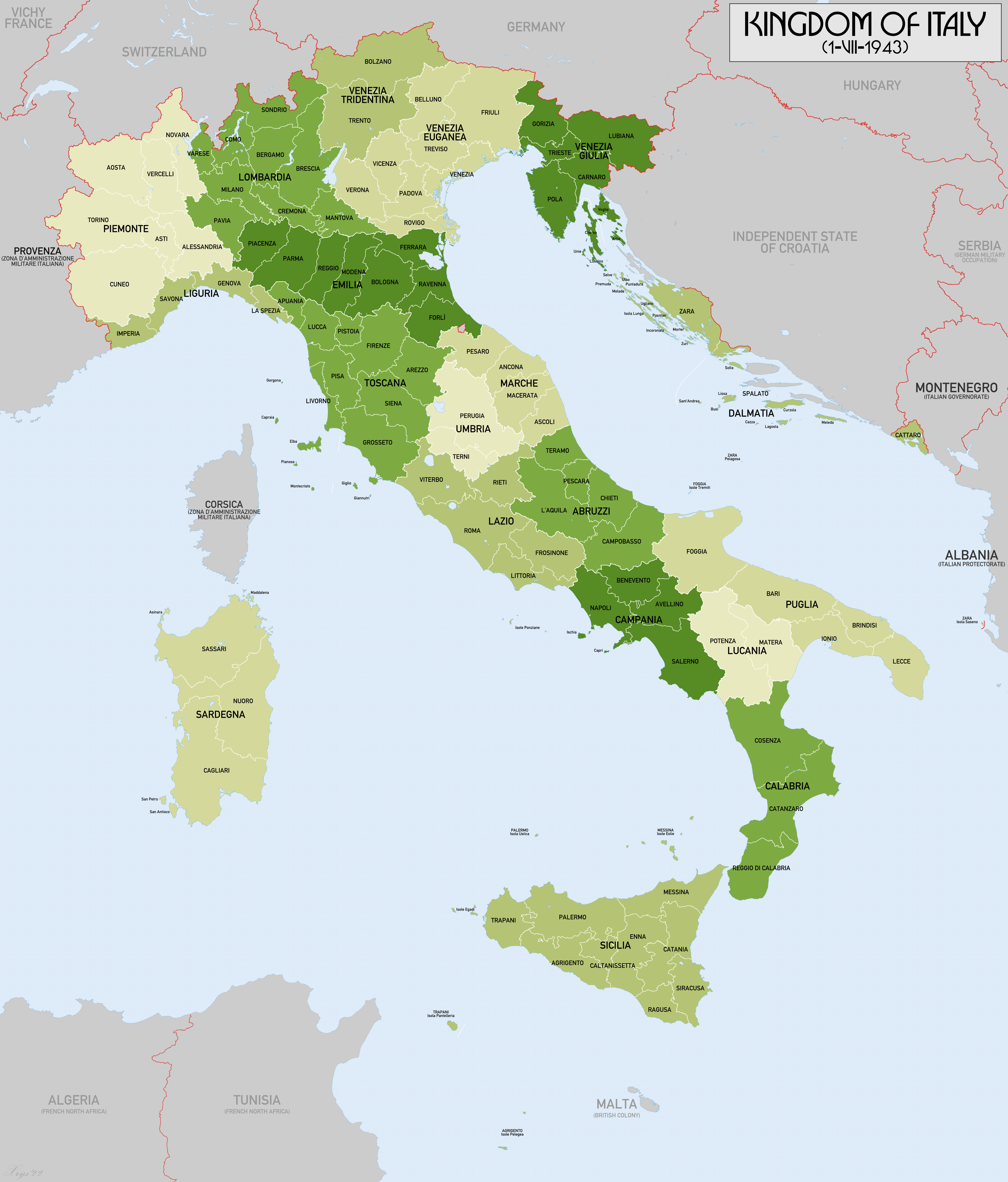
Map of the Kingdom of Italy at its greatest extent in 1943, during World War II, with the annexation of small territories from France and Yugoslavia. The territories annexed by the latter are the area constituting the province of Ljubljana, the area merged with the province of Fiume and the areas making up the Governorate of Dalmatia.

A major challenge for the prime ministers of the new Kingdom of Italy was integrating the political and administrative systems of the seven different major components under a unified set of policies. The different regions were proud of their traditions and could not easily be fitted into the Sardinian model. Cavour started planning for integration, but died (on 6 June 1861) before it was fully developed – indeed, the challenge is thought to have hastened his early death. The regional administrative bureaucracies followed the Napoleonic precedent, so their harmonization was relatively straightforward. The next challenge was to develop a parliamentary legislative system. Cavour and most liberals up and down the peninsula highly admired the British system, which became the model for Italy.

Harmonizing the Navy (Regia Marina) and the Royal Italian Army was much more complex, chiefly because the systems of recruiting soldiers and selecting and promoting officers were so different and grandfathered exceptions to the general system persisted for decades. The disorganization helps explain the dismal performance of the Italian navy in the 1866 war.

Uniformizing the diverse education systems also proved complicated. Shortly before his death, Cavour appointed Francesco De Sanctis as minister of education, an eminent scholar from the University of Naples who proved an able and patient administrator. The addition of Veneto in 1866 and Rome in 1870 further complicated the challenges of bureaucratic coordination.

=== Economy ===
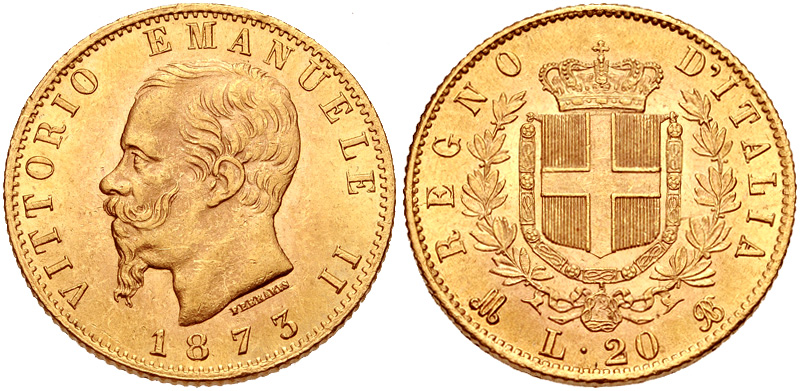
Golden 20 lire coin with the effigy of King Victor Emmanuel II of 1873. Minted in Milan (M BN); other mints included Rome (R) and Turin (T BN).

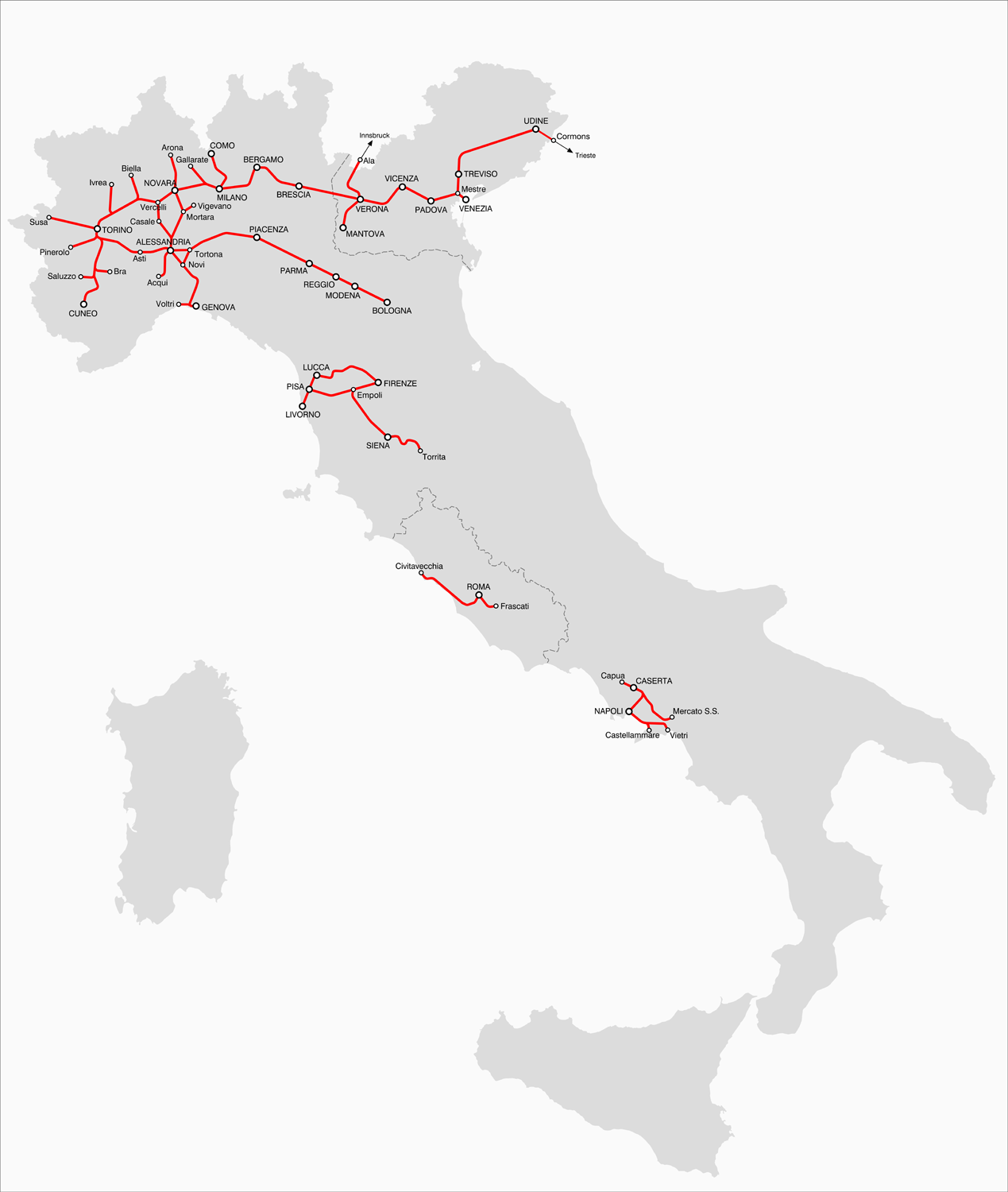
Rail Network as of 17 March 1861

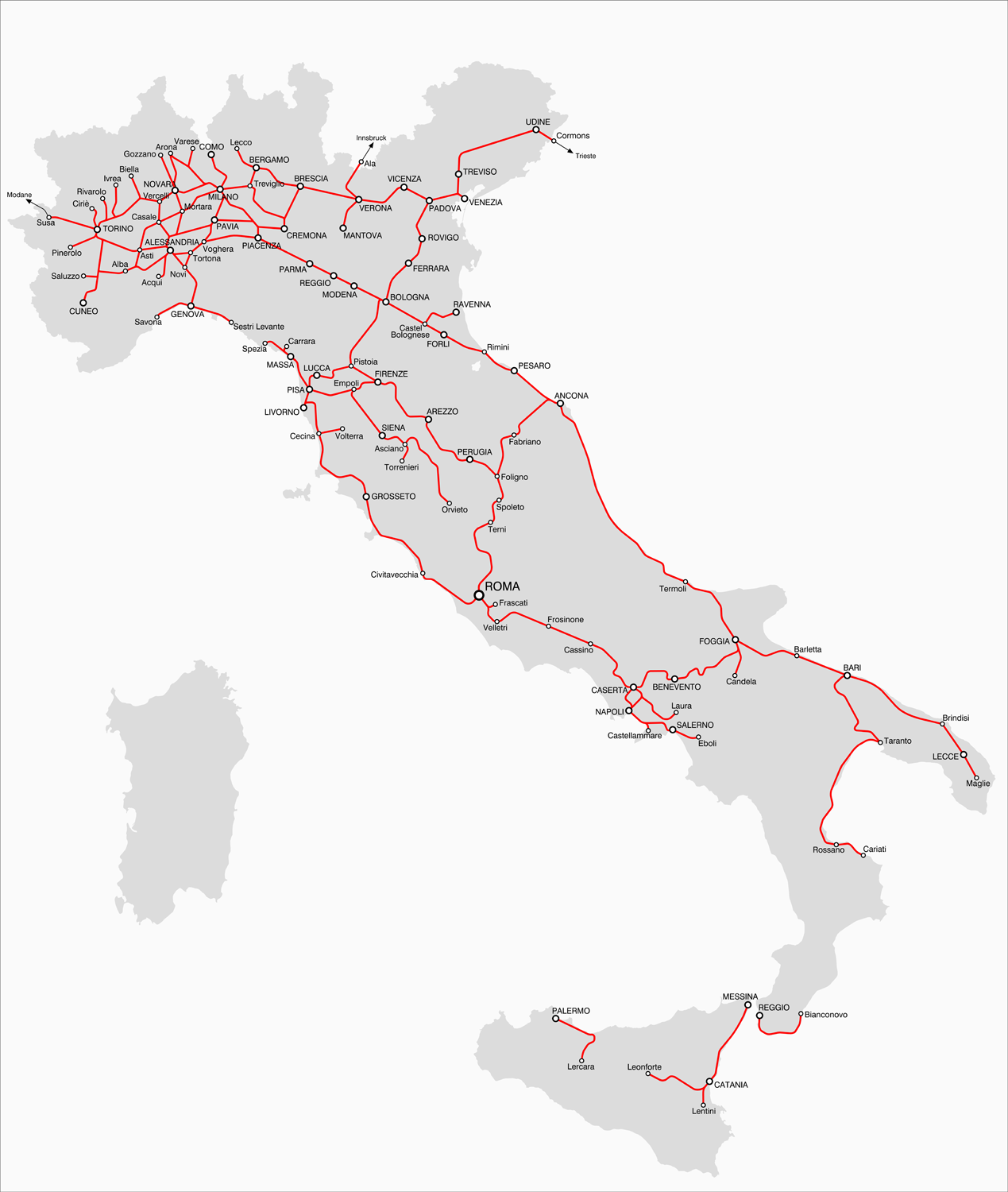
Rail Network as of 20 September 1870

Italy has a long history of different coinage types. Italian unification highlighted the confusion of the pre-unification Italian monetary system which was mostly based on silver monometallism and therefore in contrast with the gold monometallism in force in the Kingdom of Sardinia and in the major European nations. To reconcile the various monetary systems it was decided to opt for bimetallism, taking inspiration from the French franc model, from which the dimensions of the coins and the exchange rate of 1 to 15.50 between gold and silver were taken. The Italian monetary system, however, differed from the French one in two aspects: silver coins could be exchanged in unlimited quantities with the State, but limited quantities between private individuals and it was decided to mint coins that nominally had 900‰ fine silver, but which in fact they contained 835‰ so as to approach the real exchange rate between gold and silver which was approximately 1 to 14.38. Exactly four months after the proclamation of the Kingdom of Italy, the government introduced the new national currency, the Italian lira. The legal tender of the new currency was established by the Royal Decree of 17 July 1861 which specified the exchange of pre-unification coins into lire and the fact that local coins continued to be legal tender in their respective provinces of origin.

In the entire period from 1861 to 1940, Italy experienced considerable economic growth despite several economic crises and the First World War. Unlike most modern nations, where industrialization was undertaken by large corporations, industrial growth in Italy was mostly due to small and medium-sized family businesses.

Political unification did not automatically bring about economic integration, because of the sharp contrasts in culture, politics, and economic practices among the various regions. Italy managed to industrialize in several steps, although the country remained the most backward economy among the great powers (except for the Russian Empire) and was very dependent on foreign trade, especially the international markets through which it imported coal and exported grain.

After unification, Italy had a predominantly agricultural society, with 60 percent of the labor force employed in agriculture. Advances in technology increased export opportunities for Italian agricultural produce after a period of crisis in the 1880s. With industrialization, the proportion employed in agriculture fell below 50% around the transition of the 19th into the 20th century. However, not everyone benefited from these developments, as southern agriculture in particular suffered from the hot arid climate, while in the north malaria hampered cultivation of low-lying areas on the Adriatic coast.

The government's focus on foreign and military policy in the early years of the state led to the neglect of agriculture, which declined after 1873. The Italian parliament initiated an investigation in 1877, which lasted eight years and blamed the lack of mechanization and modern farming techniques, and the failure of landowners to develop their lands. In addition, most farm laborers were temporary inexperienced short-term workers (braccianti). Farmers without a steady income were forced to subsist on meager food. Disease spread rapidly and a major cholera epidemic killed at least 55,000 people. Government action was blocked by strong political and economic opposition from the large landowners. Another commission of inquiry in 1910 found similar problems.

Around 1890 there was also an overproduction crisis in the Italian wine industry, almost the only successful sector in agriculture. In the 1870s and 1880s, viticulture in France suffered from a crop failure caused by insects, and Italy became the largest wine exporter in Europe. After France's recovery in 1888, Italian wine exports collapsed, causing a wave of unemployment and bankruptcies.

From the 1860s, Italy invested heavily in the development of railways, with its rail network more than tripling between 1861 and 1872, then doubling again by 1890. Gio. Ansaldo & C. from the former Kingdom of Sardinia provided the first Italian built locomotives with the FS Class 113 and the later FS Class 650. The first railway section on the island of Sicily was inaugurated on 28 April 1863 with the Palermo–Bagheria line. By 1914 the Italian railway had around 17,000 km of railways.

During the Fascist dictatorship, enormous sums were invested in new technological achievements, especially in military technology. But large sums of money were also spent on prestige projects such as the construction of the new Italian ocean liner SS Rex, which set a transatlantic sea voyage record of four days in 1933, and the development of the seaplane Macchi-Castoldi M.C.72, which was the world's fastest seaplane in 1933. In 1933, Italo Balbo completed a flight across the Atlantic in a seaplane to the World's Fair in Chicago. The flight symbolized the power of the Fascist leadership and the industrial and technological progress the state had made under the Fascists.

Economic measures of the Kingdom of Italy, by year
Measure	1861	1870	1880	1890	1900	1910	1920	1930	1940	1945
GDP in billion US dollars	37.995	41.814	46.690	52.863	60.114	85.285	96.757	119.014	155.424	114.422

=== Industrialization ===
Index of industrialization of the Italian provinces in 1871 (the national average is 1.0). Source: Bank of Italy. Over 1.4 From 1.1 to 1.4 From 0.9 to 1.1 Up to 0.9

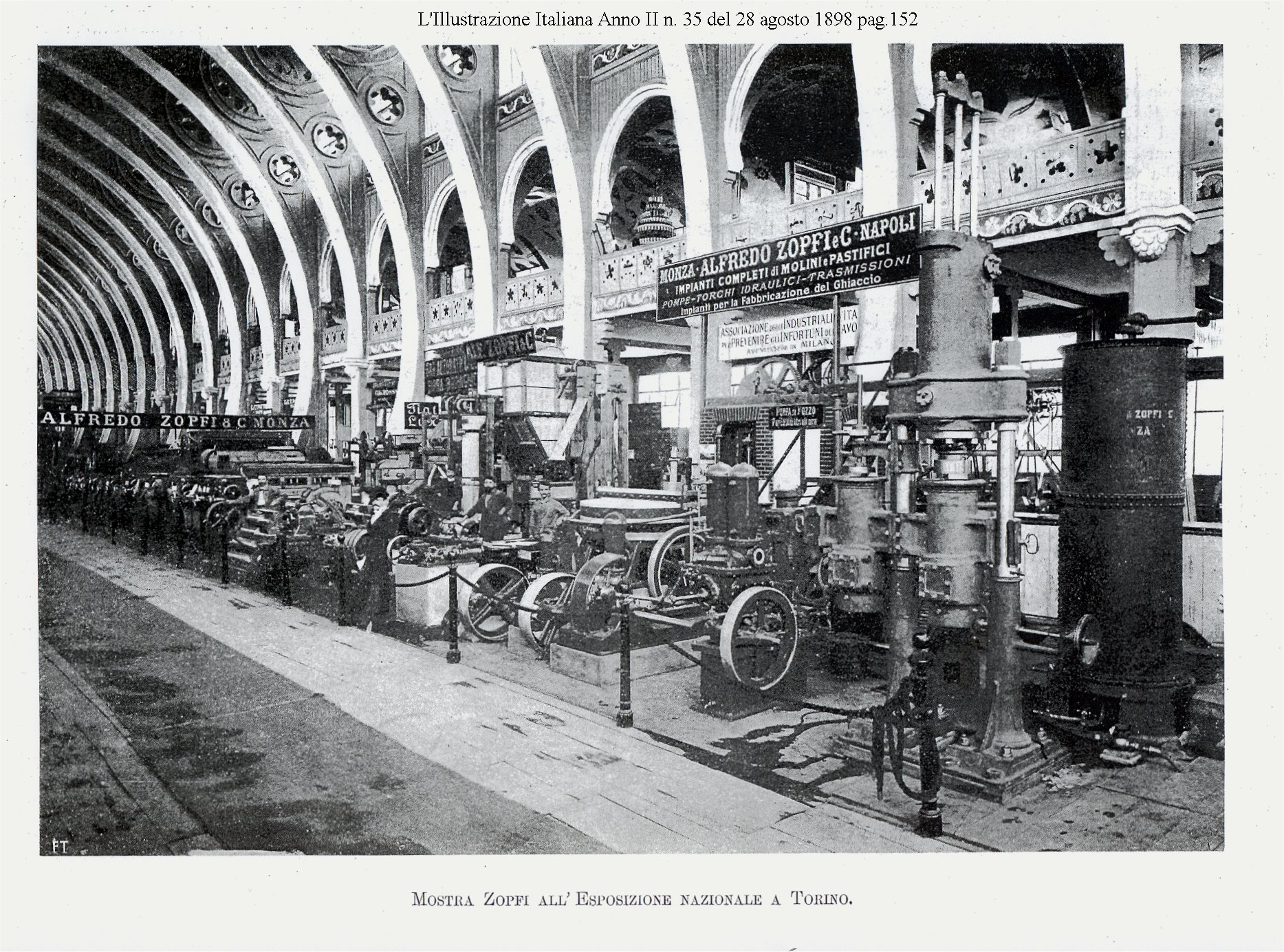
A machinery exposition in Turin, set in 1898, during the period of industrialization, National Exhibition of Turin, 1898

During the 1860s and 1870s, Italian manufacturing was backward and small-scale, while the oversized agrarian sector was the backbone of the national economy. The country lacked large coal and iron deposits. In the 1880s, a severe farm crisis led to the introduction of more modern farming techniques in the Po Valley, while from 1878 to 1887 protectionist policies were introduced with the aim of establishing a base of heavy industry.

In the 1880s industrialisation moved into high gear, which lasted until 1912/13 and reached its peak under Giolitti. Industrial plants soon clustered around areas of hydropower energy. Between 1887 and 1911 hydroelectricity became the main source of energy, with over sixty plants constructed. From 1881 to 1887, Italy's textile, mechanical, steel, iron, and chemical industries grew by an average 4.6 percent annually. The backbone of the industrial boom was, next to the labor force, institutions of higher learning such as the Politecnico founded in Milan in 1863 by Francesco Brioschi and the Technical School for Engineers in Turin established four years earlier.

Steelworks were established with state and private capital, notably from the Credito Mobiliare: in 1884 in Terni and in 1897 in Piombino using iron-ore from Elba. The relative backwardness of the south continued to be a central problem for the state. Various solutions were proposed for the so-called "Southern question" by Francesco Saverio Nitti, Gaetano Salvemini and Sidney Sonnino, but the government only acted in special problem areas such as Naples. The ILVA group of Genoa, with the political and financial backing of the Italian state, built the Bagnoli steel plant as part of the 1904 law for the development of Naples, prepared by economist and later prime minister Nitti. In 1898, in order to make the steel-industry completely independent from foreign coal imports, the Neapolitan engineer Ernesto Stassano invented the Stassano furnace, the first indirect-arc electric furnace. By 1917, Italian iron and steel plants operated 88 indirect-arc furnaces, manufactured by Stassano, Bassanese and Angelini.

In 1899 the automobile industry commenced when Giovanni Agnelli bought the designs and patents of the Ceirano brothers and founded the Fiat automobile works. In 1906 another automobile factory was built in the Portello district of Milan for the French entrepreneur Alexandre Darracq and the headquarters of his Italian branch Società Anonima Italiana Darracq. In 1910, the company brought the first successful model onto the market with the 24 HP and the brand name ALFA on the radiator grille. While automobiles were only affordable by few its popularity and fascination rose rapidly, and one of the first sports car racing events in the world, the Targa Florio, held annually in the mountains of Sicily was established in 1906.

In the financial sector, Prime Minister Giolitti was mainly concerned with increasing pensions and restructuring the state budget, though proceeding with great caution. The government secured the support of large companies and banks. Most criticism the project came from conservatives, with a majority of the public supporting the soundness of public finances. The state budget, which from 1900 had an annual income of around 50 million lire, was to be additionally strengthened by the nationalization of the railways.

In March 1905, after serious labor unrest among railroad workers, Giolitti resigned due to illness, and suggested his fellow party member Alessandro Fortis to the king as his successor. On 28 March Victor Emmanuel III appointed Fortis as the new prime minister, making him the first Jewish head of government worldwide. With Law 137 of 22 April 1905 he sanctioned the nationalization of the railways through a public recruitment process under the control of the Court of Audit and the supervision of the Ministries of Public Works and Finance. At the same time, the telephone system was nationalized. The Fortis government remained in office until the beginning of 1906. It was followed from 8 February to 29 May by a brief government under Sidney Sonnino. Finally, Giolitti entered his third term. In this he dealt mainly with the economic situation in southern Italy, due both to long-term demographic and economic factors, as well as natural disasters such as the eruption of Vesuvius in 1906 and the earthquake in Messina, Calabria, and Palmi in 1908. Entire villages were depopulated and centuries-old regional cultures disappeared. Nevertheless, there was a slight economic upswing in the south afterwards. The government, which had initially discouraged emigration to avoid labor shortages, now gave its approval to the emigration of hundreds of thousands of Italians from the south. This was motivated by fear of increasing social tensions and monetary instability.

In 1906 the government lowered the national interest tax rate from 5% to 3.75%. This move eased the burden on the state's required finances, reduced the fears of state bondholders, and encouraged the growth of heavy industry. The subsequent budget surplus made it possible to finance major government work projects which massively reduced unemployment, such as the completion of the Simplon Tunnel in 1906. Shortly after the railway began its triumphal march through Switzerland, each region wanted its own north–south connection and with the construction of the railway tunnels on the Gotthard 14,998 km (1872–1880), Simplon 19,803 km (1898–1906) and Lötschberg 14,612 km (1907–1913), three major Alpine crossings were realized that were important for Switzerland and neighboring European countries. The workforce of these monumental projects were largely Italians: at the Gotthard tunnel 90% of miners came from northern Italy, while at the Lötschberg tunnel 97% were Italian, chiefly from the south.

In addition to the now completed nationalization of the railways, the planned nationalization of insurance was tackled and the trade war with France, which had lasted since 1887, ended. Giolitti thereby interrupted Crispi's pro-German foreign policy and thus enabled the export of fruit, vegetables and wine to France. He also boosted the cultivation of sugar beets and their processing in the Po Valley and encouraged heavy industry to gain a foothold in the south as well. However, the latter was not very successful. In 1908, some laws limiting working hours for women and children up to 12 hours were passed with the support of the Socialist MPs. Special laws for the disadvantaged regions of the south followed. However, their implementation mostly failed due to the resistance of the large landowners. Nevertheless, there was a significant improvement in the economic situation of smallholders.

In 1911, 55.4% of the Italian population worked in agriculture and 26.9% in industry.

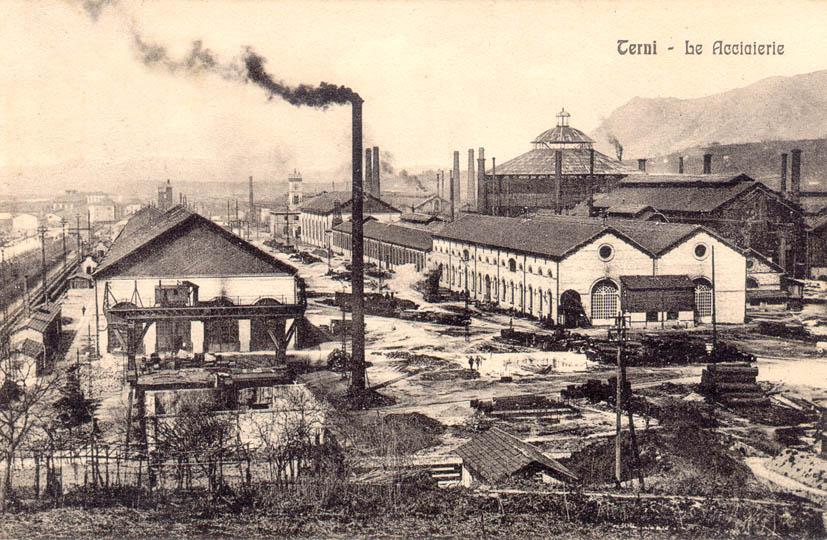
The Terni steel plant est. 1884 (picture of 1912)

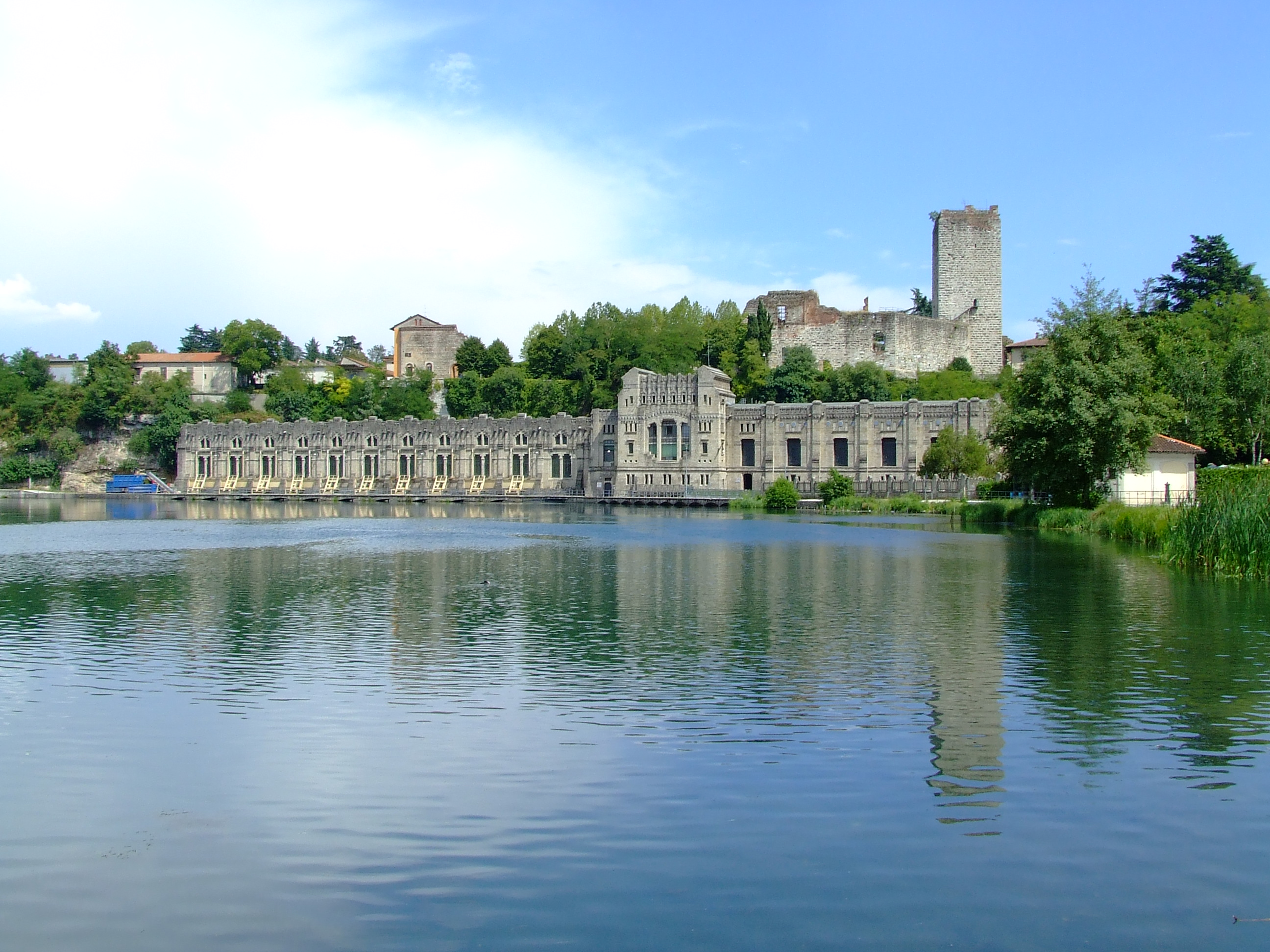
Hydroelectric plant on the Adda river built in 1906

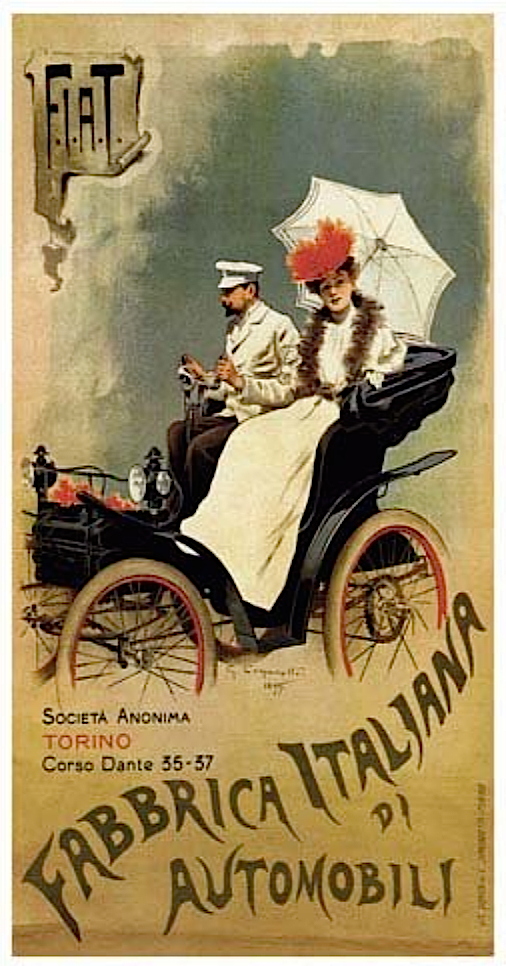
An advertisement for the 4HP automobile by FIAT in 1899

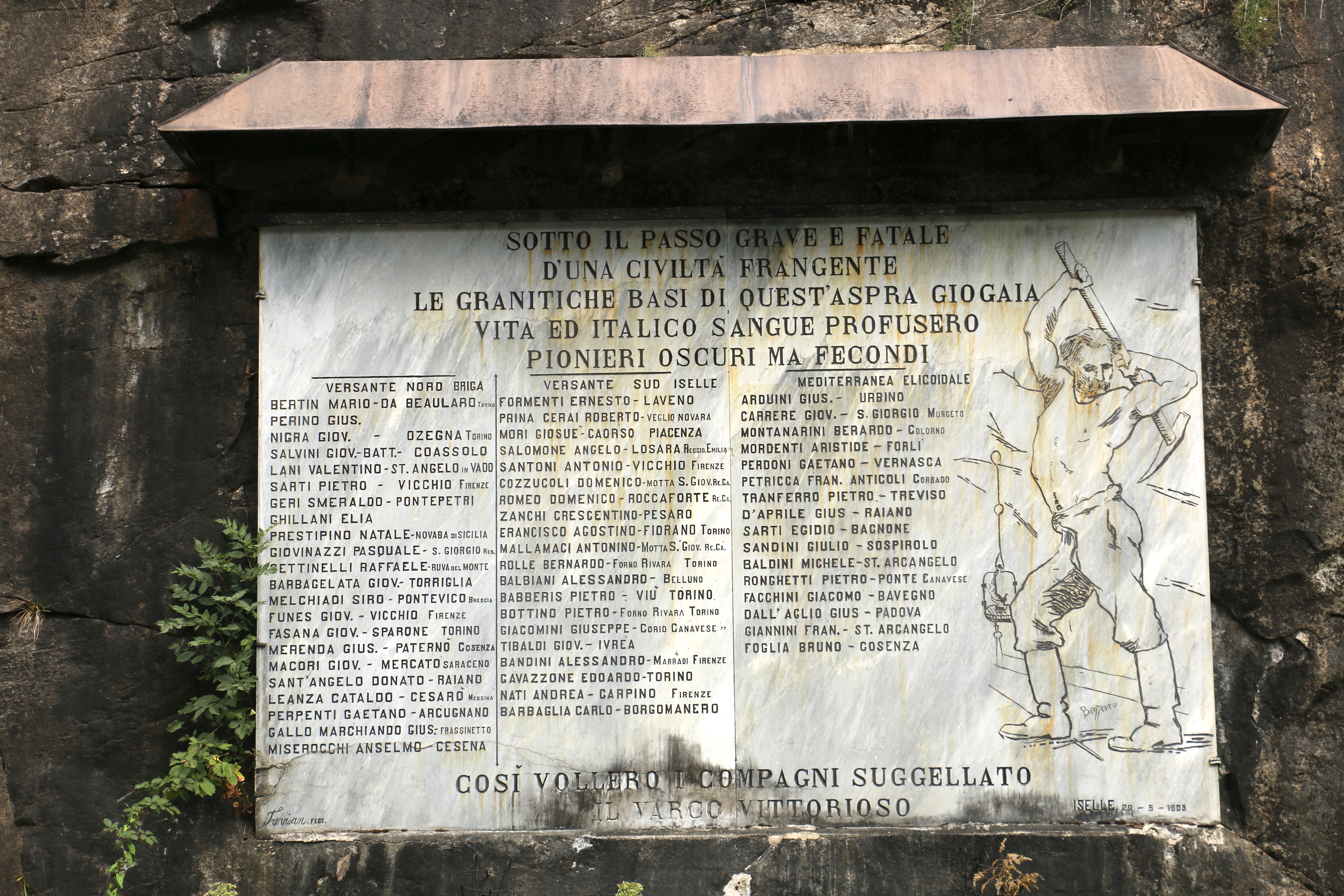
Monument in memory of the workers that died mining the Simplon Tunnel, next to the Iselle di Trasquera railway station, dated 29 May 1905

=== Social changes and mass emigration ===
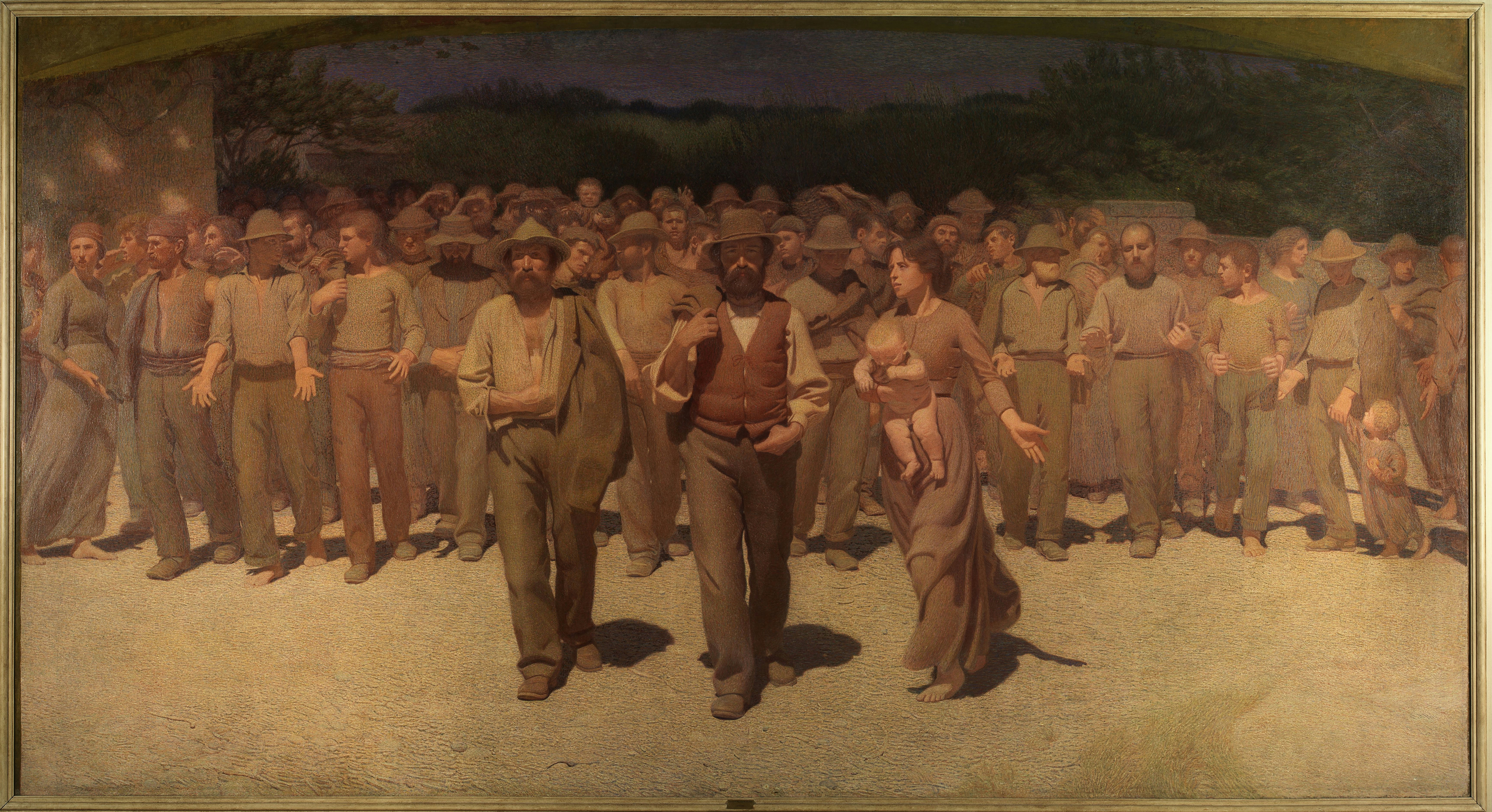
The Fourth Estate by Giuseppe Pellizza, c. 1898–1901

Strong social tensions came to light, Italy's social legislation took last place in Europe, the socialists were opposed not only to social policy but also to colonial expansion. Prime Minister Francesco Crispi financed the colonial policy with tax increases and austerity measures. The internal political differences culminated in the Bava Beccaris massacre in Milan. There, on 7 May 1898, there were mass demonstrations against rising bread prices. General Fiorenzo Bava-Beccaris, after the state of siege was declared, fired artillery and rifles at the crowd. Depending on the information, between 82 and 300 people were killed. King Umberto I congratulated the general in a telegram and awarded him a medal. This made him enemies, and in 1900 he, who had been king for 22 years, was shot in Monza by the anarchist Gaetano Bresci.

His successor was Victor Emmanuel III politically dominant however was Giolitti, who was initially Minister of the Interior from 1901 to 1903, then prime minister from 1903 with interruptions until 1914 (and often also Minister of the Interior at the same time). He dominated or shaped Italian politics to such an extent that one speaks of the Giolitti era. He was willing to make concessions to the reformist and revolutionary movements and promoted industrialization. It is true that state subsidies for private health insurance were introduced in 1886 and the first compulsory accident insurance was introduced in 1898, but it was Giolitti that introduced state social insurance in 1912 based on the German model. He also reformed the right to vote so that there were no more property limits and the number of eligible voters rose to 8 million men. Unemployment insurance came into being as early as 1919, eight years before Germany.

In the 1880s there were serious industrial disputes, and around 1889 repression against the Partito Operaio (Labour Party) began, so that the aim was to unite all socialist organizations in the country in one party. The Fasci Siciliani, short for "Fasci siciliani dei lavoratori", Italian Sicilian Workers' Union was perceived as the "first act of Italian socialism". This popular movement of democratic and socialist inspiration that arose in Sicily in the years between 1892 and 1893, was crushed after harsh military operations in 1894. The industrial workers managed to organize in 1892 in the Partito dei Lavoratori Italiani (Italian Workers' Party), which in 1893 was renamed Partito Socialista Italiano (Italian Socialist Party). Prime Minister Francesco Crispi pushed through exceptional laws against the Socialists from 1894, but they were ultimately unsuccessful. In 1901 his successor Giovanni Giolitti tried to integrate the party, which had won 32 seats in the elections, into the government, but the latter refused. But from 1908 to 1912 there was cooperation with the bourgeois left until radical syndicalism prevailed. In 1912 the Partito Socialista Riformista Italiano split off, which for patriotic reasons agreed to the War against the Ottomans. In 1917, the majority of socialist deputies became pro-war, but the party leadership continued to oppose the war.

Population development of the Kingdom of Italy, by year (1861–1946)
Measure	1861	1870	1880	1890	1900	1910	1920	1930	1940	1946
Population in millions	22.182	25.766	28.437	30.947	32.475	34.565	37.837	40.703	43.787	45.380

The state reaction to the drastic social changes came very late, because the social elites, landowners in the south and industrialists in the north, refused for a long time and often relied on the work of the church, which had dominated the social systems since the Middle Ages. However, it was no longer supported by an adequate municipal or guild system. The population of Italy increased from 18.3 million in 1800 to 24.7 in 1850, finally to 33.8 in 1900. Nevertheless, Italy's share of the population of Europe continued to fall. On the one hand, this was due to its developmental deficit and, on the other hand, to the fact that from about 1852 there was a large-scale mass emigration. By 1985, around 29 million people had been recorded. From 1876 to around 1890, most came from the north, especially from Venetia (17.9%), Friuli-Venezia Giulia (16.1%) and Piedmont (12.5%). After that, Italians from the south increasingly emigrated. From 1876 to 1915, more than 14 million people emigrated chiefly for south and north America, of which 8.3 million came from the northern half, including 2.7 million alone from the northeast and from the southern half 5.6 million emigrated. The main destinations were the United States of America, in which the descendants of the Italians (Italian Americans) today represent the third largest European immigrant group after Germans and Irish with a population share of 6%, along with Argentina (Italian Argentines), Brazil (Italian Brazilians) and Uruguay (Italian Uruguayans). Many also emigrated to Canada, Australia and other Latin American countries.

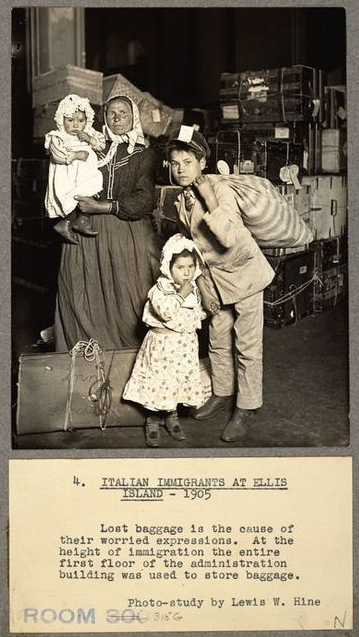
Italian immigrants arriving at Ellis Island in 1905

The main reason for emigration was widespread poverty, especially among the rural population. Up until the 1950s, parts of Italy remained a rural, agrarian, and pre-modern society, with agricultural conditions not suitable for keeping farmers in the country, particularly in the northeast and south. The extent of emigration can be explained on the one hand by the decline of agriculture and the sharp conflicts, which were exacerbated by the preservation of old structures and the lack of capital as well as by large landowners and half-tenancy. At the same time, the hesitant industrialization in the fast-growing cities hardly offered enough jobs. In addition, domestic consumption was low, especially since the fiscalism that was believed to be necessary to expand infrastructure continued to weigh on incomes. After all, the companies were equipped with only little capital compared to the foreign ones. Therefore, the government set up high tariff barriers from 1878 to 1887 and pursued a protectionist policy intended to protect the still weak textile and heavy industry in the development phase. France in turn responded to the protective tariff policy with corresponding counter-tariffs.

While industrialization was promoted and infrastructure expanded in the north, the government in the south supported the latifundia, whereby in both cases the protagonists of heavy industry and agriculture were able to assert their influence in the north and south. In central Italy there was a different system for the peasants. Land could be leased here and they could keep a relatively large amount, so there was less migration from this part of the country than from other parts. There was less migration from large cities, but there was a major exception to this. Naples was the capital of the Kingdom of Naples and later of the Kingdom of the Two Sicilies for six hundred years and in 1861 became simply a city in the united Italy. As a result, many bureaucratic jobs were lost and there was a lot of unemployment. Due to a cholera epidemic in the 1880s, many people also decided to leave the city. In the south the unification abolished the feudal system that had survived since the middle ages. However, this did not mean that the farmers now got their own land that they could work on. Many remained without property and plots became smaller and smaller and thus more unproductive after lands were divided among heirs. Another reason was the overpopulation, especially in the south (Mezzogiorno). After unification southern Italy established access to running water and medical care in hospitals for the first time. This reduced infant mortality and, together with what had been the highest birth rate in Europe for a long time, led to an increase in population, which in turn forced many young southern Italians to emigrate at the beginning of the 20th century.

Currency policy caused major problems, because during the Franco-Prussian War Italy also suspended free convertibility. Now the gold standard prevailed, which ensured that banknotes could only be issued in a fixed proportion to the gold reserves. It was expected that this would stabilize currency relations through the gold automatism, whereby the respective central banks had to adhere to strict rules. If a currency became weaker, this led to a gold outflow in the direction of the stronger currency, with the result that the banknote issue had to be reduced in line with the reduced gold reserves. This raised interest rates and lowered prices. In contrast, in the country where gold was flocking, this created more paper money in circulation, lowering interest rates and raising prices. At a certain point, the flow of gold reversed, the balance of payments settled, and the currency stabilized. Even if the central banks often did not comply with the guidelines, the system was successful because people trusted that money and gold could be exchanged at any time. By linking the Latin Monetary Union, founded in 1865 and based on bimetallism, i.e. gold and silver coins, and thus the lira to gold, the government was able to create so much trust that foreign investment capital after Italy came. Treasury Secretary Sidney Sonnino also tried to put a strain on large fortunes in the same way as consumption was put under pressure, but he failed due to conservative opposition. With the overcoming of the economic crisis from 1896, it was nevertheless possible to achieve a balanced budget.

Italian emigration per region from 1876 to 1900 and from 1901 to 1915

Map of the Italian diaspora in the world

==== Southern question and Italian diaspora ====
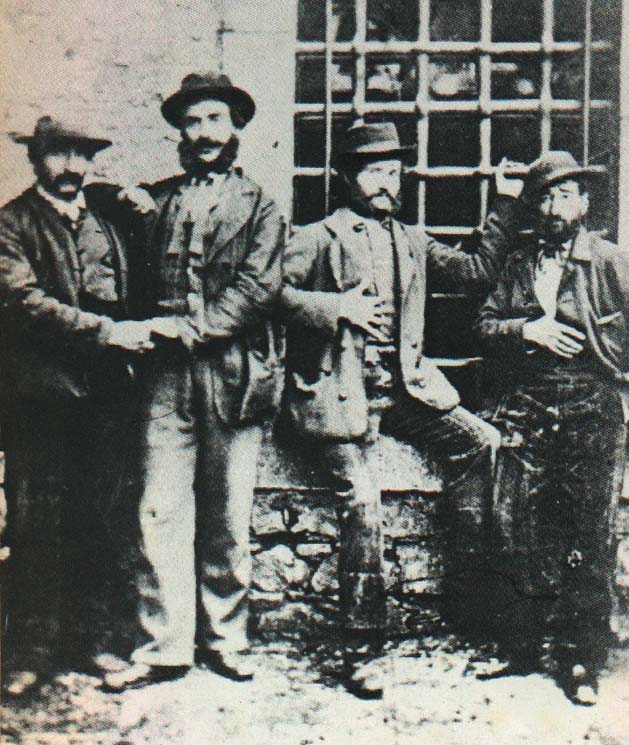
Some Lucanian brigands: Caruso, Cafo, Lamacchia and Tinna

Italy's population remained severely divided between wealthy elites and impoverished workers, especially in the South. An 1881 census found that over 1 million southern day-laborers were chronically under-employed and likely to become seasonal emigrants to sustain themselves economically. Southern peasants, as well as small landowners and tenants, often were in a state of conflict and revolt throughout the late 19th century. There were exceptions to the generally poor economic condition of agricultural workers of the South, as some regions near cities such as Naples and Palermo as well as along the Tyrrhenian Sea coast. From the 1870s onward, intellectuals, scholars and politicians examined the economic and social conditions of southern Italy (Il Mezzogiorno), a movement known as Meridionalismo ("Meridionalism"). For example, the 1910 Commission of Inquiry into the South indicated that the Italian government thus far had failed to ameliorate the severe economic differences. The limited voting rights only to those with sufficient property allowed rich landowners to exploit the poor. This situation of persistent backwardness in the socioeconomic development of the regions of southern Italy compared to the other regions of the country, especially the northern ones, is called Southern question.

The transition from a peninsula divided into several states to a unified Italy was not smooth for the south (the Mezzogiorno). The path to unification and modernization created a divide between Northern and Southern Italy. People condemned the South for being "backwards" and barbaric, when in truth, compared to Northern Italy, "where there was backwardness, the lag, never excessive, was always more or less compensated by other elements". The entire region south of Naples was afflicted with numerous deep economic and social liabilities. However, many of the South's political problems and its reputation of being "passive" or lazy (politically speaking) was due to the new government (that was born out of Italy's want for development) that alienated the South and prevented the people of the South from any say in important matters. However, on the other hand, transportation was difficult, soil fertility was low with extensive erosion, deforestation was severe, many businesses could stay open only because of high protective tariffs, large estates were often poorly managed, most peasants had only very small plots, and there was chronic unemployment and high crime rates.

Cavour decided the basic problem was poor government, and believed that could be remedied by strict application of the Piedmonese legal system. The main result was an upsurge in brigandage, which turned into a bloody civil war that lasted almost ten years. The insurrection reached its peak mainly in Basilicata and northern Apulia, headed by the brigands Carmine Crocco and Michele Caruso. With the end of the southern riots, there was a heavy outflow of millions of peasants in the Italian diaspora, especially to the United States and South America. Others relocated to the northern industrial cities such as Genoa, Milan and Turin, and sent money home.

The first Italian diaspora began around 1880, two decades after the Unification of Italy, and ended in the 1920s to the early 1940s with the rise of Fascist Italy. Poverty was the main reason for emigration, specifically the lack of land as mezzadria sharecropping flourished in Italy, especially in the South, and property became subdivided over generations. Especially in Southern Italy, conditions were harsh. Until the 1860s to 1950s, most of Italy was a rural society with many small towns and cities and almost no modern industry in which land management practices, especially in the South and the northeast, did not easily convince farmers to stay on the land and to work the soil.

Another factor was related to the overpopulation of Southern Italy as a result of the improvements in socioeconomic conditions after Unification. That created a demographic boom and forced the new generations to emigrate en masse in the late 19th century and the early 20th century, mostly to the Americas. The new migration of capital created millions of unskilled jobs around the world and was responsible for the simultaneous mass migration of Italians searching for "work and bread" (Italian: pane e lavoro, Italian: [ˈpaːne e llaˈvoːro]).

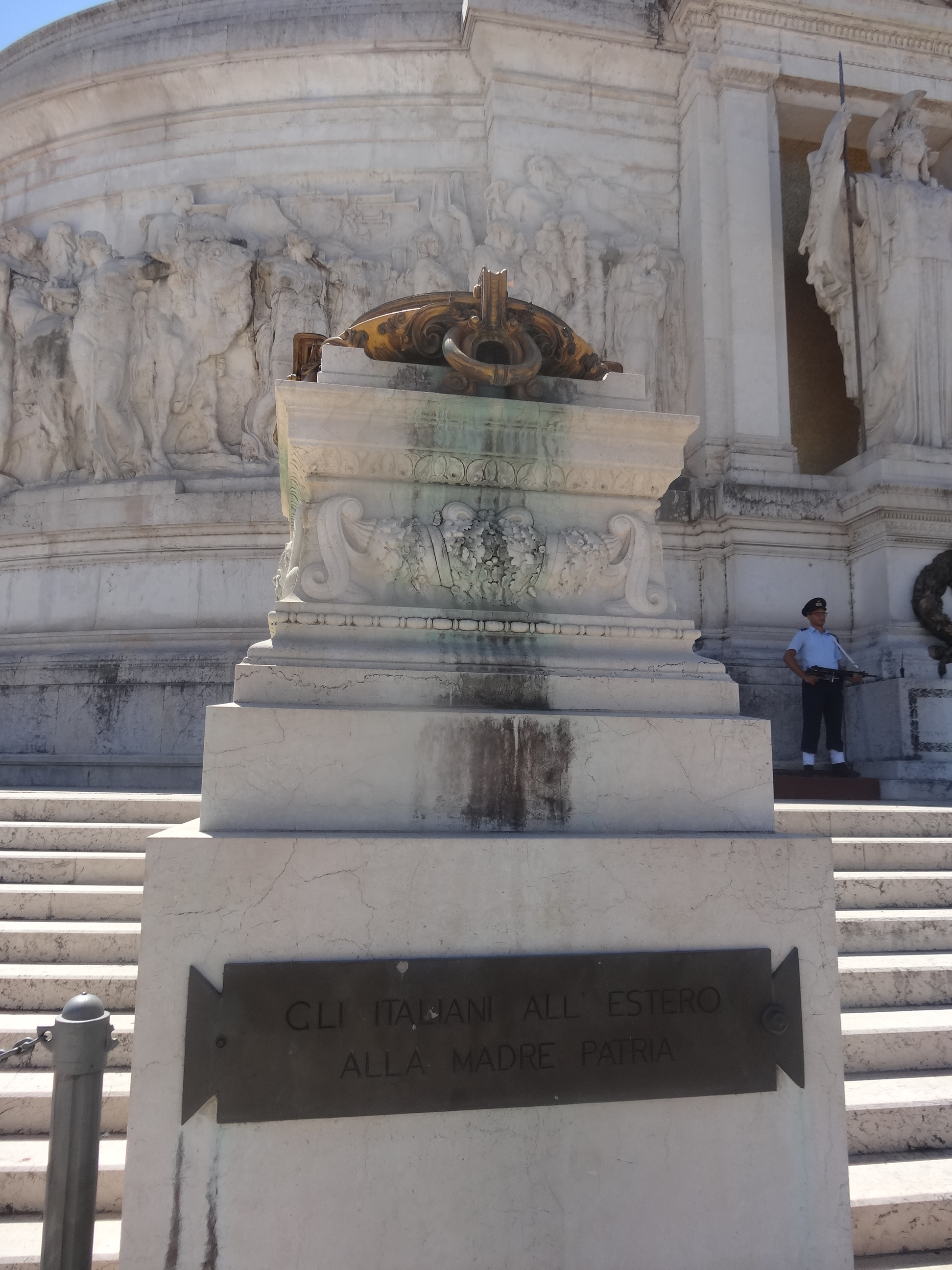
One of the two braziers that burn perpetually on the sides of the tomb of the Italian Unknown Soldier at Altare della Patria in Rome. At their base there is a plaque bearing the inscription Gli italiani all'estero alla Madre Patria ("Italians abroad to the Motherland").

The Unification of Italy broke down the feudal land system, which had survived in the south since the Middle Ages, especially where land had been the inalienable property of aristocrats, religious bodies or the king. The breakdown of feudalism, however, and redistribution of land did not necessarily lead to small farmers in the south winding up with land of their own or land they could work and make profit from. Many remained landless, and plots grew smaller and smaller and so less and less productive, as land was subdivided amongst heirs.

Between 1860 and World War I, 9 million Italians left permanently of a total of 16 million who emigrated, most travelling to North or South America. The numbers may have even been higher; 14 million from 1876 to 1914, according to another study. Annual emigration averaged almost 220,000 in the period 1876 to 1900, and almost 650,000 from 1901 through 1915. Prior to 1900 the majority of Italian immigrants were from northern and central Italy. Two-thirds of the migrants who left Italy between 1870 and 1914 were men with traditional skills. Peasants were half of all migrants before 1896.

The bond of the emigrants with their mother country continued to be very strong even after their departure. Many Italian emigrants made donations to the construction of the Altare della Patria (1885–1935), a part of the monument dedicated to King Victor Emmanuel II of Italy, and in memory of that, the inscription of the plaque on the two burning braziers perpetually at the Altare della Patria next to the tomb of the Italian Unknown Soldier, reads Gli italiani all'estero alla Madre Patria ("Italians abroad to the Motherland"). The allegorical meaning of the flames that burn perpetually is linked to their symbolism, which is centuries old, since it has its origins in classical antiquity, especially in the cult of the dead. A fire that burns eternally symbolizes that the memory, in this case of the sacrifice of the Unknown Soldier and the bond of the country of origin, is perpetually alive in Italians, even in those who are far from their country, and will never fade.

=== Education ===
Literacy rates in Italy in 1861, shortly after the proclamation of the Kingdom of Italy. Italy lacks Lazio and the Triveneto, which were subsequently annexed.

In Italy a state school system or education system has existed since 1859, when the Legge Casati (Casati Act) mandated educational responsibilities for the forthcoming Italian state (Italian unification took place in 1861).

The Casati Act made primary education (scuola elementare) compulsory, and had the goal of increasing literacy. This law gave control of primary education to the single towns, of secondary education to the provinces, and the universities were managed by the State. Even with the Casati Act and compulsory education, in rural (and southern) areas children often were not sent to school (the rate of children enrolled in primary education would reach 90% only after 70 years) and the illiteracy rate (which was nearly 80% in 1861) took more than 50 years to halve.

The next important law concerning the Italian education system was the Legge Gentile. This act was issued in 1923, thus when Benito Mussolini and his National Fascist Party were in power. In fact, Giovanni Gentile was appointed the task of creating an education system deemed fit for the fascist system. The compulsory age of education was raised to 14 years, and was somewhat based on a ladder system: after the first five years of primary education, one could choose the scuola media, which would give further access to the liceo and other secondary education, or the 'avviamento al lavoro' (work training), which was intended to give a quick entry into the low strates of the workforce. The reform enhanced the role of the Liceo Classico, created by the Casati Act in 1859 (and intended during the Fascist era as the peak of secondary education, with the goal of forming the future upper classes), and created the Technical, Commercial and Industrial institutes and the Liceo Scientifico. The influence of Gentile's Italian idealism was great, and he considered the Catholic religion to be the "foundation and crowning" of education.

=== Liberal era of politics (1870–1914) ===
After unification, Italy's politics favored liberalism: (Note: In 1848, Camillo Benso, Count of Cavour had formed a parliamentary group in the Kingdom of Sardinia Parliament named the Partito Liberale Italiano (Italian Liberal Party). From 1860, with the Unification of Italy substantially realized and the death of Cavour himself in 1861, the Liberal Party was split into at least two major factions or new parties later known as the Destra Storica on the right wing, who substantially assembled the Count of Cavour's followers and political heirs; and the Sinistra Storica on the left wing, who mostly reunited the followers and sympathizers of Giuseppe Garibaldi and other former Mazzinians. The Historical Right (Destra Storica) and the Historical Left (Sinistra Storica) were composed of royalist liberals. At the same time, radicals organized themselves into the Radical Party and republicans into the Italian Republican Party.) the liberal-conservative right (destra storica or Historical Right) was regionally fragmented (Note: The liberal-conservative Historical Right was dominated from 1860 to 1876 (also after it was no more at the govern) by the leadership of elected Representatives from Emilia-Romagna (1860–1864) and Tuscany (1864–1876), known as the Consorteria, with the support of the Lombard and Southern Italian representatives. The majority of the Piemontese liberal-conservative representatives, but not all of them, organized themselves as the all-Piemontese and more right-wing party's minority: the Associazione Liberale Permanente (Permanent Liberal Association), who sometimes voted with the Historical Left and whose leading representative was Quintino Sella. The party's majority was also weakened by the substantial differences between the effective liberal-conservative (Toscano and Emiliano) leadership and Lombards on one side and the quietly conservative Southern and "Transigent Roman Catholic" components on the other side. (Indro Montanelli, Storia d'Italia, volume 32).) and liberal-conservative prime minister Marco Minghetti only held on to power by enacting revolutionary and left-leaning policies (such as the nationalization of railways) to appease the opposition.

==== Agostino Depretis ====
In 1876, Minghetti was ousted and replaced by liberal Agostino Depretis, who began the long Liberal Period. The Liberal Period was marked by corruption, government instability, continued poverty in Southern Italy and the use of authoritarian measures by the Italian government.

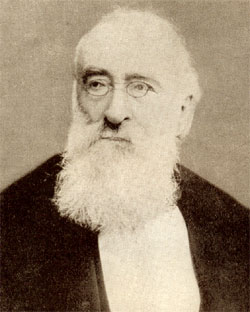
Agostino Depretis

Depretis began his term as prime minister by initiating an experimental political notion known as trasformismo ("transformism"). The theory of trasformismo was that a cabinet should select a variety of moderates and capable politicians from a non-partisan perspective. In practice, trasformismo was authoritarian and corrupt as Depretis pressured districts to vote for his candidates if they wished to gain favourable concessions from Depretis when in power. The results of the Italian general election of 1876 resulted in only four representatives from the right being elected, allowing the government to be dominated by Depretis. Despotic and corrupt actions are believed to be the key means by which Depretis managed to keep support in Southern Italy. Depretis put through authoritarian measures, such as banning public meetings, placing "dangerous" individuals in internal exile on remote penal islands across Italy and adopting militarist policies. Depretis enacted controversial legislation for the time, such as abolishing arrest for debt and making elementary education free and compulsory while ending compulsory religious teaching in elementary schools.

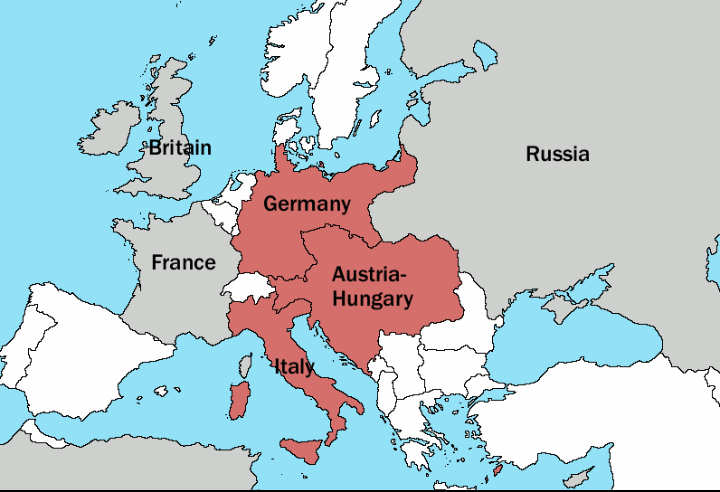
The Triple Alliance in 1913, shown in red

In 1887, Francesco Crispi became prime minister and began focusing government efforts on foreign policy. Crispi worked to build Italy as a great world power through increased military expenditures, advocacy of expansionism and trying to win the favor of Germany. Italy joined the Triple Alliance, which included both Germany and Austria-Hungary in 1882 and which remained officially intact until 1915. While helping Italy develop strategically, he continued trasformismo and became authoritarian, once suggesting the use of martial law to ban opposition parties. Despite being authoritarian, Crispi put through liberal policies such as the Public Health Act of 1888 and established tribunals for redress against abuses by the government.

==== Francesco Crispi ====
Francesco Crispi was prime minister for a total of six years, from 1887 until 1891 and again from 1893 until 1896. Historian R. J. B. Bosworth says of his foreign policy:

Crispi pursued policies whose openly aggressive character would not be equaled until the days of the Fascist regime. Crispi increased military expenditure, talked cheerfully of a European conflagration, and alarmed his German or British friends with signs of preventative attacks on his enemies. His policies were ruinous for Italy's trade with France and, more humiliatingly, for colonial ambitions in Eastern Africa. Crispi's lust for territory there was thwarted when on 1 March 1896, the armies of Ethiopian Emperor Menelik routed Italian forces at Adowa [...] an unparalleled disaster for a modern army. Crispi, whose private life (he was perhaps a trigamist) and personal finances [...] were objects of perennial scandal, went into dishonorable retirement.

Crispi greatly admired the United Kingdom, but was unable to get British assistance for his aggressive foreign policy and turned instead to Germany. Crispi also enlarged the army and navy and advocated expansionism as he sought Germany's favor by joining the Triple Alliance which included both Germany and Austria-Hungary in 1882. It remained officially intact until 1915 and prevented hostilities between Italy and Austria, which controlled border regions that Italy claimed.

==== Colonialism ====
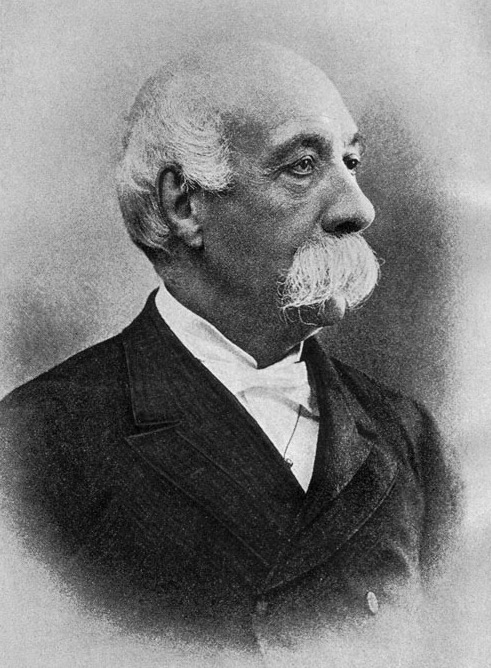
Francesco Crispi promoted the Italian colonialism in Africa in the late 19th century.

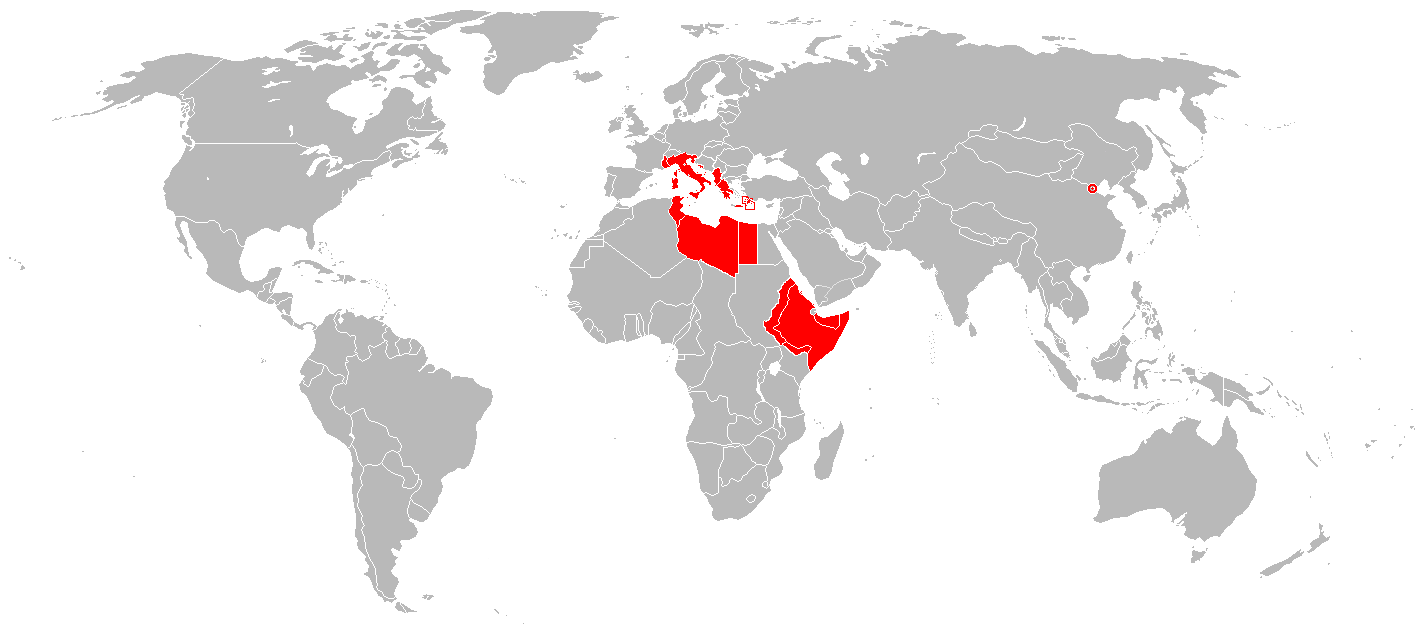
Italian Empire at greatest extent in 1942-43.

In the late 19th and early 20th century, Italy emulated the Great Powers in acquiring colonies, especially in the scramble to take control of Africa that took place in the 1870s. Italy was weak in military and economic resources compared to Britain, France and Germany. Still, it proved difficult due to popular resistance. It was unprofitable due to high military costs and the lesser economic value of spheres of influence remaining when Italy began to colonize. Britain was eager to block French influence and assisted Italy in gaining territory of the Red Sea.

Several colonial projects were undertaken by the government. These were done to gain the support of Italian nationalists and imperialists, who wanted to rebuild a Roman Empire. Italy had already large settlements in Alexandria, Cairo and Tunis. Italy first attempted to gain colonies through negotiations with other world powers to make colonial concessions, but these negotiations failed. Italy also sent missionaries to uncolonized lands to investigate the potential for Italian colonization. The most promising and realistic of these were parts of Africa. Italian missionaries had already established a foothold at Massawa (in present-day Eritrea) in the 1830s and had entered deep into the Ethiopian Empire.

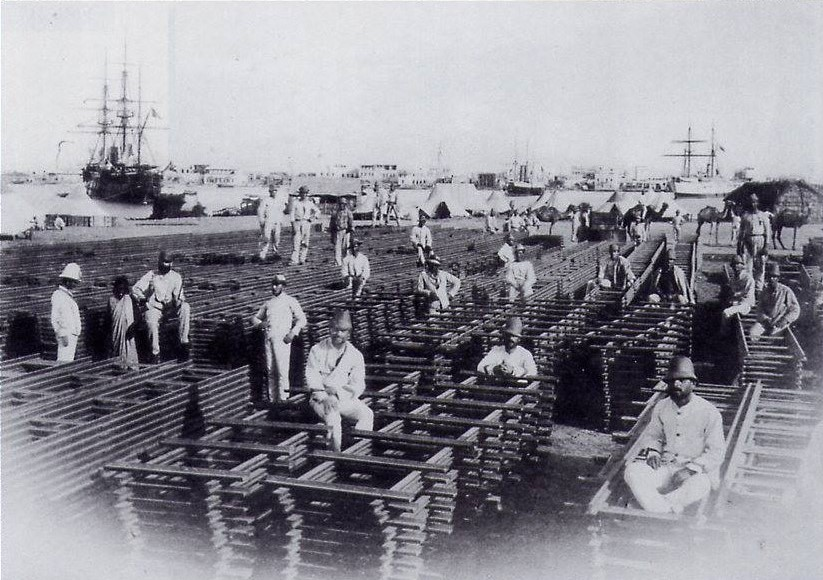
Members of the Ferrovieri Engineer Regiment during the construction of the rails to connect Massawa to Saati in Italian Eritrea, 1886.

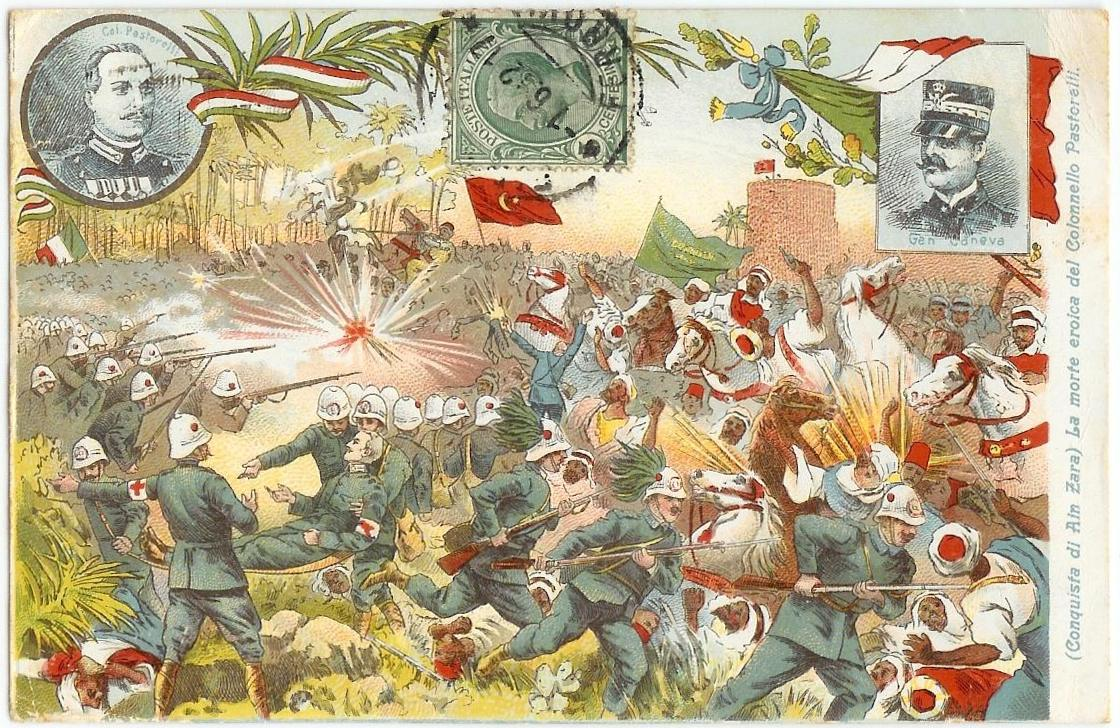
The Ain Zara oasis during the Italo-Turkish War: propaganda postcard made by the Italian Army

The beginning of colonialism came in 1885, shortly after the fall of Egyptian rule in Khartoum, when Italy landed soldiers at Massawa in East Africa. In 1888, Italy annexed Massawa by force, creating the colony of Italian Eritrea. The Eritrean ports of Massawa and Assab handled trade with Italy and Ethiopia. The trade was promoted by the low duties paid on Italian trade. Italy exported manufactured products and imported coffee, beeswax and hides. At the same time, Italy occupied territory on the south side of the horn of Africa, forming what would become Italian Somaliland.

The Treaty of Wuchale, signed in 1889, stated in the Italian language version that Ethiopia was to become an Italian protectorate, while the Ethiopian Amharic language version stated that the Ethiopian emperor Menelik II could go through Italy to conduct foreign affairs. This happened presumably due to the mistranslation of a verb, which formed a permissive clause in Amharic and a mandatory one in Italian. When the differences in the versions came to light, in 1895 Menelik II abrogated the treaty and abandoned the agreement to follow Italian foreign policy. Because of the Ethiopian refusal to abide by the Italian version of the treaty and despite economic handicaps at home, the Italian government decided on a military solution to force Ethiopia to abide by the Italian version of the treaty. In doing so, they believed that they could exploit divisions within Ethiopia and rely on tactical and technological superiority to offset any inferiority in numbers. As a result, Italy and Ethiopia came into confrontation, in what was later to be known as the First Italo-Ethiopian War.

The Royal Italian Army failed on the battlefield and was overwhelmed by a huge Ethiopian army at the Battle of Adwa. At that point, the Italian invasion force was forced to retreat into Eritrea. The war formally ended with the Treaty of Addis Ababa in 1896, which abrogated the Treaty of Wuchale, recognizing Ethiopia as an independent country. The failed Ethiopian campaign was one of the few military victories scored by the Africans against an imperial power at this time.

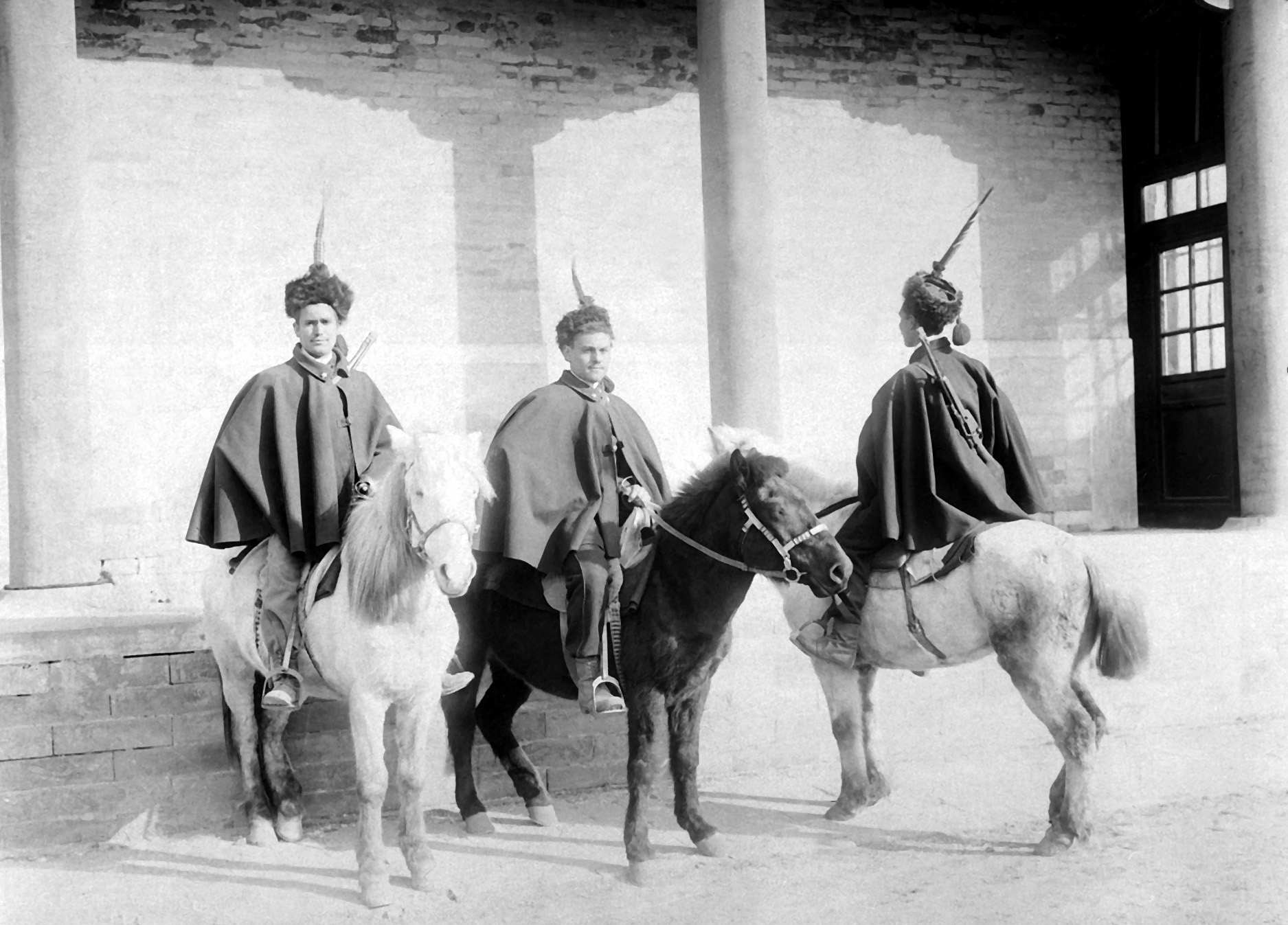
Italian mounted infantry in China during the Boxer Rebellion in 1900

From 2 November 1899 to 7 September 1901, Italy participated as part of the Eight-Nation Alliance forces during the Boxer Rebellion in China. On 7 September 1901, a concession in Tientsin was ceded to Italy by the Qing dynasty. On 7 June 1902, the concession was taken into Italian possession and administered by an Italian consul.

In 1911, Italy declared war on the Ottoman Empire and invaded Tripolitania, Fezzan and Cyrenaica. These provinces together formed what became known as Libya. The war ended only one year later, but the occupation resulted in acts of discrimination against Libyans, such as the forced deportation of Libyans to the Tremiti Islands in October 1911. By 1912, one-third of these Libyan refugees had died from a lack of food and shelter. The annexation of Libya led nationalists to advocate Italian domination of the Mediterranean Sea by occupying Greece and the Adriatic Sea coastal region of Dalmatia.

==== Giovanni Giolitti ====
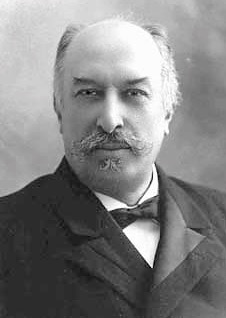
Giovanni Giolitti was Prime Minister of Italy five times between 1892 and 1921.

In 1892, Giovanni Giolitti became Prime Minister of Italy for his first term. Although his first government quickly collapsed one year later, Giolitti returned in 1903 to lead Italy's government during a fragmented period until 1914. Giolitti had spent his earlier life as a civil servant and then took positions within the cabinets of Crispi. Giolitti was the first long-term Italian prime minister because he mastered the political concept of trasformismo by manipulating, coercing and bribing officials to his side. In elections during Giolitti's government, voting fraud was common. Giolitti helped improve voting only in well-off, more supportive areas while attempting to isolate and intimidate poor areas where opposition was strong. Southern Italy was in terrible shape before and during Giolitti's tenure as prime minister: four-fifths of southern Italians were illiterate, and the dire situation there ranged from problems of large numbers of absentee landlords to rebellion and even starvation. Corruption was such a large problem that Giolitti himself admitted that there were places "where the law does not operate at all".

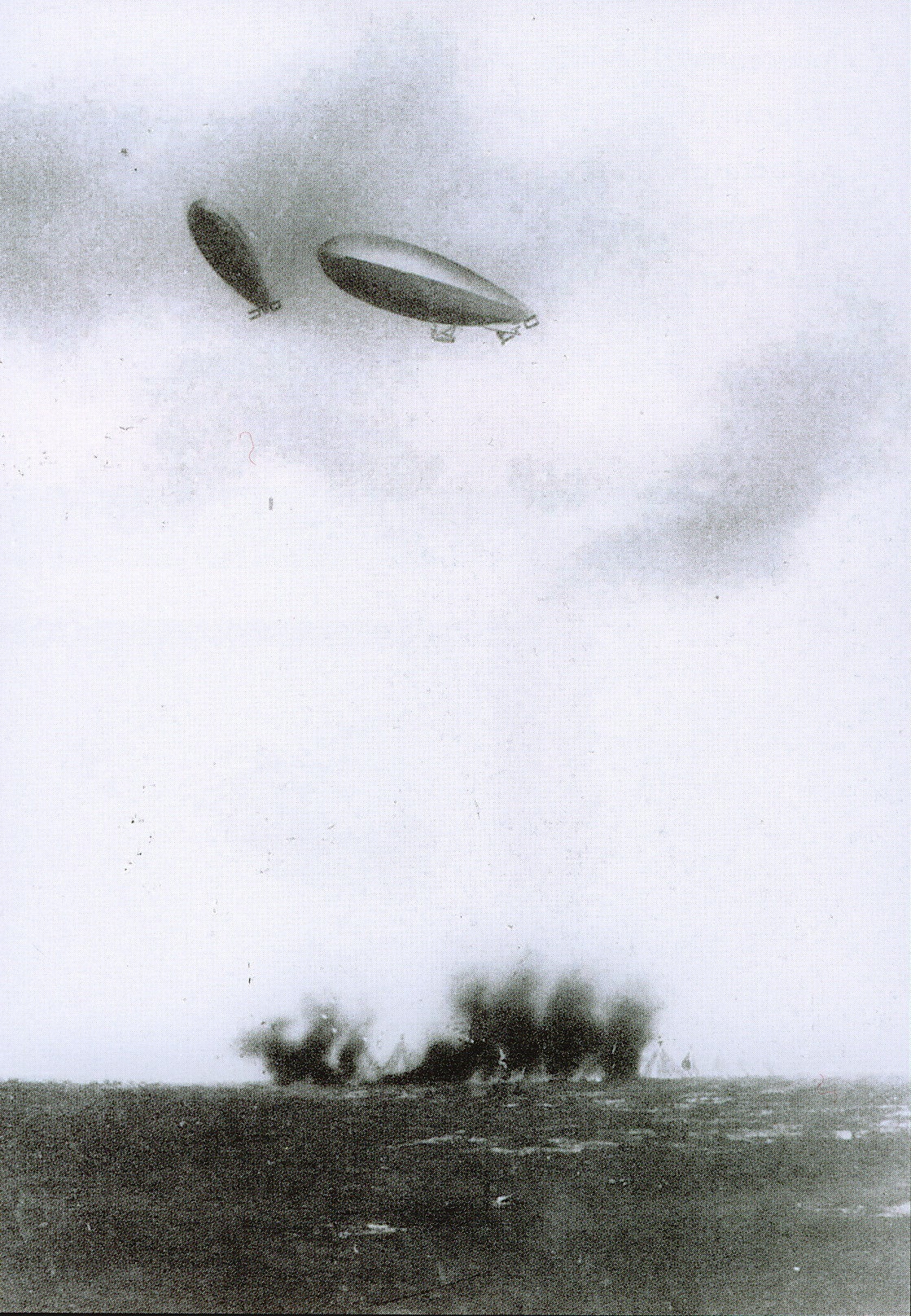
Italian dirigibles bomb Turkish positions in Libya, as the Italo-Turkish War of 1911–1912 was the first in history in which air attacks (carried out here by dirigible airships) determined the outcome.

In 1911, Giolitti's government sent forces to occupy Libya. While the success of the Libyan War improved the status of the nationalists, it did not help Giolitti's administration as a whole. The government attempted to discourage criticism by speaking about Italy's strategic achievements and inventiveness of their military in the war: Italy was the first country to use the airship for military purposes and undertook aerial bombing on the Ottoman forces. The war radicalized the Italian Socialist Party, and anti-war revolutionaries called for violence to bring down the government. Elections were held in 1913, and Giolitti's coalition retained an absolute majority in the Chamber of Deputies, while the Radical Party emerged as the largest opposition bloc. The Italian Socialist Party gained eight seats and was the largest party in Emilia-Romagna. Giolitti's coalition did not endure long after the election, and he was forced to resign in March 1914. Giolitti later returned as prime minister only briefly in 1920, but the era of liberalism was effectively over in Italy.

The 1913 and 1919 elections saw gains made by Socialist, Catholic and nationalist parties at the expense of the traditionally dominant Liberals and Radicals, who were increasingly fractured and weakened as a result.

=== World War I and failure of the liberal state (1915–1922) ===
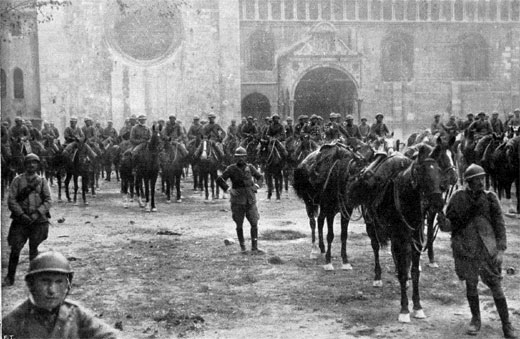
Italian cavalry in Trento on 3 November 1918, after the victorious Battle of Vittorio Veneto

Italy entered into the First World War in 1915 with the aim of completing national unity: for this reason, the Italian intervention in the First World War is also considered the Fourth Italian War of Independence, in a historiographical perspective that identifies in the latter the conclusion of the unification of Italy.

The war forced the decision whether to honor the alliance with Germany and Austria. For six months Italy remained neutral, as the Triple Alliance was only for defensive purposes. Italy took the initiative in entering the war in spring 1915, despite strong popular and elite sentiment in favor of neutrality. Italy was a large, poor country whose political system was chaotic, its finances were heavily strained, and its army was very poorly prepared. The Triple Alliance meant little either to Italians or Austrians – Vienna had declared war on Serbia without consulting Rome. Prime Minister Antonio Salandra and Foreign Minister Sidney Sonnino negotiated with both sides in secret for the best deal, and got one from the Entente, which was quite willing to promise large slices of the Austro-Hungarian Empire, including the Tyrol and Trieste, as well as making Albania a protectorate. Russia vetoed giving Italy Dalmatia. Britain was willing to pay subsidies and loans to get 36 million Italians as new allies who threatened the southern flank of Austria.

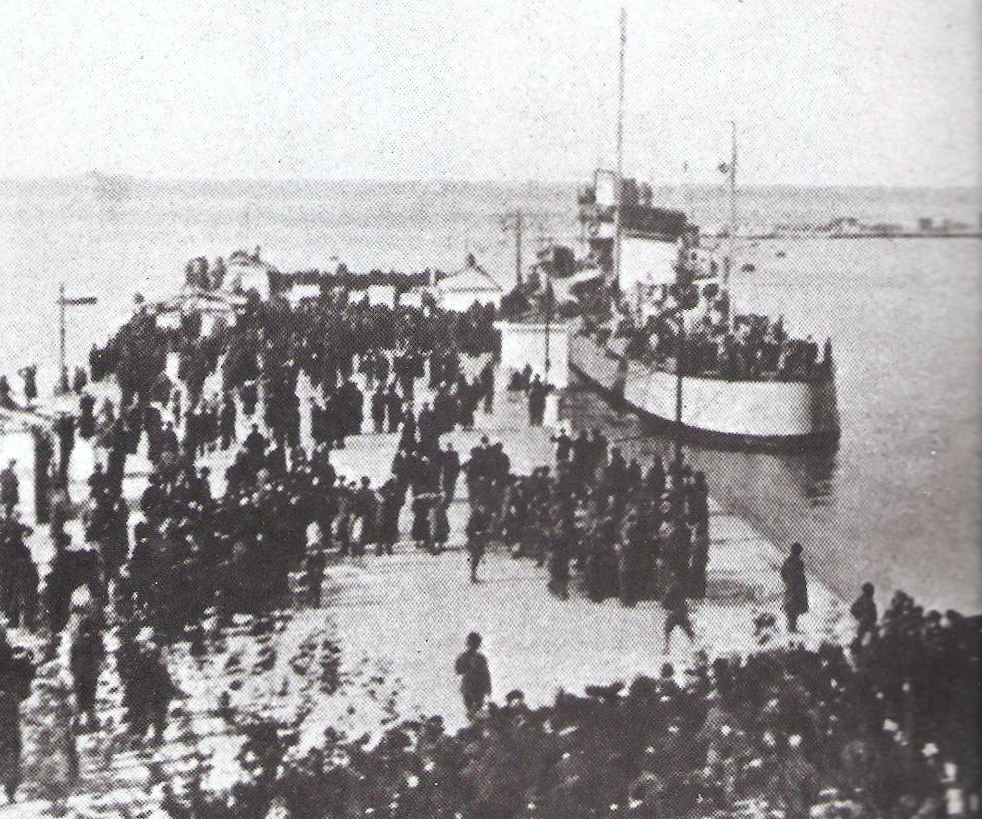
Italian troops landing in Trieste, 3 November 1918

When the Treaty of London was announced in May 1915, there was an uproar from antiwar elements. Reports from around Italy showed the people feared war, and cared little about territorial gains. Rural folk saw war as a disaster, like drought, famine or plague. Businessmen were generally opposed, fearing heavy-handed government controls and taxes, and loss of foreign markets. Reversing the decision seemed impossible, for the Triple Alliance did not want Italy back, and the king's throne was at risk. Pro-war supporters mobbed the streets. The fervor for war represented a bitterly hostile reaction against politics as usual, and the failures, frustrations, and stupidities of the ruling class. Benito Mussolini created the newspaper Il Popolo d'Italia, which at first attempted to convince socialists and revolutionaries to support the war. The Allied Powers, eager to draw Italy to the war, helped finance the newspaper. Later, after the war, this publication would become the official newspaper of the Fascist movement.

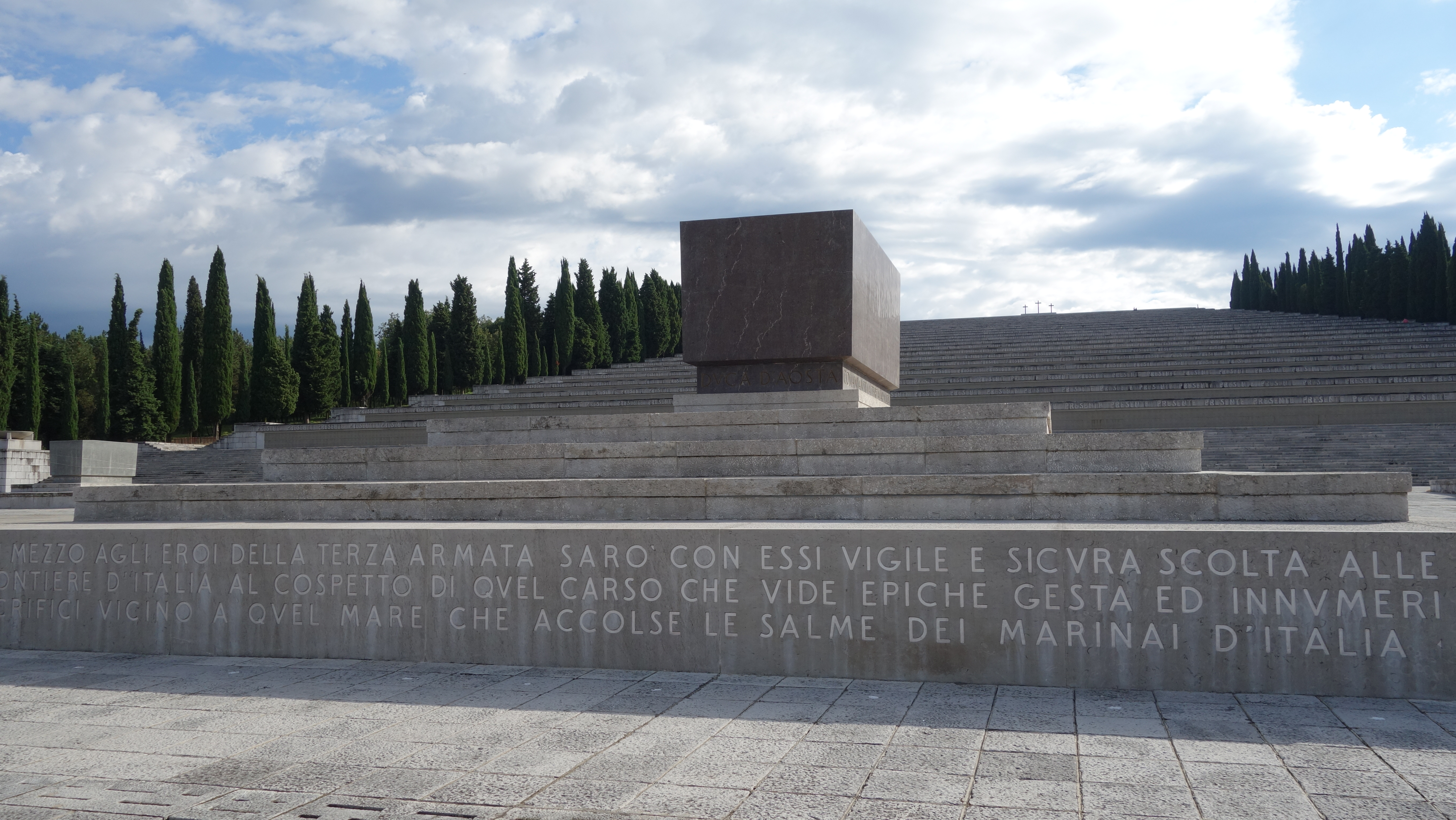
The Redipuglia War Memorial of Redipuglia, with the tomb of Prince Emanuele Filiberto, Duke of Aosta in the foreground

Italy entered the war with an army of 875,000 men, but the army was poorly led and lacked heavy artillery and machine guns, their war supplies having been largely depleted in the war of 1911–12 against Turkey. Italy proved unable to prosecute the war effectively, as fighting raged for three years on a very narrow front along the Isonzo River, where the Austrians held the high ground. In 1916, Italy declared war on Germany, which provided significant aid to the Austrians. Some 650,000 Italian soldiers died and 950,000 were wounded, while the economy required large-scale Allied funding to survive.

Before the war the government had ignored labor issues, but now it had to intervene to mobilize war production. With the main working-class Socialist party reluctant to support the war effort, strikes were frequent and cooperation was minimal, especially in the Socialist strongholds of Piedmont and Lombardy. The government imposed high wage scales, as well as collective bargaining and insurance schemes. Many large firms expanded dramatically. Inflation doubled the cost of living. Industrial wages kept pace but not wages for farm workers. Discontent was high in rural areas since so many men were taken for service, industrial jobs were unavailable, wages grew slowly and inflation was just as bad.

The Italian victory, which was announced by the Bollettino della Vittoria and the Bollettino della Vittoria Navale, marked the end of the war on the Italian Front, secured the dissolution of the Austro-Hungarian Empire and was chiefly instrumental in ending the First World War less than two weeks later. More than 651,000 Italian soldiers died on the battlefields. The Italian civilian deaths were estimated at 589,000 due to malnutrition and food shortages. In November 1918, after the surrender of Austria-Hungary, Italy occupied militarily Trentino Alto-Adige, the Julian March, Istria, the Kvarner Gulf and Dalmatia, all Austro-Hungarian territories. On the Dalmatian coast, Italy established the Governorate of Dalmatia, which had the provisional aim of ferrying the territory towards full integration into the Kingdom of Italy, progressively importing national legislation in place of the previous one. The administrative capital was Zara. The Governorate of Dalmatia was evacuated following the Italo-Yugoslav agreements which resulted in the Treaty of Rapallo (1920).

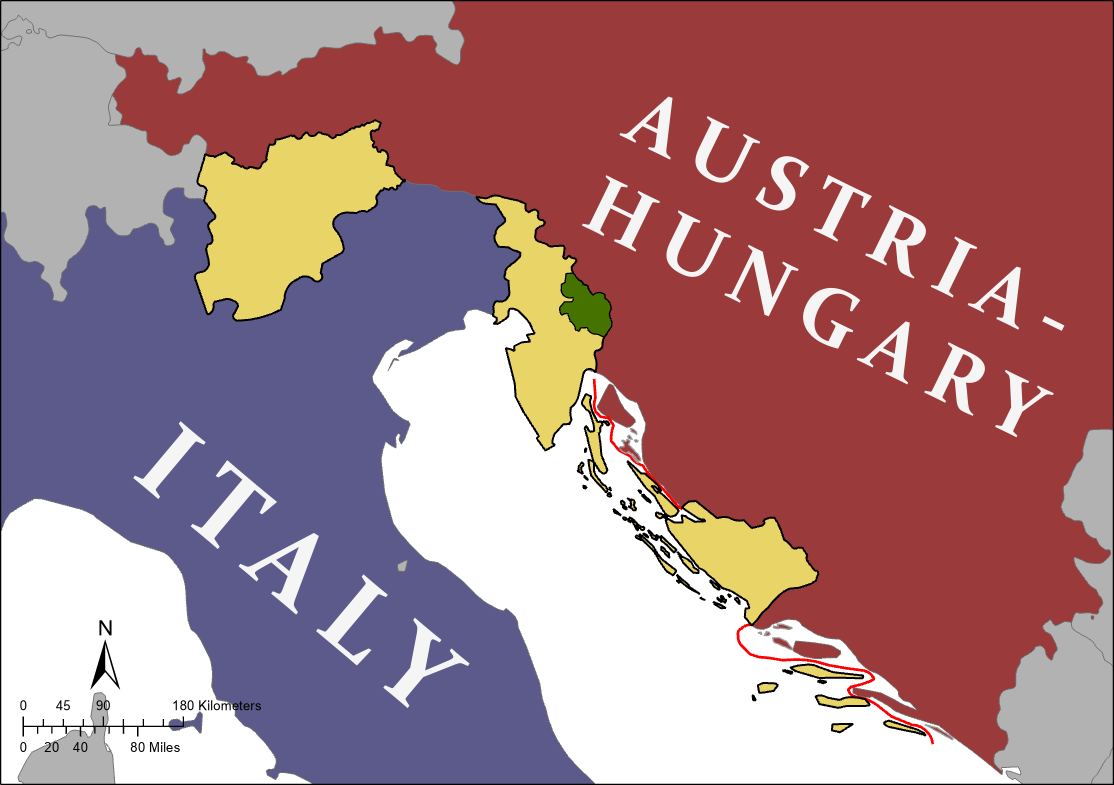
Territories promised to Italy by the Treaty of London (1915), i.e. Trentino-Alto Adige, the Julian March and Dalmatia (tan), and the Snežnik Plateau area (green). Dalmatia, after WWI, however, was not assigned to Italy but to Yugoslavia.

As the war came to an end, Italian Prime Minister Vittorio Emanuele Orlando met with British Prime Minister David Lloyd George, Prime Minister of France Georges Clemenceau and United States President Woodrow Wilson in Versailles to discuss how the borders of Europe should be redefined to help avoid a future European war. The talks provided little territorial gain to Italy as Wilson promised freedom to all European nationalities to form their nation-states. As a result, the Treaty of Versailles did not assign Dalmatia and Albania to Italy as had been promised in the Treaty of London. Furthermore, the British and French decided to divide the German overseas colonies into their mandates, with Italy receiving none. Italy also gained no territory from the breakup of the Ottoman Empire. Despite this, Orlando agreed to sign the Treaty of Versailles, which caused uproar against his government. The Treaty of Saint-Germain-en-Laye (1919) and the Treaty of Rapallo (1920) allowed the annexation of Trentino Alto-Adige, the Julian March, Istria, Kvarner as well as the Dalmatian city of Zara.

Furious over the peace settlement, the Italian nationalist poet Gabriele D'Annunzio led disaffected war veterans and nationalists to form the Free State of Fiume in September 1919. His popularity among nationalists led him to be called Il Duce ("The Leader"), and he used black-shirted paramilitary in his assault on Fiume. The leadership title of Duce and the blackshirt paramilitary uniform would later be adopted by the Fascist movement of Benito Mussolini. The demand for the Italian annexation of Fiume spread to all sides of the political spectrum, including Mussolini's Fascists.

The subsequent Treaty of Rome (1924) led to the annexation of the city of Fiume to Italy. Italy's lack of territorial gain led to the outcome being denounced as a mutilated victory. The rhetoric of mutilated victory was adopted by Mussolini and led to the rise of Italian fascism, becoming a key point in the propaganda of Fascist Italy. Historians regard mutilated victory as a "political myth", used by fascists to fuel Italian imperialism and obscure the successes of liberal Italy in the aftermath of World War I. Italy also gained a permanent seat in the League of Nations's executive council.

=== Fascist regime, World War II, and Civil War (1922–1946) ===
==== Rise of Fascism into power ====
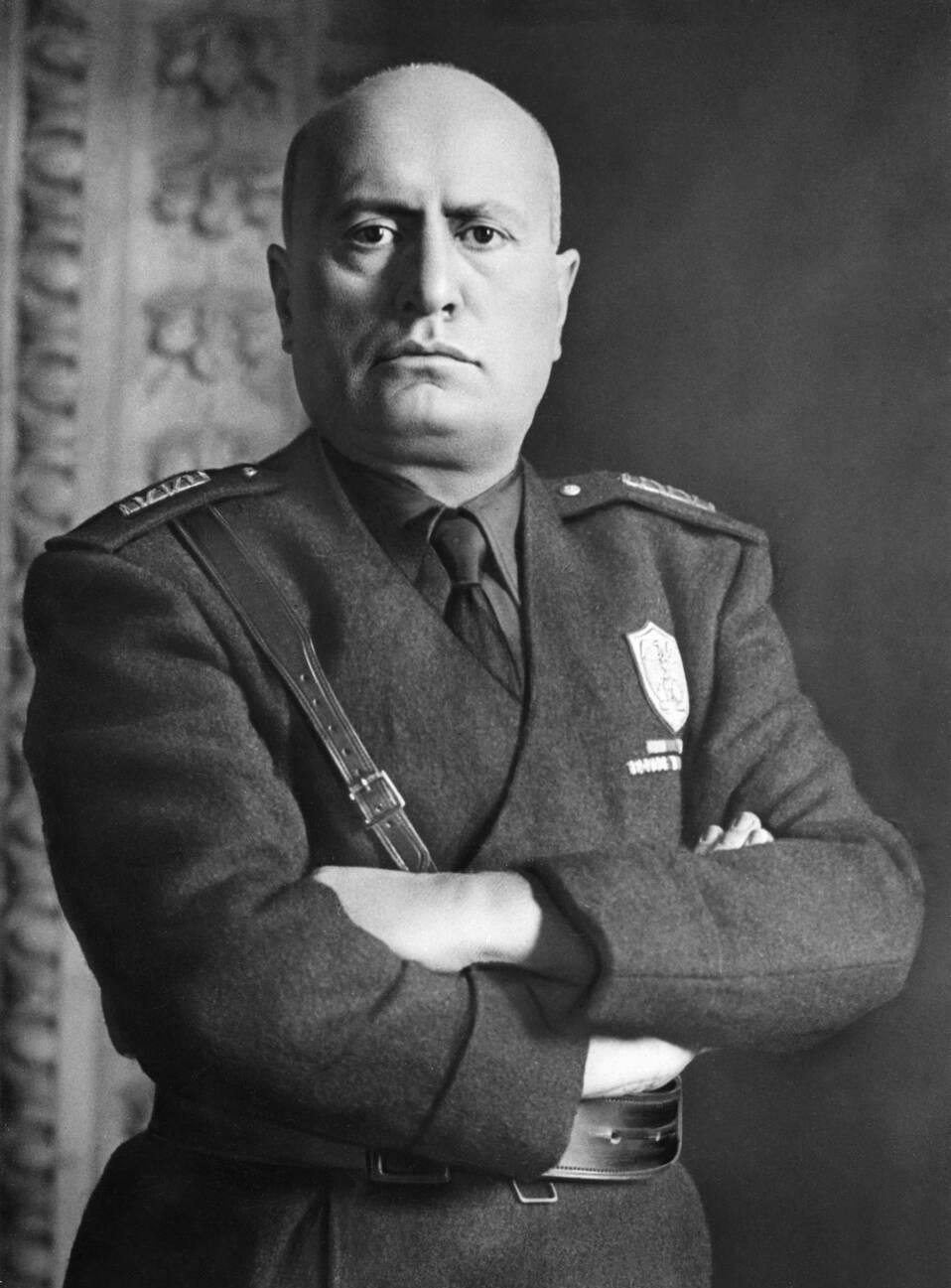
Benito Mussolini, who titled himself Duce ruled the country from 1922 to1943.

Benito Mussolini created the Fasci di Combattimento or Combat League in 1919. It was originally dominated by patriotic socialist and syndicalist veterans who opposed the pacifist policies of the Italian Socialist Party. This early Fascist movement had a platform more inclined to the left, promising social revolution, proportional representation in elections, women's suffrage (partly realized in 1925) and dividing rural private property held by estates. They also differed from later Fascism by opposing censorship, militarism and dictatorship.

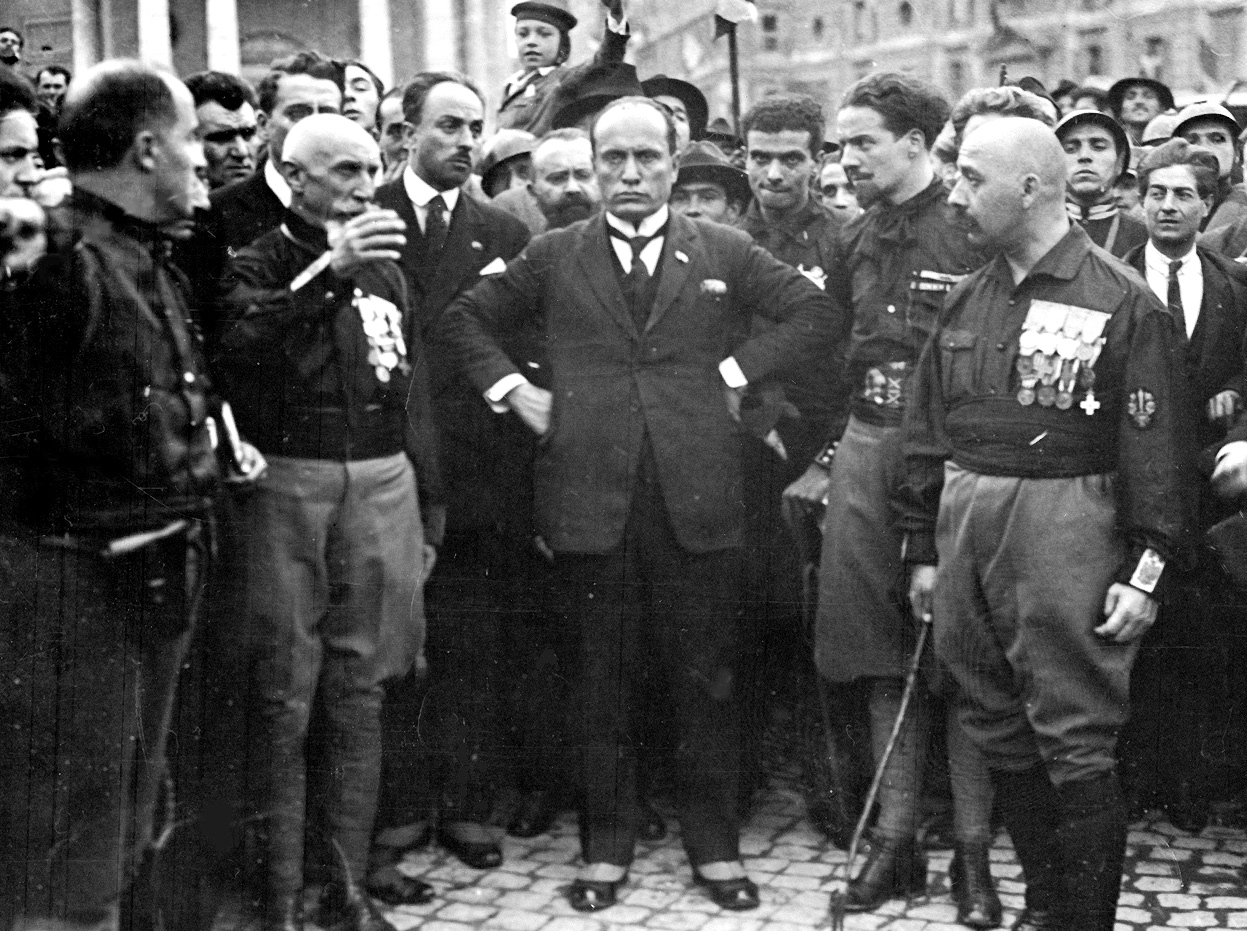
Benito Mussolini during the March on Rome in 1922

At the same time, the so-called Biennio Rosso ("Red Biennium" or "Two Red Years") took place in the two years following the war in a context of economic crisis, high unemployment and political instability. The 1919–20 period was characterized by mass strikes, worker manifestations as well as self-management experiments through land and factory occupations. In Turin and Milan, workers councils were formed and many factory occupations took place under the leadership of anarcho-syndicalists. The agitations also extended to the agricultural areas of the Padan plain and were accompanied by peasant strikes, rural unrests and guerilla conflicts between left-wing and right-wing militias. Thenceforth, the Fasci di Combattimento (forerunner of the National Fascist Party, 1921) successfully exploited the claims of Italian nationalists and the quest for order and normalization of the middle class. In October 1922, Mussolini took advantage of a general strike to announce his demands to the Italian government to give the Fascist Party political power or face a coup. With no immediate response, a group of 30,000 Fascists began a long trek across Italy to Rome (the March on Rome), claiming that Fascists were intending to restore law and order. The Fascists demanded Prime Minister Luigi Facta's resignation and that Mussolini be named to the post. Although the Italian Army was far better armed than the Fascist militias, the liberal system and King Victor Emmanuel III were facing a deeper political crisis. The King was forced to choose which of the two rival movements in Italy would form the government: Mussolini's Fascists, or the Marxist Italian Socialist Party. He selected the Fascists.

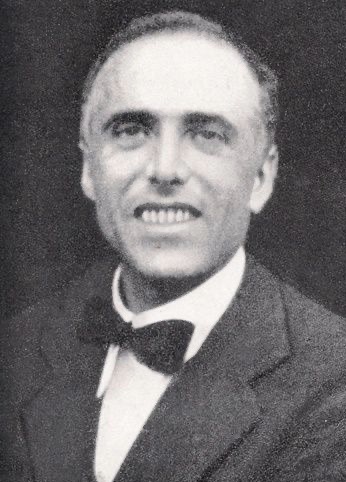
Socialist leader Giacomo Matteotti was murdered a few days after he openly denounced Fascist violence during the 1924 elections.

Mussolini formed a coalition with nationalists and liberals, and in 1923 passed the electoral Acerbo Law, which assigned two-thirds of the seats to the party that achieved at least 25% of the vote. The Fascist Party used violence and intimidation to achieve the threshold in the 1924 election, thus obtaining control of Parliament. Socialist deputy Giacomo Matteotti was assassinated after calling for a nullification of the vote. The parliament opposition responded to Matteotti's assassination with the Aventine Secession.

Over the next four years, Mussolini eliminated nearly all checks and balances on his power. On 24 December 1925, he passed a law that declared he was responsible to the King alone, making him the sole person able to determine Parliament's agenda. Local governments were dissolved, and appointed officials (called podestà) replaced elected mayors and councils. In 1928, all political parties were banned, and parliamentary elections were replaced by plebiscites in which the Grand Council of Fascism nominated a single list of 400 candidates. Christopher Duggan argues that his regime exploited Mussolini's popular appeal and forged a cult of personality that served as the model that was emulated by dictators of other fascist regimes of the 1930s.

In summary, historian Stanley G. Payne says that Fascism in Italy was:

A primarily political dictatorship. The Fascist Party itself had become almost completely bureaucratized and subservient to, not dominant over, the state itself. Big business, industry, and finance retained extensive autonomy, particularly in the early years. The armed forces also enjoyed considerable autonomy. ... The Fascist militia was placed under military control. The judicial system was left largely intact and relatively autonomous as well. The police continued to be directed by state officials and were not taken over by party leaders, nor was a major new police elite created. There was never any question of bringing the Church under overall subservience. Sizable sectors of Italian cultural life retained extensive autonomy, and no major state propaganda-and-culture ministry existed. The Mussolini regime was neither especially sanguinary nor particularly repressive.

==== End of the Roman question ====
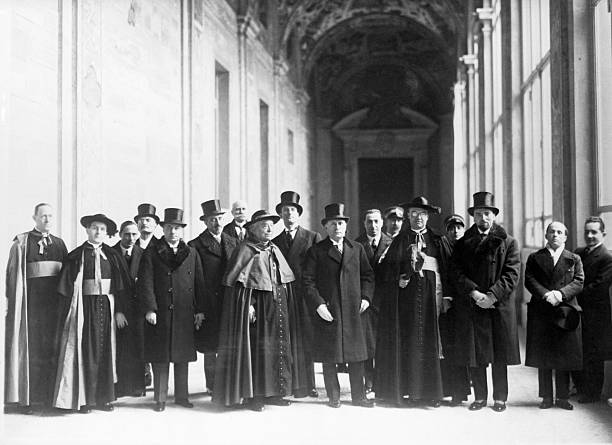
Vatican and Italian delegations prior to signing the Lateran Treaty

During the unification of Italy in the mid-19th century, the Papal States resisted incorporation into the new nation. The nascent Kingdom of Italy invaded and occupied Romagna, Marche and Umbria (the eastern portions of the Papal States) in 1860, leaving only Latium in the pope's domains. Latium, including Rome itself, was occupied and annexed in 1870. For the following sixty years, relations between the papacy and the Italian government were hostile, and the status of the pope became known as the "Roman question". The Lateran Treaty was one component of the Lateran Pacts of 1929, agreements between the Kingdom of Italy under King Victor Emmanuel III and the Holy See under Pope Pius XI to settle the question. The treaty and associated pacts were signed on 11 February 1929. The treaty recognized Vatican City as an independent state under the sovereignty of the Holy See. The Italian government also agreed to give the Roman Catholic Church financial compensation for the loss of the Papal States. In 1948, the Lateran Treaty was recognized in the Constitution of Italy as regulating the relations between the state and the Catholic Church. The treaty was significantly revised in 1984, ending the status of Catholicism as the sole state religion.

==== Foreign politics ====
Stephen J. Lee identifies three major themes in Mussolini's foreign policy. The first was a continuation of the foreign-policy objectives of the preceding Liberal regime. Liberal Italy had allied itself with Germany and Austria-Hungary, and had great ambitions in the Balkans and North Africa. Ever since it had been badly defeated in Ethiopia in 1896, there was a strong demand for seizing that country. Second was a profound disillusionment after the heavy losses of the First World War; the small territorial gains from Austria were not enough to compensate. Third was Mussolini's promise to restore the pride and glory of the Roman Empire.

Italian Fascism is based upon Italian nationalism and in particular seeks to complete what it considers as the incomplete project of Risorgimento by incorporating Italia Irredenta (unredeemed Italy) into the state of Italy. To the east of Italy, the Fascists claimed that Dalmatia was a land of Italian culture. To the south of Italy, the Fascists claimed Malta, which belonged to the United Kingdom, and Corfu, which belonged to Greece, to the north claimed Italian Switzerland, while to the west claimed Corsica, Nice and Savoy, which belonged to France.

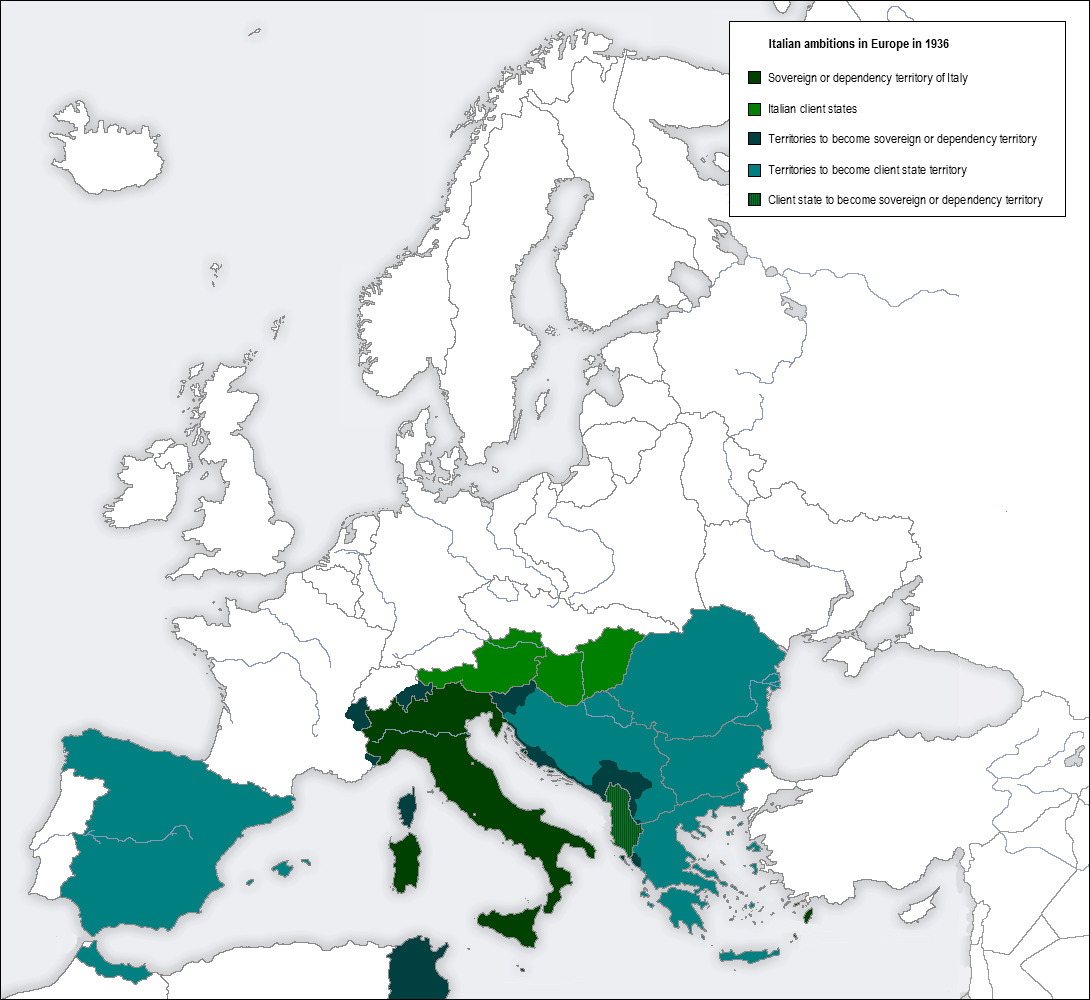
Ambitions of Fascist Italy in Europe in 1936. Legend: Metropolitan Italy and dependent territories; Client states; Claimed territories to be annexed; Territories to be transformed into client states. Albania, which was a client state, was considered a territory to be annexed.

Mussolini promised to bring Italy back as a great power in Europe, building a "New Roman Empire" and holding power over the Mediterranean Sea. In propaganda, Fascists used the ancient Roman motto "Mare Nostrum" (Latin for "Our Sea") to describe the Mediterranean. For this reason the Fascist regime engaged in interventionist foreign policy in Europe. In 1923, the Greek island of Corfu was briefly occupied by Italy, after the assassination of General Enrico Tellini in Greek territory. In 1925, Albania came under heavy Italian influence as a result of the Tirana Treaties, which also gave Italy a stronger position in the Balkans. Relations with France were mixed. The Fascist regime planned to regain Italian-populated areas of France. With the rise of Nazism, it became more concerned of the potential threat of Nazi Germany to Italy. Due to concerns of German expansionism, Italy joined the Stresa Front with France and the United Kingdom, which existed from 1935 to 1936. The Fascist regime held negative relations with Yugoslavia, as it continued to claim Dalmatia.

During the Spanish Civil War between the socialist Republicans and Nationalists led by Francisco Franco, Italy sent arms and over 60,000 troops to aid the Nationalist faction. This secured Italy's naval access to Spanish ports and increased Italian influence in the Mediterranean. During the 1930s, Italy strongly pursued a policy of naval rearmament; by 1940, the Regia Marina was the fourth largest navy in the world.

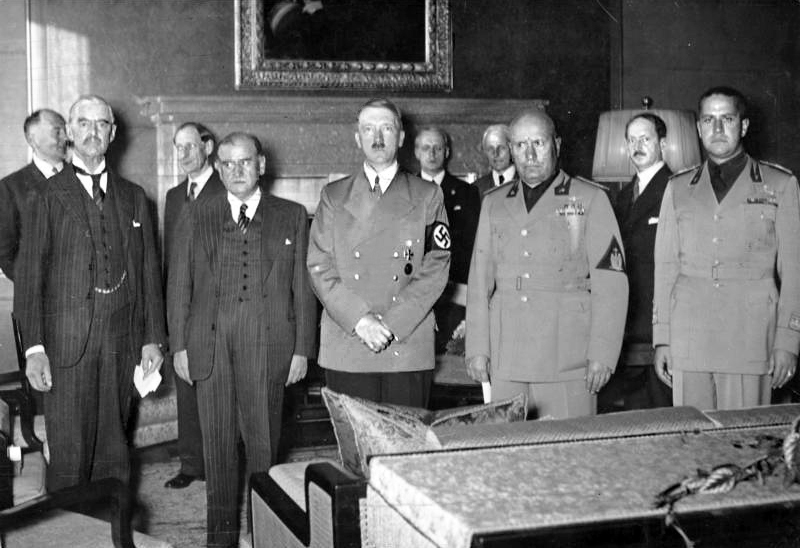
From left to right: Chamberlain, Daladier, Hitler, Mussolini and Italian foreign minister Count Ciano at the signing of Munich Agreement

Mussolini and Adolf Hitler first met in June 1934, when Mussolini opposed German plans to annex Austria to ensure that Nazi Germany would not become hegemonic in Europe. Public appearances and propaganda constantly portrayed the closeness of Mussolini and Hitler and the similarities between Italian Fascism and German National Socialism. While both ideologies had significant similarities, the two factions were suspicious of each other, and both leaders were in competition for world influence.

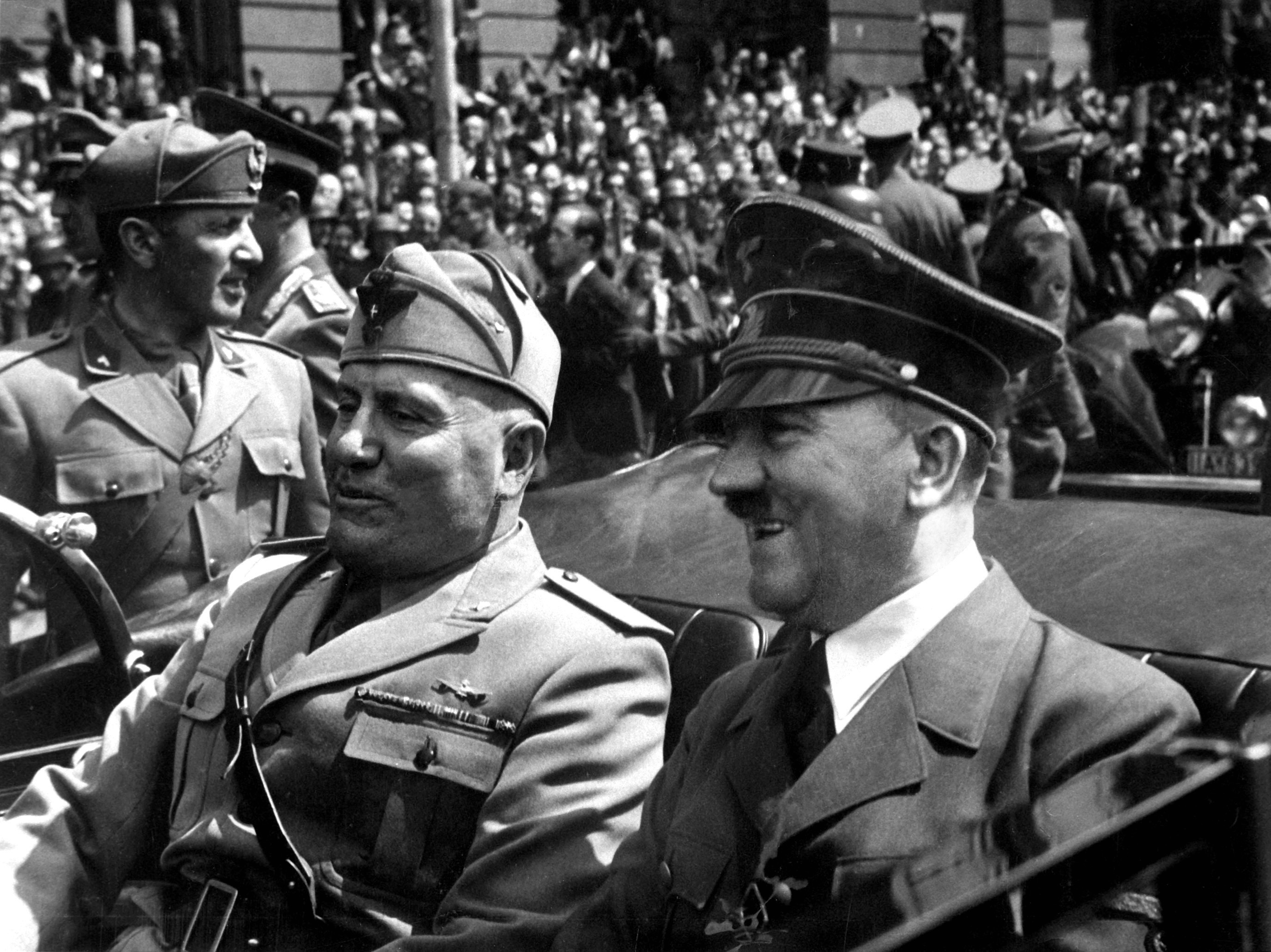
Mussolini and Hitler in June 1940

After completing the pacification of Libya, Mussolini decided to launch the war in Ethiopia, one of the few uncolonized African territories. The Second Italo-Ethiopian War, which began in October 1935, was characterized by the massive use of force and the use of chemical weapons against the Ethiopians. Victory, announced in 9 May 1936 after the entry of Italian troops into Addis Ababa, led to the proclamation of the Italian Empire. However, the war resulted in the international isolation of Italy; the only nation to back Italy's aggression was Nazi Germany. After being condemned by the League of Nations, Italy decided to leave the League on 11 December 1937. Mussolini had little choice but to join Hitler in international politics, thus he reluctantly abandoned support of Austrian independence and Hitler proceeded with the Anschluss, the annexation of Austria, in 1938. Mussolini later supported German claims on Sudetenland at the Munich Conference. In 1938, under influence of Hitler, Mussolini supported the adoption of antisemitic racial laws in Italy. After Germany annexed Czechoslovakia in March 1939, Italy invaded Albania and made it an Italian protectorate.

As war approached in 1939, the Fascist regime stepped up an aggressive press campaign against France claiming that its Italian residents were suffering. This was important to the alliance as both regimes mutually had claims on France: Germany on German-populated Alsace and Lorraine and Italy on the mixed Italian and French populated Nice and Corsica. In May 1939, a formal alliance with Germany was signed, known as the Pact of Steel. Mussolini felt obliged to sign the pact in spite of his own concerns that Italy could not fight a war in the near future. This obligation grew from his promises to Italians that he would build an empire for them and from his personal desire to not allow Hitler to become the dominant leader in Europe. Mussolini was repulsed by the Molotov–Ribbentrop Pact agreement where Germany and the Soviet Union agreed to partition the Second Polish Republic into German and Soviet zones for an impending invasion. The Fascist government saw this as a betrayal of the Anti-Comintern Pact, but decided to remain officially silent.

==== World War II and fall of Fascism ====
When Germany invaded Poland on 1 September 1939 beginning World War II, Mussolini chose to stay non-belligerent, although he declared his support for Hitler. In drawing out war plans, Mussolini and the Fascist regime decided that Italy would aim to annex large portions of Africa and the Middle East. Hesitance remained from the King and military commander Pietro Badoglio, who warned Mussolini that Italy had too few tanks, armoured vehicles, and aircraft available to be able to carry out a long-term war; Badoglio told Mussolini "It is suicide" for Italy to get involved in the European conflict. Mussolini and the Fascist regime thus waited as France was invaded by Germany in June 1940 before deciding to get involved.

Italy entered the war on 10 June 1940, fulfilling its obligations towards the Pact of Steel. Mussolini hoped to quickly capture Savoy, Nice, Corsica, and the African colonies of Tunisia and Algeria from the French, on 21 June, Italy invaded France but their achieved with only modest gains due to the Franco-Italian Armistice on 24 June, but Germany signed an armistice (22 June: Second Armistice at Compiègne) with Marshal Philippe Pétain establishing Vichy France, that retained control over southern France and colonies. This decision angered the Fascist regime. In summer 1940, Mussolini ordered the bombing of Mandatory Palestine and the conquest of British Somaliland. In September, he ordered the invasion of Egypt; despite initial success, Italian forces were soon driven back by the British in Operation Compass. Hitler had to intervene with the sending of the Afrika Korps of General Erwin Rommel, that was the mainstay in the North African campaign. Although Rommel himself was officially under Italian command.

On 28 October, Mussolini launched an attack on Greece. However, the Greeks not only proved a more capable opponent successfully repelling the initial attack, but also managed to push the Italians back to Albania. Hitler came to Mussolini's aid by attacking the Greeks through the Balkans. The Balkans Campaign had as result the dissolution of Yugoslavia and Greece's defeat. Italy gained south Slovenia, Dalmatia, Montenegro and established the puppet states of Croatia and Hellenic State. By 1942, it was faltering as its economy failed to adapt to the conditions of war and Italian cities were being heavily bombed by the Allies. Also, despite the Axis advances, the campaign in North Africa began to fail in late 1942. The complete collapse came after the decisive defeat at El Alamein.

By 1943, Italy was losing on every front. Half of the Italian forces fighting in the Soviet Union had been destroyed, the African campaign had failed, the Balkans remained unstable, and Italians wanted an end to the war. In July 1943, the Allies invaded Sicily in an effort to knock Italy out of the war and establish a foothold in Europe. On 25 July, Mussolini was ousted by the Great Council of Fascism and arrested by order of King Victor Emmanuel III, who appointed General Pietro Badoglio as new Prime Minister. Badoglio stripped away the final elements of Fascist rule by banning the National Fascist Party, then signed the Armistice of Cassibile and the instrument of surrender on 29 September.

Donald Detwiler notes that "Italy's entrance into the war showed very early that her military strength was only a hollow shell. Italy's military failures against France, Greece, Yugoslavia and in the African Theatres of war shook Italy's new prestige mightily." Historians have long debated why Italy's military and its Fascist regime were so remarkably ineffective at an activity – war – that was central to their identity. MacGregor Knox says the explanation, "was first and foremost a failure of Italy's military culture and military institutions." Norman Polmar and Thomas B. Allen argue that "the Regia Aeronautica failed to perform effectively in modern conflict." James Sadkovich gives the most charitable interpretation of Italian failures, blaming inferior equipment, overextension, and inter-service rivalries. Its forces had "more than their share of handicaps."

==== Civil War, Allied advance, and Liberation ====
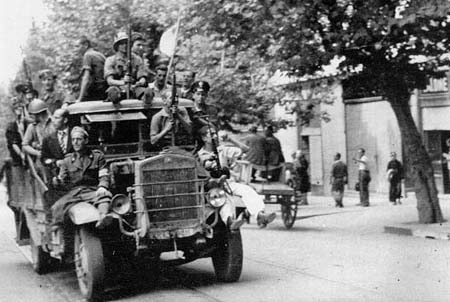
Insurgents celebrating the liberation of Naples, after the Four days of Naples (27–30 September 1943)

Soon after being ousted, Mussolini was rescued by a German commando in Operation Eiche ("Oak"). The Germans brought Mussolini to northern Italy where he set up a Fascist puppet state, the Italian Social Republic (RSI). Meanwhile, the Allies advanced in southern Italy. In September 1943, Naples rose against the occupying German forces. The Allies organized some royalist Italian troops into the Italian Co-Belligerent Army, while other troops continued to fight alongside Nazi Germany in the Esercito Nazionale Repubblicano, the National Republican Army. A large Italian resistance movement started a long guerrilla war against the German and Fascist forces, while clashes between the Fascist RSI Army and the Royalist Italian Co-Belligerent Army were rare. The Germans, often helped by Fascists, committed several atrocities against Italian civilians in occupied zones, such as the Ardeatine massacre and the Sant'Anna di Stazzema massacre. The Kingdom of Italy declared war on Nazi Germany on 13 October 1943; tensions between the Axis Powers and the Italian military were rising following the failure to defend Sicily.

On 4 June 1944, the German occupation of Rome came to an end as the Allies advanced. The final Allied victory over the Axis in Italy did not come until the spring offensive of 1945, after Allied troops had breached the Gothic Line, leading to the surrender of German and Fascist forces in Italy on 2 May shortly before Germany finally surrendered ending World War II in Europe on 8 May. It is estimated that between September 1943 and April 1945, some 60,000 Allied and 50,000 German soldiers died in Italy. (Note: In Alexander's Generals Blaxland quotes 59,151 Allied deaths between 3 September 1943 and 2 May 1945 as recorded at AFHQ and gives the breakdown between 20 nationalities: United States 20,442; United Kingdom, 18,737; France, Morocco, Algeria, Tunisia, Senegal and Belgium 5,241; Canada, 4,798; India, Pakistan, Nepal 4,078; Poland 2,028; New Zealand 1,688; Italy (excluding irregulars) 917; South Africa 800; Brazil 275; Greece 115; Jewish volunteers from the British Mandate in Palestine 32. In addition, 35 soldiers were killed by enemy action while serving with pioneer units from Botswana, Lesotho, Swaziland, Seychelles, Mauritius, Sri Lanka, Lebanon, Cyprus and the West Indies)

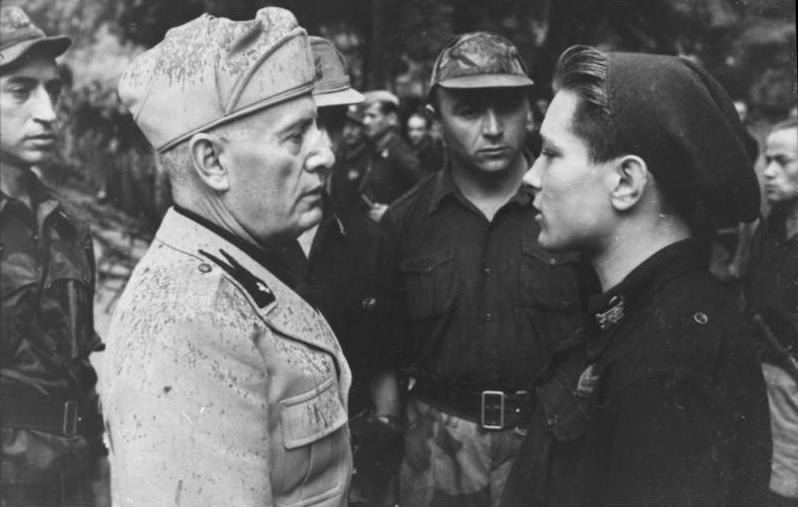
The head of the Italian Social Republic, Benito Mussolini, with a soldier in 1944

During World War II, Italian war crimes included extrajudicial killings and ethnic cleansing by the deportation of about 25,000 people, mainly Jews, Croats, and Slovenians, to the Italian concentration camps, such as Rab, Gonars, Monigo, Renicci di Anghiari and elsewhere. Yugoslav Partisans perpetrated their own crimes against the local ethnic Italian population during and after the war, including the foibe massacres. In Italy and Yugoslavia, unlike in Germany, few war crimes were prosecuted.

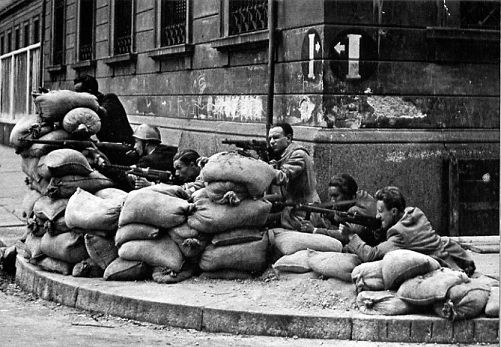
Italian anti-fascist partisans in Milan during the liberation of Italy, April 1945

On 25 April 1945 the National Liberation Committee for Northern Italy proclaimed a general insurrection in all the territories still occupied by the Nazis, indicating to all the partisan forces active in Northern Italy that were part of the Volunteer Corps of Freedom to attack the fascist and German garrisons by imposing the surrender, days before the arrival of the Allied troops; at the same time, the National Liberation Committee for Northern Italy personally issued legislative decrees, assuming power "in the name of the Italian people and as a delegate of the Italian Government", establishing among other things the death sentence for all fascist hierarchs, Today the event is commemorated in Italy every 25 April by the Liberation Day, National Day introduced on 22 April 1946, which celebrates the liberation of the country from fascism.

Mussolini was captured on 27 April 1945, by communist Italian partisans near the Swiss border as he tried to escape Italy. On the next day, he was executed for high treason. Days later on 2 May 1945, the German forces in Italy surrendered. On 9 June 1944, Badoglio was replaced as prime minister by anti-fascist leader Ivanoe Bonomi. In June 1945 Bonomi was in turn replaced by Ferruccio Parri, who in turn gave way to Alcide De Gasperi on 4 December 1945. Finally, De Gasperi supervised the transition to a republic following the abdication of Victor Emmanuel III on 9 May 1946, the one-month-long reign of his son Umberto II ("King of May") and the Constitutional Referendum that abolished the monarchy; De Gasperi briefly became acting head of state as well as prime minister on 18 June 1946, but ceded the former role to Provisional President Enrico de Nicola ten days later.

=== Anti-fascism against Mussolini's regime ===
Flag of Arditi del Popolo, an axe cutting a fasces. Arditi del Popolo was a militant anti-fascist group founded in 1921.

In Italy, Mussolini's Fascist regime used the term anti-fascist to describe its opponents. Mussolini's secret police was officially known as the Organization for Vigilance and Repression of Anti-Fascism (OVRA). During the 1920s, anti-fascists, many of them from the labor movement, fought against the violent Blackshirts and against the rise of the fascist leader Benito Mussolini. After the Italian Socialist Party (PSI) signed a pacification pact with Mussolini and his Fasces of Combat on 3 August 1921, and trade unions adopted a legalist and pacified strategy, members of the workers' movement who disagreed with this strategy formed Arditi del Popolo.

The Italian General Confederation of Labour (CGL) and the PSI refused to officially recognize the anti-fascist militia and maintained a non-violent, legalist strategy, while the Communist Party of Italy (PCd'I) ordered its members to quit the organization. The PCd'I organized some militant groups, but their actions were relatively minor. The Italian anarchist Severino Di Giovanni, who exiled himself to Argentina following the 1922 March on Rome, organized several bombings against the Italian fascist community. The Italian liberal anti-fascist Benedetto Croce wrote his Manifesto of the Anti-Fascist Intellectuals, which was published in 1925. Other notable Italian liberal anti-fascists around that time were Piero Gobetti and Carlo Rosselli.

Concentrazione Antifascista Italiana (English: Italian Anti-Fascist Concentration), officially known as Concentrazione d'Azione Antifascista (Anti-Fascist Action Concentration), was an Italian coalition of Anti-Fascist groups which existed from 1927 to 1934, trying to promote and to coordinate expatriate actions to fight fascism in Italy; they published a propaganda paper entitled La Libertà. Giustizia e Libertà (English: Justice and Freedom) was an Italian anti-fascist resistance movement, active from 1929 to 1945 which shared a belief in active, effective opposition to fascism, compared to the older Italian anti-fascist parties. Giustizia e Libertà also made the international community aware of the realities of fascism in Italy, thanks to the work of Gaetano Salvemini.

Between 1920 and 1943, several anti-fascist movements were active among the Slovenes and Croats in the territories annexed to Italy after World War I, known as the Julian March. The most influential was the militant insurgent organization TIGR, which carried out numerous sabotages, as well as attacks on representatives of the Fascist Party and the military. Most of the underground structure of the organization was discovered and dismantled by the OVRA in 1940 and 1941, and after June 1941 most of its former activists joined the Slovene Partisans. Many members of the Italian resistance left their homes and went to live in the mountains, fighting against Italian fascists and German Nazi soldiers during the Italian Civil War. Many cities in Italy, including Turin, Naples and Milan, were freed by anti-fascist uprisings.

=== End of the Kingdom of Italy (1946) ===
==== 1946 Italian institutional referendum ====
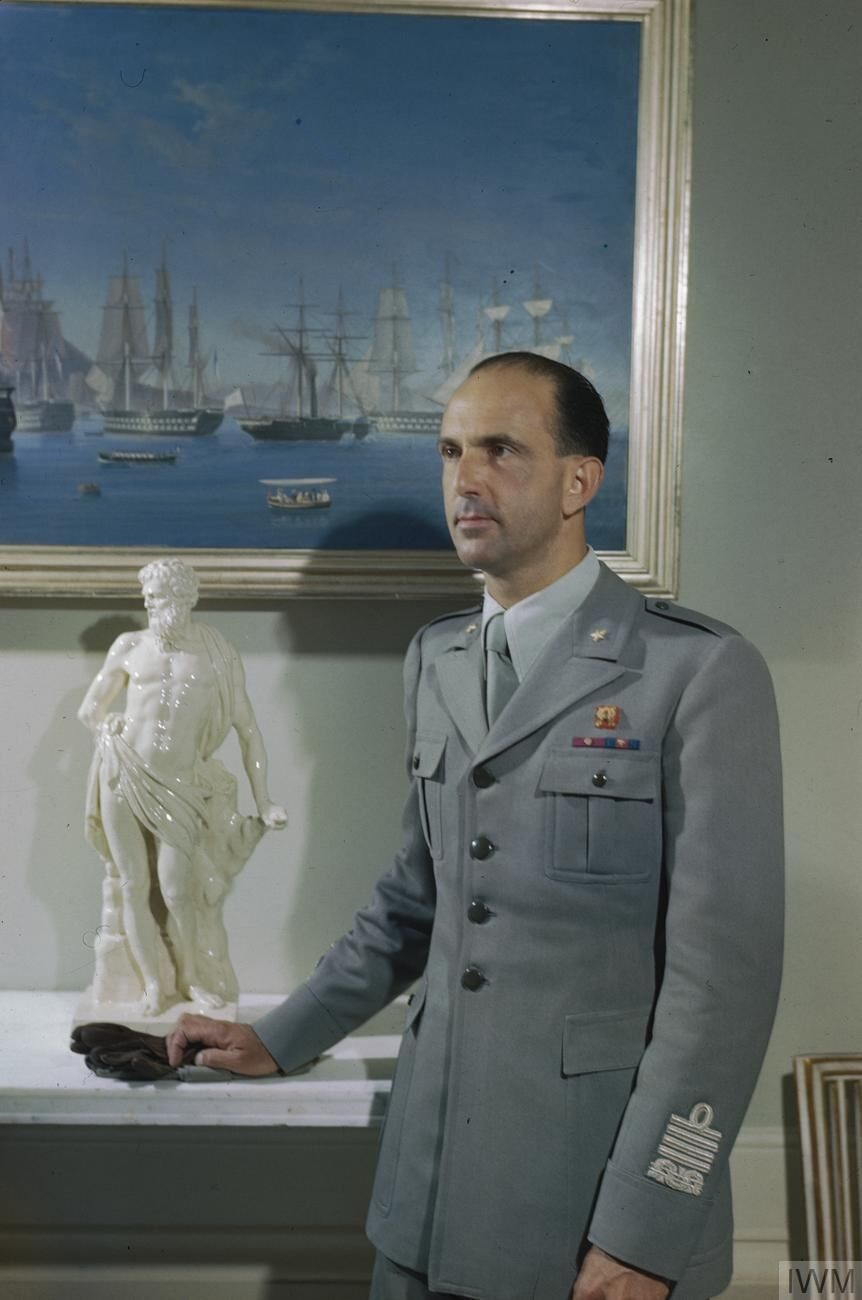
Umberto II, the last king of Italy

Much like Japan and Germany, the aftermath of World War II left Italy with a destroyed economy, a divided society, and anger against the monarchy for its endorsement of the Fascist regime for the previous twenty years.

Even before the rise of the Fascists, the monarchy was seen to have performed poorly, with society extremely divided between the wealthy North and poor South. World War I resulted in Italy making few gains and was seen as what fostered the rise of Fascism. These frustrations contributed to a revival of the Italian republican movement. By the spring of 1944, it was obvious Victor Emmanuel was too tainted by his previous support for Mussolini to have any further role. He transferred his constitutional powers to Crown Prince Umberto, whom he named Lieutenant General of the Realm and de facto regent.

Results of the 1946 referendum

Victor Emmanuel III nominally remained King until shortly before the 1946 Italian institutional referendum on whether to remain a monarchy or become a republic. On 9 May 1946, he abdicated in favour of the Crown Prince, who then ascended as King Umberto II. However, on 2 June 1946, the republican side won 54% of the vote, and Italy officially became a republic, a day celebrated since as Festa della Repubblica. This was the first time that Italian women voted at the national level, and the second time overall considering the local elections that were held a few months earlier in some cities.

The table of results shows some relevant differences in the different parts of Italy. The peninsula seemed to be drastically cut into two as if there were two different homogeneous countries: the North for the republic (with 66.2%); the South for the monarchy (with 63.8%). Some monarchist groups claimed that there was manipulation by northern republicans, socialists and communists. Others argued that Italy was still too chaotic in 1946 to have an accurate referendum.

Umberto II decided to leave Italy on 13 June to avoid the clashes between monarchists and republicans, already manifested in bloody events in various Italian cities, for fear they could extend throughout the country. He went into exile in Portugal. From 1 January 1948, with the entry into force of the Constitution of the Italian Republic, the male descendants of Umberto II of Savoy were banned from entering Italy; the provision being repealed in 2002.

==== Aftermath ====
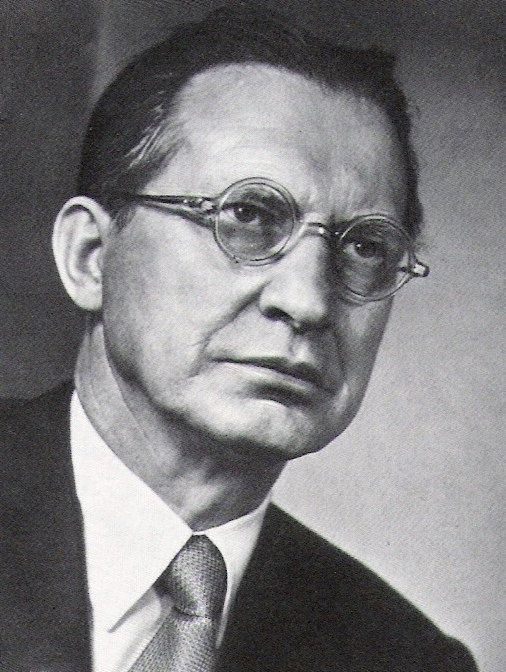
Alcide De Gasperi, first republican Prime Minister of Italy and one of the founding fathers of the European Union

The Republican Constitution, resulting from the work of a Constituent Assembly formed by the representatives of all the anti-fascist forces that contributed to the defeat of Nazi and Fascist forces during the liberation of Italy, came into force on 1 January 1948.

Under the Treaty of Peace with Italy, 1947, Istria, Kvarner, most of the Julian March as well as the Dalmatian city of Zara was annexed by Yugoslavia causing the Istrian-Dalmatian exodus, which led to the emigration from 1943 to 1960 of between 230,000 and 350,000 local ethnic Italians (Istrian Italians and Dalmatian Italians), the others being ethnic Slovenians, ethnic Croatians, and ethnic Istro-Romanians, choosing to maintain Italian citizenship. Later, the Free Territory of Trieste was divided between the two states. Italy also lost its colonial possessions, formally ending the Italian Empire. The Italian border that applies today has existed since 1975, when Trieste was formally re-annexed to Italy.

Fears of a possible Communist takeover proved crucial for the first universal suffrage electoral outcome on 18 April 1948, when the Christian Democrats, under the leadership of Alcide De Gasperi, obtained a landslide victory. Consequently, in 1949 Italy became a member of NATO. The Marshall Plan helped to revive the Italian economy which, until the late 1960s, enjoyed a period of sustained economic growth commonly called the "Economic Miracle". In the 1950s, Italy became one of the six founding countries of the European Communities, following the 1952 establishment of the European Coal and Steel Community, and subsequent 1958 creations of the European Economic Community and European Atomic Energy Community. In 1993, the former two of these were incorporated into the European Union.

== Maps of progressive territorial formation of the Kingdom of Italy ==
For its greatest extent see: Italian Empire

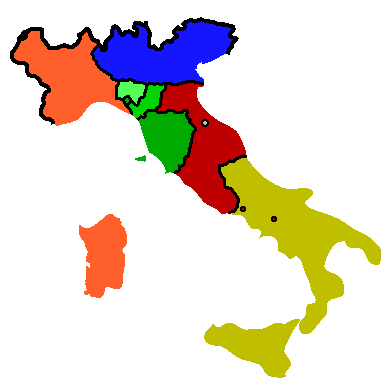
The Italian States in 1859, on the eve of the Second Italian War of Independence

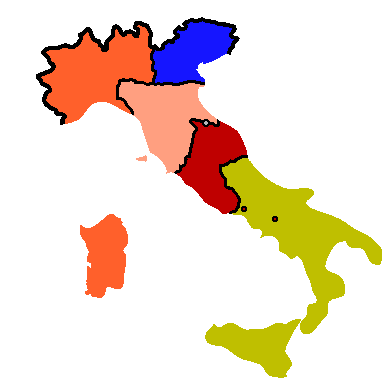
The Kingdom of Sardinia in 1860, after the annexation of Lombardy and before the annexation of the United Provinces of Central Italy (Note: Provisional confederation between the pro-Savoy governments of the ex-Grand Duchy of Tuscany, Emilian duchies and Pontifical Romagna, specially created to favor their union with the Kingdom of Sardinia.)

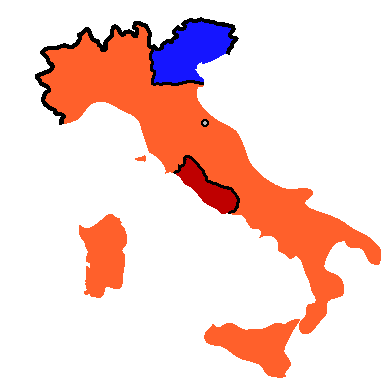
The Kingdom of Italy in 1861, after the Expedition of the Thousand

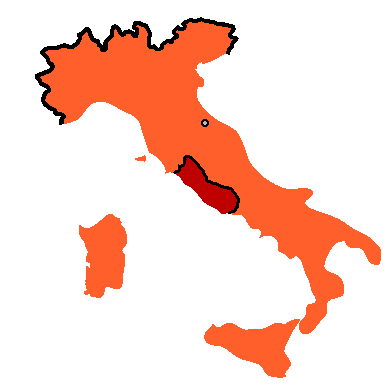
The Kingdom of Italy in 1866, after the Third Italian War of Independence

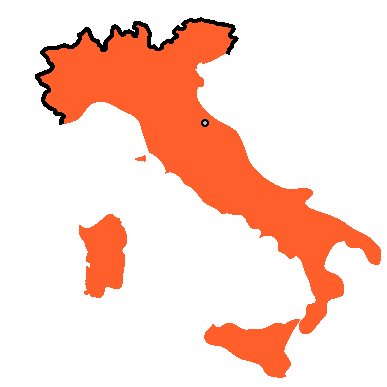
The Kingdom of Italy after the conquest of Rome and Lazio (Capture of Rome, 20 September 1870)

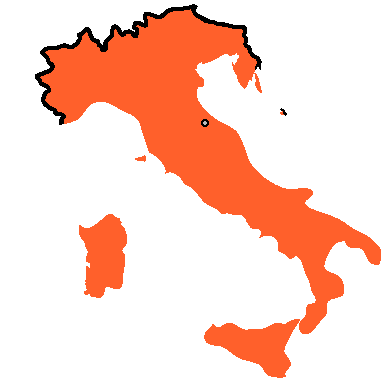
The Kingdom of Italy in 1924, after World War I, comprising the Venices Tridentina and Giulia, the city of Fiume and the Dalmatian city of Zara

The Kingdom of Italy in 1943, during World War II, with the annexation of territories from France and Yugoslavia. The territories annexed by the latter are the area constituting the province of Ljubljana, the area merged with the province of Fiume and the areas making up the Governorate of Dalmatia.

Legend

- Kingdom of Sardinia (Kingdom of Italy from 1861)
- Kingdom of the Two Sicilies
- Papal States
- Kingdom of Lombardy–Venetia

- Grand Duchy of Tuscany
- Duchy of Modena and Reggio
- Duchy of Parma and Piacenza
- United Provinces of Central Italy

== Chronology of national coats of arms ==
Coat of arms used from 1861 to 1870

Coat of arms used from 1870 to 1890

Coat of arms used from 1890 to 1927

Coat of arms used from 1927 to 1929

Coat of arms used from 1929 to 1944

Coat of arms used from 1944 to 1946

== See also ==
- Unification of Italy
- Proclamation of the Kingdom of Italy
- History of the Kingdom of Italy (1861–1946)
- House of Savoy
- List of prime ministers of Italy
- Military history of Italy during World War I
- Military history of Italy during World War II
- Roman question
- Italian Empire

== Bibliography ==
- Ashley, Susan A. Making Liberalism Work: The Italian Experience, 1860–1914 (2003) excerpt and text search
- Baran'ski, Zygmunt G. & Rebecca J. West (2001). The Cambridge companion to modern Italian culture, Cambridge: Cambridge University Press, ISBN 0-521-55034-3.
- Barclay, Glen St. J. 1973. The Rise and Fall of the New Roman Empire. London: Sidgwick & Jackson.
- Bocca, Giorgio (2001). Storia dell'Italia partigiana settembre 1943 - maggio 1945 (in Italian). Mondadori. p. 39. ISBN 978-88-0717-2441 – via Google Books.
- Bosworth, Richard J. B. 1983. Italy and the Approach of the First World War. London: The Macmillan
- Bosworth, Richard J. B. 2007. Mussolini's Italy: Life Under the Fascist Dictatorship, 1915–1945 excerpt and text search
- Clark, Martin. 1996. Modern Italy: 1871–1995. (2nd ed. Longman)
- Coppa, Frank J. (1970). "Economic and Ethical Liberalism in Conflict: The extraordinary liberalism of Giovanni Giolitti", Journal of Modern History (1970) 42#2 pp 191–215 JSTOR 1905941
- Coppa, Frank J. (1971). Planning, Protectionism, and Politics in Liberal Italy: Economics and Politics in the Giolittian Age. Archived from the original on 24 June 2013 – via Questia.
- Davis, John A., ed. 2000, Italy in the Nineteenth Century: 1796–1900 Oxford University Press. online edition Archived 29 June 2011 at the Wayback Machine
- de Grazia, Victoria. 1981. The Culture of Consent: Mass Organizations of Leisure in Fascist Italy.
- de Grazia, Victoria. 1993. How Fascism Ruled Women: Italy, 1922–1945 excerpt and text search
- De Grand, Alexander J. (2001). The hunchback's tailor: Giovanni Giolitti and liberal Italy from the challenge of mass politics to the rise of fascism, 1882–1922, Greenwood. online edition Archived 5 February 2008 at the Wayback Machine; excerpt and text search
- Duggan, Christopher (2008). The Force of Destiny: A History of Italy Since 1796, Houghton Mifflin Harcourt, text search
- Ganapini, Luigi (2010) [1999]. La repubblica delle camicie nere. I combattenti, i politici, gli amministratori, i socializzatori (in Italian) (2a ed.). Milano: Garzanti. ISBN 978-88-11-69417-5.
- Gentile, Emilio. 2003. The Struggle For Modernity: Nationalism, Futurism and Fascism. Westport, CT: Praeger.
- Gilmour, David. 2011. The Pursuit of Italy: A History of a Land, Its Regions, and Their Peoples excerpt and text search
- Hughes, Robert. 2011. Rome: A Cultural, Visual, and Personal History
- Kertzer, David I. (2014). The Pope and Mussolini: The Secret History of Pius XI and the Rise of Fascism in Europe. Oxford University Press. ISBN 9780198716167.
- Killinger, Charles L. (2002). The history of Italy, Westport (CT): Greenwood Press, text search
- Mack Smith, Denis. 1997. Modern Italy; A Political History. Ann Arbor: The University of Michigan Press.
- Mack Smith, Denis (1983). Mussolini: A Biography. New York: Vintage Books. ISBN 978-0394716589.
- Manenti, Luca G. (2013), «Evviva Umberto, Margherita, l'Italia, Roma!». L'irredentismo triestino e Casa Savoia, in Diacronie. Studi di Storia Contemporanea, n. 16, 8/ «Evviva Umberto, Margherita, l'Italia, Roma!». L’irredentismo triestino e Casa Savoia
- Meldi, Diego (2015). La repubblica di Salò. Gherardo Casini Editore. ISBN 978-88-6410-068-5.
- Pauley, Bruce F. 2003. Hitler, Stalin, and Mussolini: Totalitarianism in the Twentieth Century. Wheeling: Harlan Davidson
- Pollard, John F. 1985. The Vatican and Italian Fascism, 1929–32. Cambridge, USA: Cambridge University Press.
- Salomone, A. William. 1945. Italy in the Giolittian Era: Italian Democracy in the Making, 1900–1914
- Sarti, Roland (2004). Italy: A Reference Guide from the Renaissance to the Present, New York: Facts on File text search
- Sarti, Roland. 1974. The Ax Within: Italian Fascism in Action. New York: New Viewpoints.
- Seton-Watson, Christopher (1967). Italy from Liberalism to Fascism, 1870–1925, New York: Taylor & Francis, text search
- Stockings, Craig; Hancock, Eleanor (2013). Swastika over the Acropolis: Re-interpreting the Nazi Invasion of Greece in World War II. Leiden: BRILL. ISBN 978-90-04-25459-6.
- Thayer, John A. 1964. Italy and the Great War. Madison and Milwaukee: University of Wisconsin Press.

=== Historiography ===
- Albanese, Giulia. "Reconsidering the March on Rome," European History Quarterly (2012) 42#3 pp 403–421.
- Ferrari, Paolo. "The Memory And Historiography Of The First World War In Italy" Comillas Journal of International Relations (2015) #2 pp 117–126 ISSN 2386-5776 doi:10.14422/cir.i02.y2015.009
- Keserich, Charles. "The Fiftieth Year of the" March on Rome": Recent Interpretations of Fascism." History Teacher (1972) 6#1 pp: 135–142 JSTOR 492632.
- Pergher, Roberta. "An Italian War? War and Nation in the Italian Historiography of the First World War" Journal of Modern History (Dec 2018) 90#4
- Renzi, William A. In the Shadow of the Sword: Italy's Neutrality and Entrance Into the Great War, 1914–1915 (1987).

=== Primary sources ===
- Mussolini, Benito. 1935. Fascism: Doctrine and Institutions. Rome: Ardita Publishers.
