= Suona la tromba =

Secular hymn composed by Giuseppe Verdi

Inno populare
- Secular hymn by Giuseppe Verdi
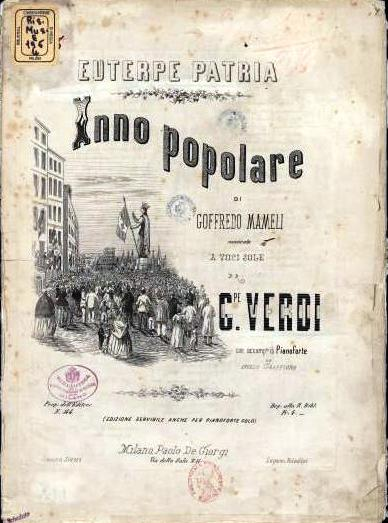
- Cover of the score, published in 1868 in the series Euterpe patria
- Text: by Goffredo Mameli
- Language: Italian
- Composed: 1848
- Published: 1868
- Scoring: three part men's chorus

"Suona la tromba" ("The Trumpet Sounds") or "Inno popolare" ("Hymn of the People") is a secular hymn composed by Giuseppe Verdi in 1848 to a text by the Italian poet and patriot Goffredo Mameli. The work's title comes from the opening line of Mameli's poem. It has sometimes been referred to as "Grido di guerra".

== Background ==
The piece begins with the lines: "Suona la tromba — ondeggiano / le insegne gialle e nere." ("The trumpet sounds, the yellow and black flags are waving."), a reference to the yellow and black flag of the Austrian Empire. It was commissioned by Giuseppe Mazzini as a new battle hymn for the Revolution of 1848 when Italian nationalists sought independence from the Austrian Empire which controlled large portions of northern Italy. He persuaded Verdi to compose the music for it when Verdi visited Milan in May 1848, shortly after the Austrians had been driven from the city and other parts of Lombardy. Mazzini commissioned the text from Mameli in June, asking him for a poem that would become the Italian "Marseillaise" and quoted Verdi's wish that the new anthem would "make the people forget both the poet and the composer". Mameli finished the poem in late August, and Mazzini immediately sent it to Verdi who was living and working in Paris at the time. Verdi sent the finished work, composed for a three part male chorus without accompaniment, to Mazzini on 18 October 1848. In the accompanying letter Verdi wrote:

I send you the hymn, and even if it is a bit late, I hope it will arrive in time. I have tried to be as popular and easy as I can be. Make use of it as you see fit: even burn it if you do not think it worthy.

== Publication and performance history ==
In his letter to Mazzini of 18 October 1848, Verdi had recommended that if Mazzini wished to publish the hymn, he give it to Carlo Pozzi, an affiliate of Verdi's publisher Casa Ricordi. However, before the music reached Mazzini, the Austrian Empire had regained its lost territories and Milan's musical life was once again under the control of the Austrian censors. The numerous patriotic songs and anthems that had been published by Casa Ricordi and Casa Lucca during the brief revolution were withdrawn, with some of those editions destroyed. Mazzini did not try to have "Suona la tromba" officially published at that time, although in late 1848 a few copies of it were printed and circulated in Florence by the short-lived Associazione Nazionale per la Costituente Italiana (National Association for the Italian Constitution). Mameli died in 1849 at the age of 22. His earlier poem "Il Canto degli Italiani" (The Song of the Italians) later became the Italian National anthem.

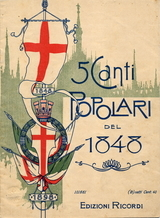
Cover of the 1898 Ricordi anthology, 5 Canti Popolari del 1848

Verdi's score for "Suona la tromba" languished in the Casa Ricordi archives until 1865 when Mazzini gave it to the Milanese music publisher Paolo De Giorgi who brought it out as the first in a series of patriotic songs entitled Euterpe Patria. Verdi's hymn is sometimes referred to as "Euterpe Patria", although the series also included songs by several other composers. As a courtesy, De Giorgi had also asked for Verdi's approval, but Verdi was not happy with the idea and Francesco Maria Piave, acting on his behalf, tried to stop the publication.

However, his 1848 letter to Mazzini in which he had written "Make use of it as you see fit" was interpreted as having given Mazzini the right to control the hymn's publication. De Giorgi then made the gesture of offering to abandon the project if Verdi agreed to write a new hymn to inaugurate a monument to the Battle of Legnano, knowing full well that Verdi would refuse. The publication of "Suona la tromba" went ahead and came with a piano accompaniment arranged by Angelo Graffigna. De Georgi also published an "economy edition" of the work, under the title "Grido di guerra" (War cry).

There have been several subsequent arrangements of the hymn, some with orchestration, each tailored to popular tastes of the time. Ricordi published the score arranged for chorus and orchestra in 1898 and also included the hymn in 5 canti popolari del 1848, an anthology of patriotic songs published to commemorate the 50th anniversary of the 1848 uprisings. Nevertheless, "Suona la tromba" remained a relatively obscure piece until 1996. Students at the Milan Conservatory had unearthed the 1865 De Giorgi score in the conservatory's library, and it was performed by the City of Milan Chamber Choir in a broadcast by Rai 2 television on 7 February 1996. In 2011, the 150th anniversary of the unification of Italy, there were multiple performances of the work in commemorative concerts, and it was recorded by the La Scala Chamber Orchestra and Chorus for the CD Musica del Risorgimento.

The critical edition of the score, edited and annotated by Roberta Montemorra Marvin, was published by University of Chicago Press in 2007. In 2013, the Accademia Nazionale d’Arte Antica e Moderna published what is claimed to be the sole surviving copy of the score printed in Florence in 1848 and found in 2011 in the private archive of the Italian pianist and conductor Antonello Palazzolo.
