= E. A. Mario =

Italian musician and writer (1884–1961)

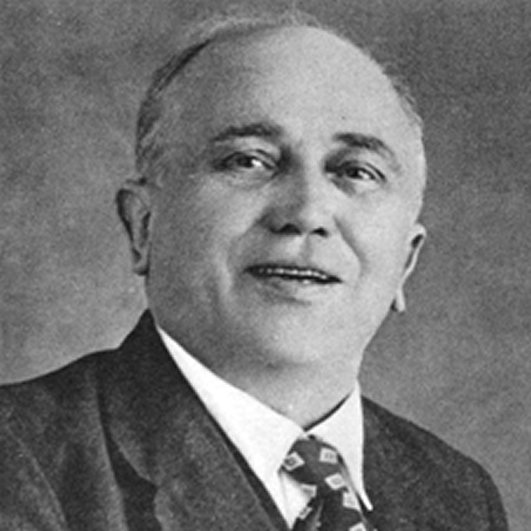

Background information
- Born: Giovanni Gaeta; 1884
- Died: 24 June 1961 (aged 76–77)

Giovanni Gaeta (1884 – 24 June 1961) was the real name of the Italian poet, writer and musician better known as E. A. Mario. He took the E of his assumed name from the initial letter of the pseudonym Ermes under which he wrote for the newspaper Il Ventesimo; the A came from Alessandro, the paper's chief editor; and Mario was the name of its Polish director.

Gaeta composed and wrote the lyrics to more than 2,000 works in Italian and Neapolitan. In 1918, he wrote La leggenda del Piave, which at the birth of the Italian Republic was a candidate for the Italian national anthem. His other famous works include Santa Lucia luntana, Balocchi e profumi, Vipera, Rose rosse, and O' Paese dò sole.

== Biography ==
The future E. A. Mario was born to a family of modest means in the Vicaria quarter of Pellezzano, Salerno. His father, Michele Gaeta, was a barber and his mother, Maria della Monica, a housewife. The back of his father's barbershop served as the family's cramped living quarters, housing in addition to Gaeta, his mother and father, brother Ciccillo, and sisters Agata and Anna. Three aunts and an uncle occupied two further small rooms. He married Adelina, the daughter of the famous actress Leonilde Gaglianone, after a short three-month engagement. The couple were to have three daughters: Delia, Italia and Bruna.

On 9 February 1916, Gaeta was initiated in the regular Scottish Rite Masonic Lodge Unione e Lavoro in Naples. In Gaeta's youth he admired the performances of the great Neapolitan actor, poet and playwright Eduardo Scarpetta. Gaeta collaborated greatly with the leading Neapolitan publisher, Ferdinand Bideri, who also produced the works of Gabriele d'Annunzio.

Gaeta was destined never to become wealthy, forced by his wife's serious illness to sell the rights to all of his songs to a publishing house in Milan, from which he was to receive only a small percentage. He died in 1961 at the age of 77 on 24 June, the name day of his saint. His wife had died some months earlier.

== See also ==
- Music of Naples
