= Canto degli italiani =

National anthem of Italy

English: Song of the Italians
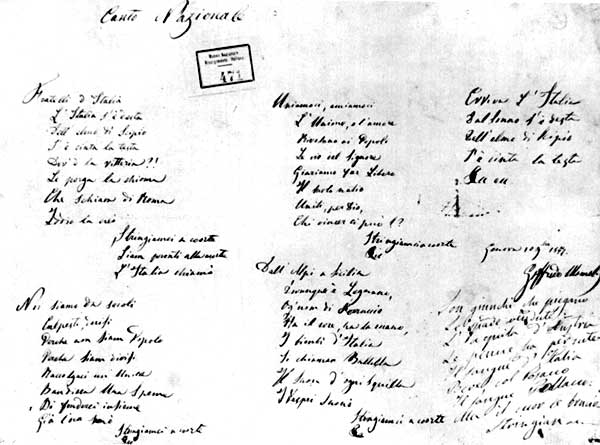
- Holographic copy of 1847 of "Il Canto degli italiani"
- National anthem of Italy
- Also known as: Inno di Mameli (English: Mameli's Hymn); Fratelli d'Italia (English: Brothers of Italy)
- Lyrics: Goffredo Mameli, 1847
- Music: Michele Novaro, 1847
- Adopted: 12 October 1946 (de facto); 1950 (by Trust Territory of Somaliland); 4 December 2017 (de jure)
- Relinquished: 1960 (by Trust Territory of Somaliland)
- Preceded by: "Marcia Reale" (1861–1946)

Audio sample
- Italian Navy Band instrumental version (one verse and chorus; 2006): file; help

"Il Canto degli italiani" (Note: Italian pronunciation: [il ˈkanto deʎʎ itaˈljaːni]; transl. "The Song of Italians".) is a patriotic song written by Goffredo Mameli and set to music by Michele Novaro in 1847, currently used as the national anthem of Italy. It is known among Italians as the "Inno di Mameli" (Note: Italian pronunciation: [ˈinno di maˈmɛːli]; transl. "Mameli's Hymn".)—after the author of the lyrics—or as "Fratelli d'Italia" (Note: Italian pronunciation: [fraˈtɛlli diˈtaːlja]; transl. "Brothers of Italy".)—from the song's opening line. The piece, in 4/4 time signature and B-flat major key, has six strophes, and a refrain sung after each. The sixth group of verses, almost never performed, recalls the text of the first strophe.

The song was popular during the unification of Italy and the following decades. However, after the proclamation of the Kingdom of Italy in 1861, the republican and Jacobin connotations of "Fratelli d'Italia" were difficult to reconcile with the new state's monarchic constitution. The kingdom instead chose "Marcia Reale"—the House of Savoy's official anthem—composed by order of King Charles Albert of Sardinia in 1831.

After World War II, Italy became a republic. On 12 October 1946, it chose "Il Canto degli italiani" as a provisional national anthem. The song would retain this role as de facto anthem of the Italian Republic, and after many unsuccessful attempts, gained de jure status on 4 December 2017.

== History ==
=== Origins ===
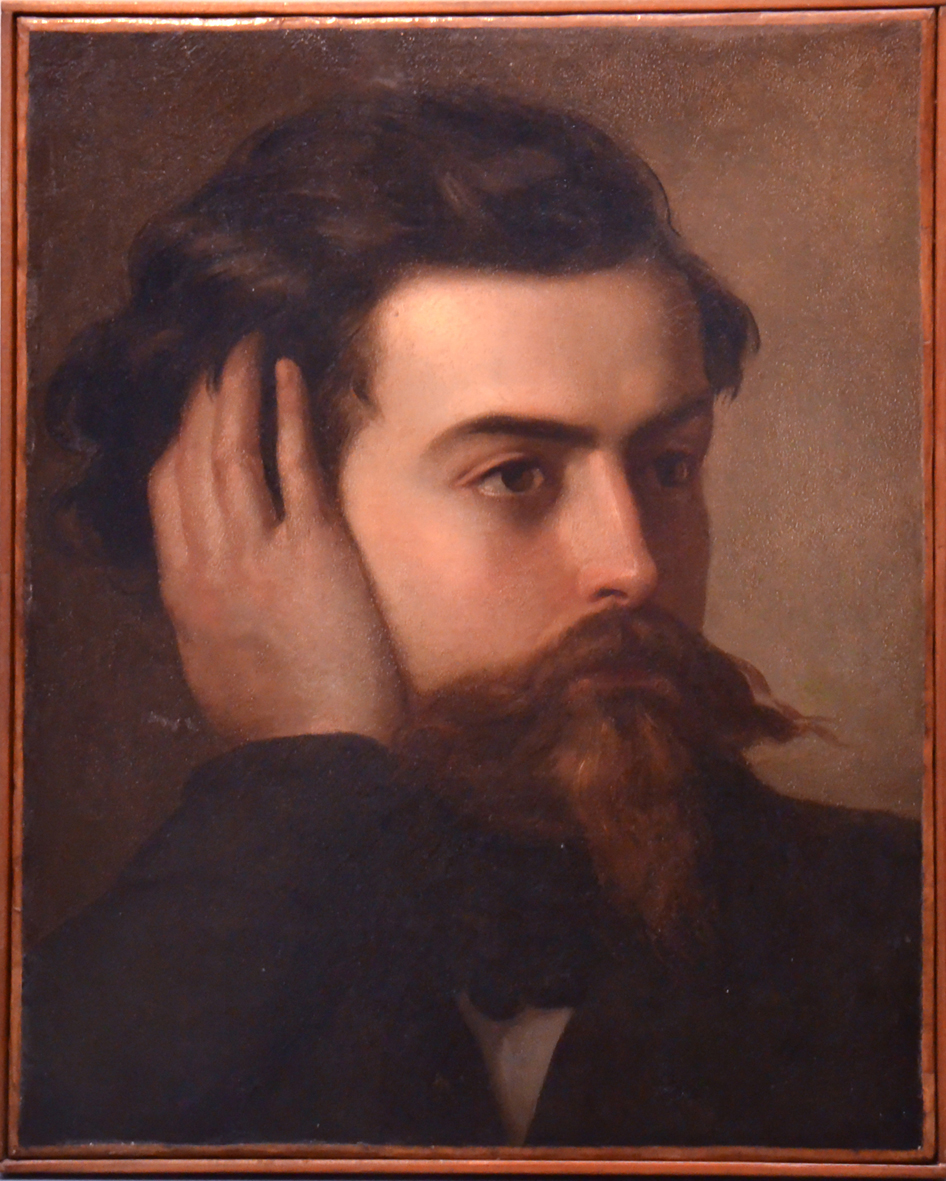
Goffredo Mameli (1827–1849), lyricist

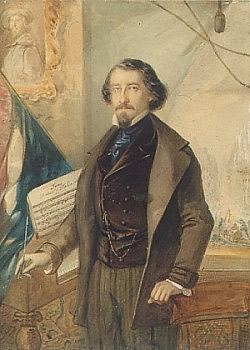
Michele Novaro (1818–1885), musical composer

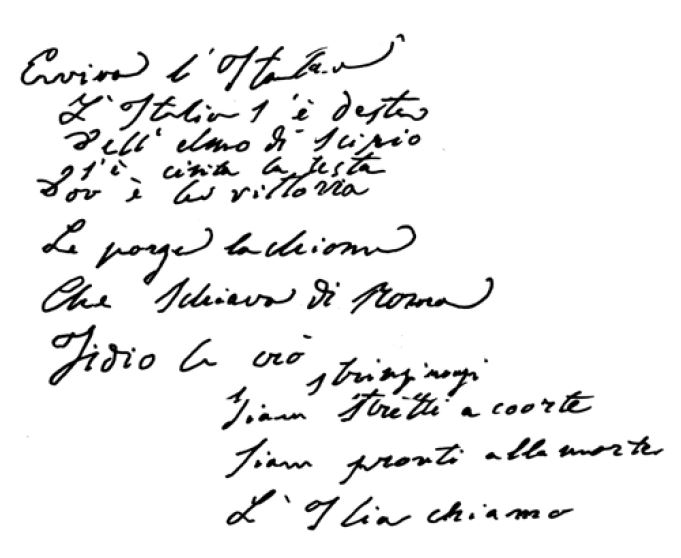
Holographic draft of 1847 by Goffredo Mameli of the first strophe and the refrain of "Il Canto degli italiani"

The text of "Il Canto degli italiani" was written by Goffredo Mameli, a young Genoese patriot inspired by the mass mobilizations that would lead to the revolutions of 1848 and the First Italian War of Independence. Sources differ on the precise date of the text's drafting: according to some scholars, Mameli wrote the text on 10 September 1847, while others date the composition's birth to two days prior—8 September. After discarding all extant music, on 10 November 1847 Mameli sent the text to Turin and the Genoese composer Michele Novaro, who lived at the time with the activist Lorenzo Valerio.

The poem captured Novaro, and he decided to set it to music on 24 November 1847. Thirty years later, the patriot and poet Anton Giulio Barrili recalled Novaro's description of the event thus:

Mi posi al cembalo, coi versi di Goffredo sul leggio, e strimpellavo, assassinavo colle dita convulse quel povero strumento, sempre cogli occhi all'inno, mettendo giù frasi melodiche, l'un sull'altra, ma lungi le mille miglia dall'idea che potessero adattarsi a quelle parole. Mi alzai scontento di me; mi trattenni ancora un po' in casa Valerio, ma sempre con quei versi davanti agli occhi della mente. Vidi che non-c'era rimedio, presi congedo e corsi a casa. Là, senza neppure levarmi il cappello, mi buttai al pianoforte.

Mi tornò alla memoria il motivo strimpellato in casa Valerio: lo scrissi su d'un foglio di carta, il primo che mi venne alle mani: nella mia agitazione rovesciai la lucerna sul cembalo e, per conseguenza, anche sul povero foglio; fu questo l'originale dell'inno Fratelli d'Italia.

I placed myself at the harpsichord, with Goffredo's verses on the lectern, and strummed away, murdering the poor instrument with my shaking hands. I kept my eyes on the hymn as I set down melodic phrases, one after the other, but felt a thousand miles distant from the idea I could adapt the words. I stood up disgruntled with myself; I stayed a little longer in the Valerio house, but always those verses hung in my mind's eye. I saw that there was no remedy, took leave, and ran home. There, without even taking off my hat, I threw myself at the piano.

The motif strummed in the Valerio house came back to me: I wrote it on a sheet of paper, the first that came to my hands: in my agitation I upset the lamp on the harpsichord and, consequently, also on the poor sheet; this was the origin of the Fratelli d'Italia

Cover of a 1915 album of patriotic music: the personification of Italy, wearing Scipio's helmet and waving the Italian flag, leads the Bersaglieri

Mameli held Republican and Jacobin sympathies and supported the French Revolution credo liberté, égalité, fraternité. The text of "Il Canto degli italiani" drew inspiration from the French national anthem, "La Marseillaise". For example, "Stringiamci a coorte" recalls the "La Marseillaise" verse Formez vos bataillons ('Form your battalions').

In the original version of the text, the first line of the first verse read "Hurray Italy", but Mameli changed it to "Fratelli d'Italia", likely at Novaro's suggestion. Novaro, after receiving the manuscript, added a rebellious "Sì!" ('Yes!') at the end of the final refrain.

Another verse in the first draft was dedicated to Italian women, but was eliminated by Mameli before the official debut. It read: "Tessete o fanciulle / bandiere e coccarde / fan l'alme gagliarde / l'invito d'amor". (Note: Italian pronunciation: [tesˈseːte o fanˈtʃulle], [banˈdjɛːr(e) e kkokˈkarde], [fan ˈlalme ɡaʎˈʎarde], [liɱˈviːto daˈmor] transl. Weave maidens / flags and cockades (Note: This alludes to the flag of Italy and to the cockade of Italy, both symbols of the battle for the unification of Italy.) / they make souls gallant / the invitation of love.)

=== Debut ===
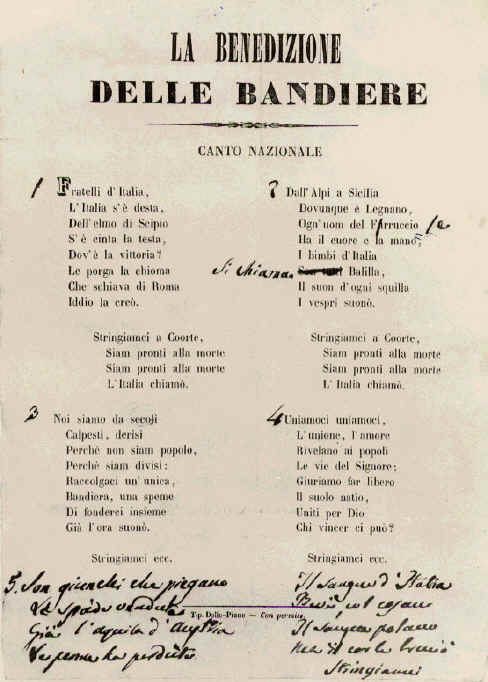
The first printed copy of the hymn, by the Delle Piane printers of Genoa, on looseleaf, was distributed on 10 December 1847 to demonstrators in Oregina. Mameli then added in pen the fifth strophe of the hymn, censored by the Savoy government as too anti-Austrian.

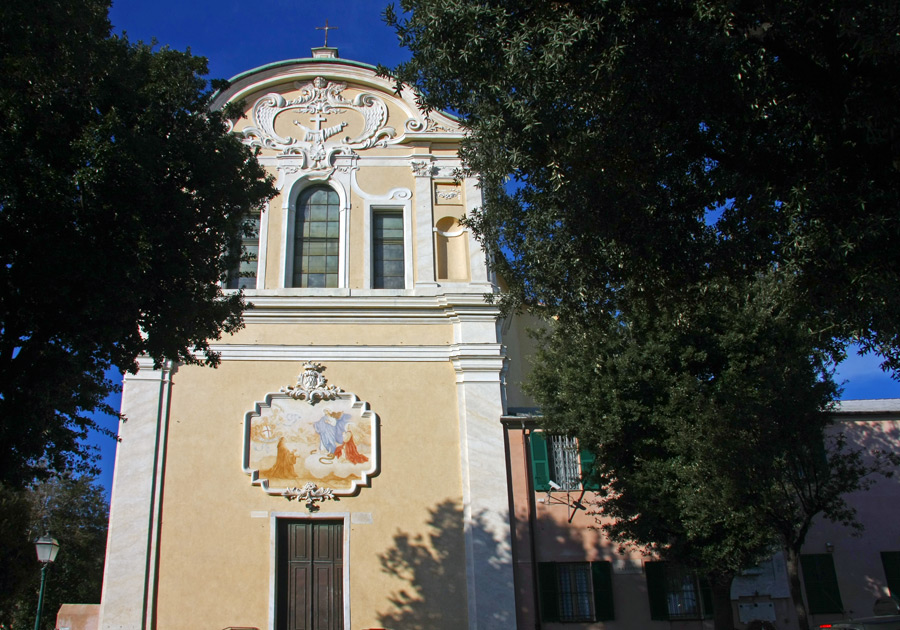
The Santuario della Nostra Signora di Loreto, before which the "Il Canto degli italiani" made its public debut

On 10 December 1847, a demonstration before the Santuario della Nostra Signora di Loreto in Oregina, Genoa, was officially dedicated to the 101st anniversary of the Portoria quarter's popular rebellion during the War of the Austrian Succession, which had expulsed the Austrians from the city. In fact, it was an excuse to protest against foreign occupations in Italy and induce Charles Albert of Sardinia to embrace the Italian cause of liberty and of unity.

On this occasion, the flag of Italy was shown and Filarmonica Sestrese, the municipal band of Sestri Ponente, played Mameli's anthem for 30,000 patriots who had come to Genoa from other parts of Italy for the event. This event is believed to be the song's first public performance, but there may have been a previous public rendition in Genoa on 9 November 1847, of which the original documentation was lost.

That performance would have been by the Filarmonica Voltrese founded by Goffredo's brother Nicola Mameli, and used a first draft of "Il Canto degli italiani" that differs from the final version. As its author was infamously Mazzinian, the piece was forbidden by the Piedmontese police until March 1848. Its execution was also forbidden by the Austrian police, which also pursued its singing interpretation — considered a political crime — until their empire's dissolution. On 18 December 1847, the Pisan newspaper L'Italia wrote how the song evoked public spirits:

... For many evenings numerous youths have come together in the Accademia filodrammatici to sing a hymn of Mameli, set to music by the maestro Novaro. Poetry … is full of fire, music fully corresponds to it …

— Newspaper L'Italia, 18 December 1847

Two of Mameli's autographed manuscripts have survived to the 21st century: the first draft, with Mameli's hand annotations, at the Mazzinian Institute of Genoa; and the letter, from Mameli on 10 November 1847, to Novaro, at the Museo del Risorgimento in Turin.

Novaro's autographed manuscript to the publisher Francesco Lucca is located in the Ricordi Historical Archive. The later Istituto Mazziniano sheet lacks the final strophe ("Son giunchi che piegano…") for fear of censorship. These leaflets were to be distributed at the 10 December demonstration in Genoa. The hymn was also printed on leaflets in Genoa, by the printer Casamara.

=== The following decades ===
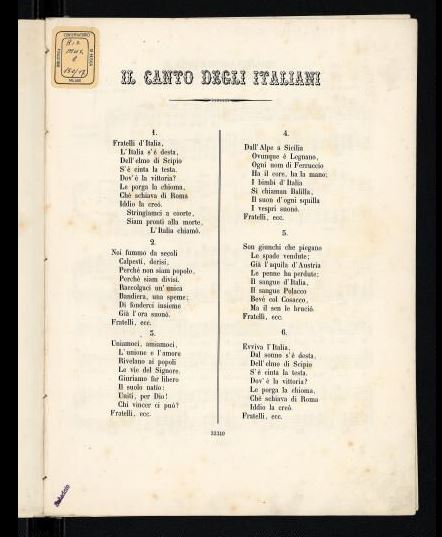
Edition of 1860, printed by Tito I Ricordi

"Il Canto degli italiani" debuted with a few months left to the revolutions of 1848. Shortly before the promulgation of the Statuto Albertino, the constitution that Charles Albert of Sardinia conceded to the Kingdom of Sardinia on 4 March 1848, political gatherings of more than ten people had become legal, and songs like "Il Canto degli italiani" could spread by word of mouth. Patriots from the 10 December demonstration spread the hymn all over the Italian Peninsula. It became popular among the Italian people and the ranks of the Republican volunteers. The hymn was commonly sung in most parts of Italy during demonstrations, protests and revolts as a symbol of the unification.

The Savoyard authorities censored the fifth strophe to preserve diplomatic relations with the Austrians; however, after the declaration of war against the Austrian Empire and the beginning of the First Italian War of Independence in 1848, the soldiers and the Savoy military bands performed it so frequently that King Charles Albert was forced to withdraw all censorship. The rebels sang "Il Canto degli italiani" during the Five Days of Milan and at Charles Albert of Piedmont-Sardinia's promulgation of the Statuto Albertino. Volunteers for the short-lived Roman Republic sang it, and Giuseppe Garibaldi hummed and whistled it during the defense of Rome and the flight to Venice.

=== Between the unification and World War I ===
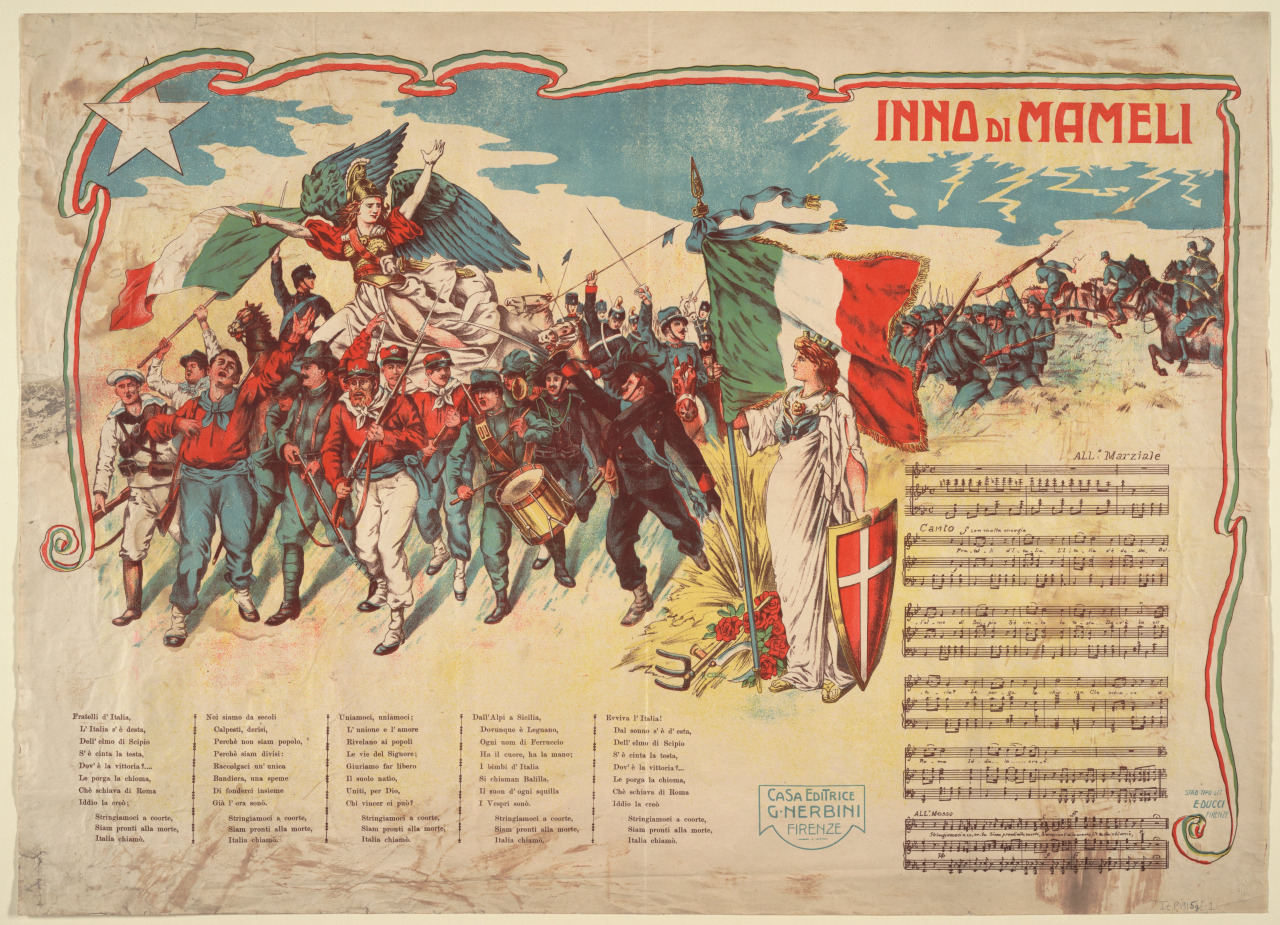
Propaganda poster from the 1910s with the "Il Canto degli italiani" score

In the 1860, the corps of volunteers led by Giuseppe Garibaldi used to sing the hymn in the battles against the Bourbons in Sicily and southern Italy during the Expedition of the Thousand. Giuseppe Verdi, in his Inno delle nazioni ('Hymn of the Nations'), composed for the London International Exhibition of 1862, chose "Il Canto degli italiani" to represent Italy, putting it beside "God Save the Queen" and "La Marseillaise".

After the proclamation of the Kingdom of Italy in 1861, the "Royal March", composed in 1831, was chosen as the national anthem of unified Italy. "Il Canto degli italiani" had politically radical content, with its strong republican and Jacobin connotations, and did not combine well with the monarchical conclusion to the unification of Italy. Mameli's creed was, however, more historical than political, and socialist and anarchist circles also regarded "Il Canto degli italiani" as too conservative.

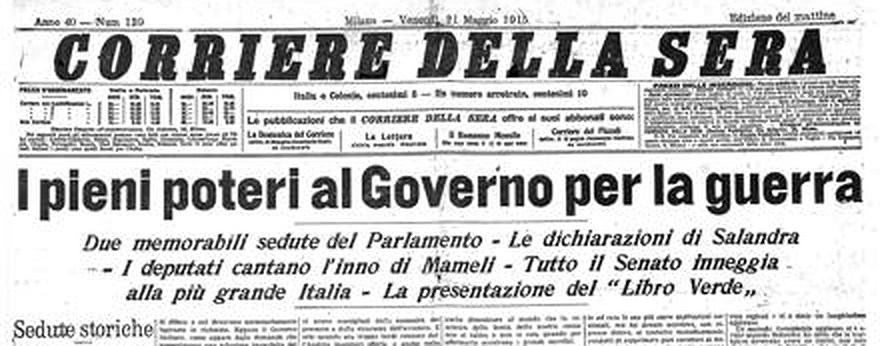
Front page of the Corriere della Sera of 21 May 1915: parliamentary deputies acclaimed the government's assumption of war powers with the Mameli-Novaro anthem.

The song was one of the most common songs during the Third Italian War of Independence in 1866. At the Capture of Rome on 20 September 1870, the last step in Italian unification, choirs sang it together with "La bella Gigogin" and the "Royal March"; and "Il Canto degli italiani" received bersaglieri fanfare.

After the end of the Italian unification, "Il Canto degli italiani" was taught in schools, and remained popular among Italians. However, other musical pieces connected to the political and social situation of the time, such as the "Inno dei lavoratori" ('Hymn of the Workers') or "Goodbye to Lugano", addressed daily problems. These partly obscured the popularity of reunification hymns.

"Fratelli d'Italia", thanks to references to patriotism and armed struggle, returned to success during the Italo-Turkish War, whereby it joined "A Tripoli"; and in the trenches of World War I. Italian irredentism of that time found a symbol in "Il Canto degli italiani"; although, in the years following, in the patriotic ambit, musical pieces of greater military style such as "La Leggenda del Piave", the "Canzone del Grappa" or "La campana di San Giusto" would have been preferred over it. Shortly after Italy entered World War I, on 25 July 1915, Arturo Toscanini performed "Il Canto degli italiani" at an interventionist demonstration.

=== During fascism ===
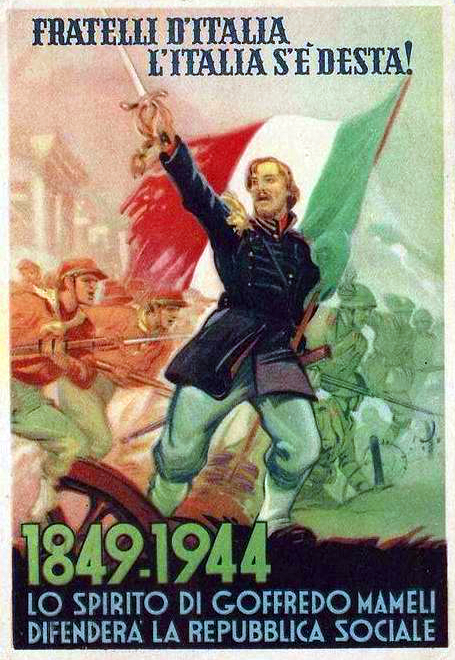
"Il Canto degli italiani" remembered together with the unification of Italy on a propaganda poster of Benito Mussolini's Italian Social Republic

Fascist chants, such as "Giovinezza", became important symbols, after the 1922 March on Rome. Although not official, they were widely disseminated, publicized, and taught in schools. Non-fascist melodies including "Il Canto degli italiani" were discouraged.

In 1932, National Fascist Party secretary Achille Starace decided to prohibit musical pieces that did not sing to Benito Mussolini and—more generally—did not link to fascism. "Subversive" songs (i.e., those of the anarchist or socialist type), such as the anthem of the workers or "The Internationale", and non-sympathetic foreign nations' official anthems, such as "La Marseillaise", were banned. Sympathetic regimes' anthems, such as the Nazi hymn "Horst-Wessel-Lied" and the Francoist song "Cara al Sol", were contrariwise encouraged. After the 1929 Lateran Treaty with the Holy See, anti-clerical passages were also banned.

In the spirit of this directive, some songs were resized, such as "La Leggenda del Piave", which was sung almost exclusively during the National Unity and Armed Forces Day every 4 November. The chants used during the Italian unification were tolerated, however: "Il Canto degli italiani", which was forbidden in official ceremonies, received a certain condescension on particular occasions.

During World War II, regime musicians released fascist pieces via radio, but few songs spontaneously arose among the population. Songs like "A primavera viene il bello", "Battaglioni M", "Vincere!" and "Camerata Richard" were common. The most famous spontaneous song was "Sul ponte di Perati".

After the armistice of 8 September 1943, the Italian government provisionally adopted as a national anthem "La Leggenda del Piave", replacing the "Marcia Reale". Cooperation with the fascist dictatorship was now egg on the monarchy's face; a song that recalled the Italian victory in World War I could infuse courage and hope to the Royal Italian Army troops who now fought against Mussolini's Social Republic and Nazi Germany.

"Fratelli d'Italia" resounded in Southern Italy (freed by the Allies) and in partisan-controlled areas to the north. "Il Canto degli italiani", in particular, had success in anti-fascist circles, where it joined partisan songs "Fischia il vento" and "Bella ciao". Some scholars believe that the success of the piece in anti-fascist circles then was decisive for its choice as provisional anthem of the Italian Republic.

Often, "Il Canto degli italiani" is wrongly referred to as the national anthem of the Italian Social Republic. However, Mussolini's Republic had no official anthem, playing "Il Canto degli italiani" and "Giovinezza" equally often at the ceremonies. "Il Canto degli italiani" retained value to the fascists only for propaganda.

Thus, Mameli's hymn was sung by both partisans and fascists.

=== From provisional to official anthem ===
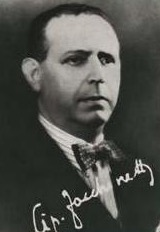
Cipriano Facchinetti

In 1945, at the end of the war, Arturo Toscanini directed a performance of Giuseppe Verdi's 1862 "Inno delle nazioni" in London, including "Il Canto degli italiani". However, even after the birth of the Italian Republic, "La Leggenda del Piave" remained the temporary national anthem.

For the new anthem, a debate arose. Possible options included "Va, pensiero" from Verdi's Nabucco; a completely new piece; "Il Canto degli italiani"; the "Inno di Garibaldi"; and confirmation of "La Leggenda del Piave". The government then approved Republican War Minister Cipriano Facchinetti's proposal to adopt "Il Canto degli italiani" as provisional anthem.

"La Leggenda del Piave" thus served as national anthem until the Council of Ministers meeting on 12 October 1946, when Facchinetti officially announced the provisional anthem for the 4 November National Unity and Armed Forces Day celebrations. The press release stated:

… On the proposal of the Minister of War it was established that the oath of the Armed Forces to the Republic and to its Chief would be carried out on November 4th p.v. and that, temporarily, the anthem of Mameli is adopted as the national anthem …

— Cipriano Facchinetti

Facchinetti also declared that a draft decree would be proposed to confirm "Il Canto degli italiani" as the provisional national anthem of the newly formed Republic, but did not follow up on this promise. Instead, he proposed to formalize "Il Canto degli italiani" in the Constitution of Italy, then being drafted.

The Constitution, finished in 1948, determined the national flag, but did not establish a national anthem or emblem; the latter was adopted by legislative decree on 5 May. A draft constitutional law prepared immediately afterwards sought to insert, after discussion of the national flag, the sentence "The Anthem of the Republic is the 'Il Canto degli italiani'". This law stalled as well.

"Il Canto degli italiani" nonetheless garnered success among the Italian diaspora: "Fratelli d'Italia" scores are sold in Little Italies across the Anglosphere, and "Il Canto degli italiani" is often played on more or less official occasions in North and South America. In particular, it was the "soundtrack" of post-WWII fundraisers in the Americas for the Italian population left devastated by the conflict.

Between 1999 and 2006, President of the Republic Carlo Azeglio Ciampi, began to revive "Il Canto degli italiani" as a national symbol of Italy. Ciampi declared that:

… It is a hymn that, when you listen to it, makes you vibrate inside; it is a song of freedom of a people that, united, rises again after centuries of divisions, of humiliations …

— Carlo Azeglio Ciampi

In August 2016, a bill was submitted to the Constitutional Affairs Committee of the Chamber of Deputies to make "Canto degli italiani" Italy's national anthem, and passed out of committee in July 2017. On 15 December 2017, on Gazzetta Ufficiale law nº 181 of 4 December 2017, was published after passing both houses of Parliament, and the law came into force on 30 December 2017.

=== Modern changes ===
In 2025, President Sergio Mattarella signed a decree clarifying that the final "Sì!" ('Yes!') at the end of the chorus is no longer to be sung during the Italian national anthem, as it did not appear in the original official text written by Mameli and instead was added by Novaro.

== Lyrics ==
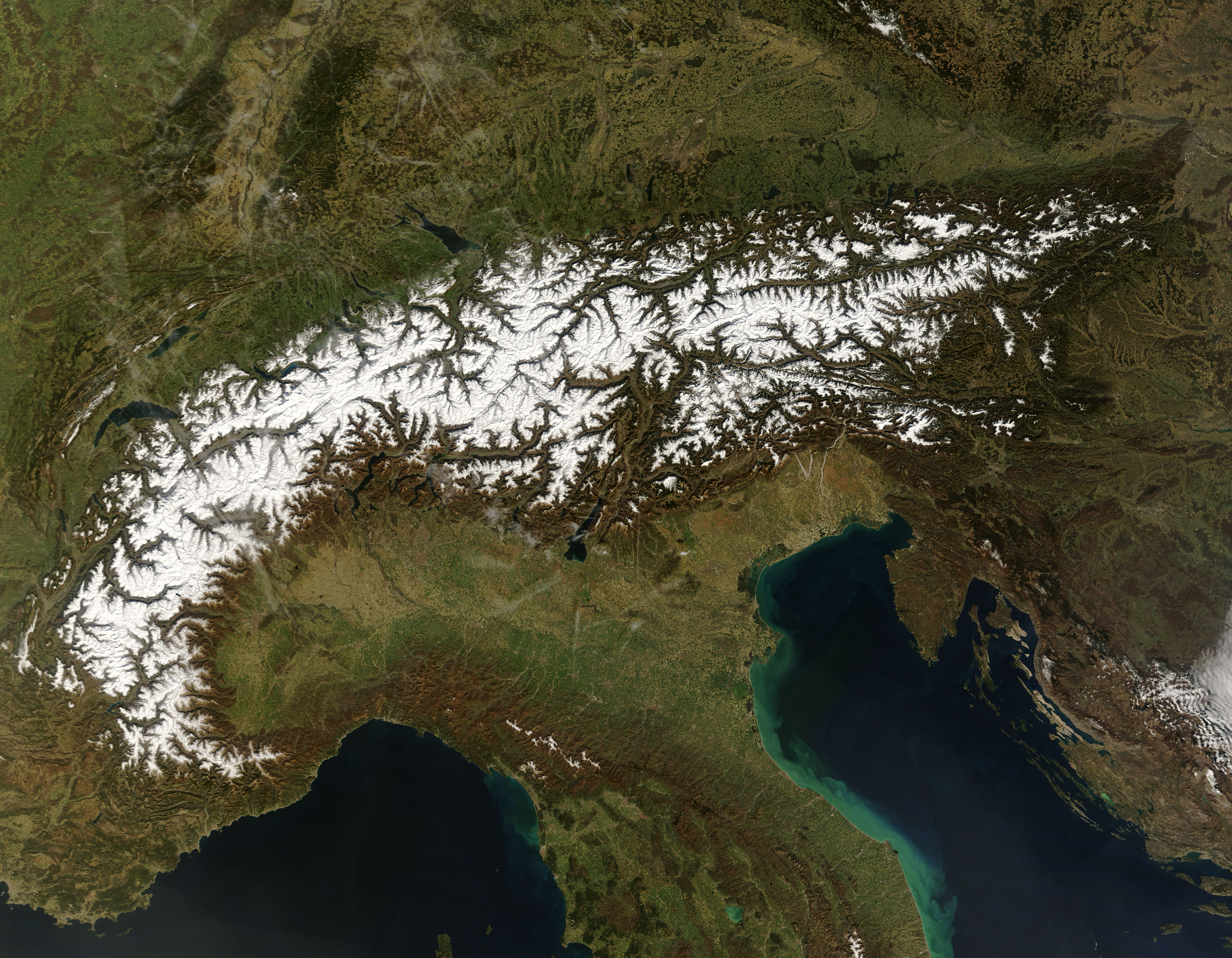
The Alps

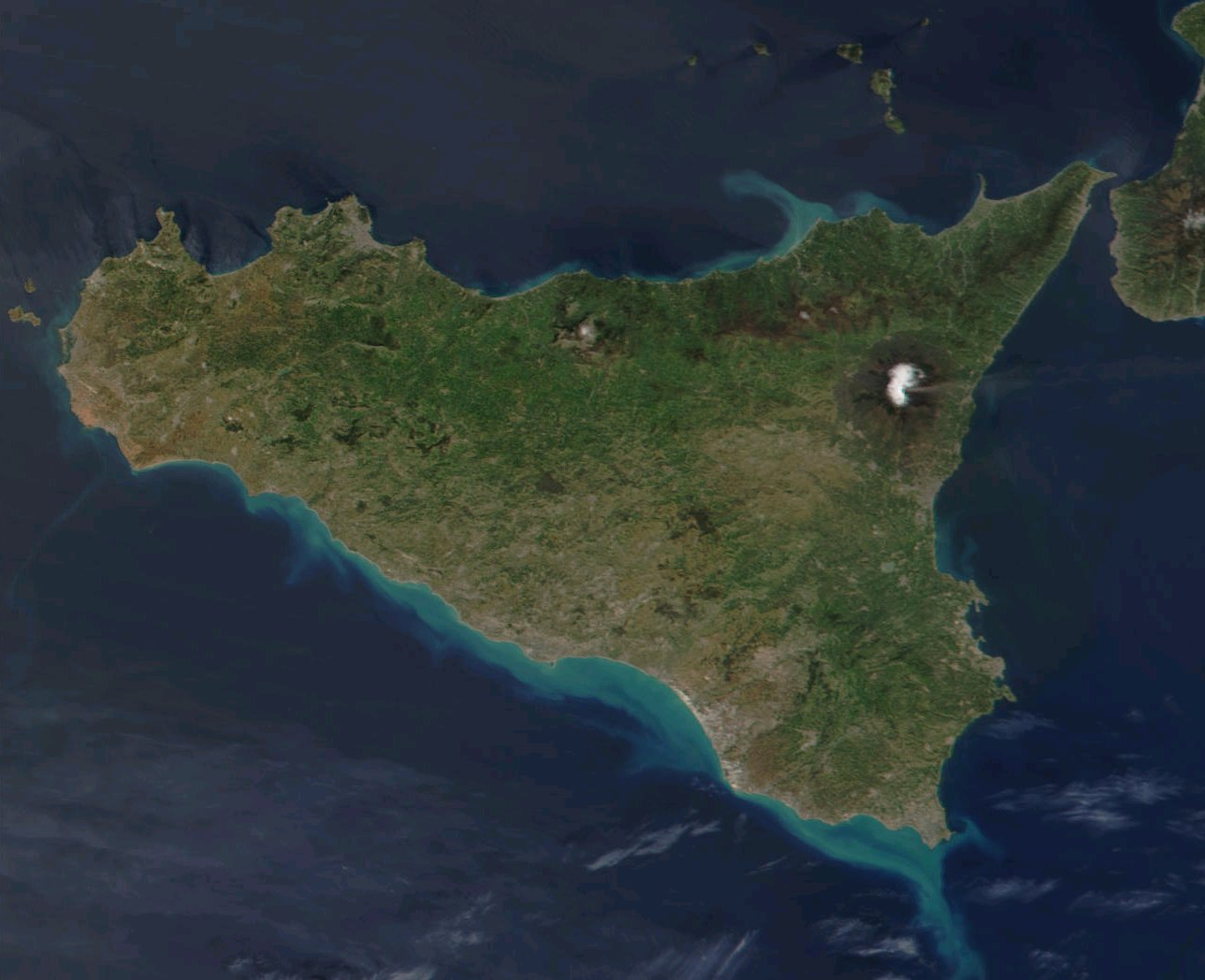
Sicily

Version sung in 1943 and subsequently adopted by the Italian Social Republic

Version sung by Mario Del Monaco in 1961

Full sung version

U.S. Navy Band instrumental version (one verse and chorus)

The first strophe presents a personification of Italy who is ready to war to become free, and shall be victorious as Rome was in ancient times, "wearing" the helmet of Scipio Africanus who defeated Hannibal at the final battle of the Second Punic War. It also alludes to the ancient Roman custom that slaves cut their hair short as a sign of servitude: hence the Goddess of Victory must cut her hair and enslave herself to Rome (to make Italy victorious).

In the second strophe, the author complains that Italy has been a divided nation for a long time, and calls for unity. In this strophe Mameli uses three poetic and archaic words: calpesti (modern Italian: calpestati), speme (modern speranza), raccolgaci (modern ci raccolga).

The third strophe is an invocation to God to protect the loving union of the Italians struggling to unify their nation once and for all. The fourth strophe recalls popular heroic figures and moments of the Italian fight for independence: the battle of Legnano, the defence of Florence led by Ferruccio during the Italian Wars, the riot started in Genoa by Balilla, and the Sicilian Vespers. The fifth strophe unequivocally marks Habsburg Austria as the Italian cause's primary enemy. It also links the Polish quest for independence to the Italian one.

The sixth and final verse, almost never performed, is missing in Mameli's original draft but appears in his second manuscript. However, it was omitted in the first printed editions of the text on the leaflet. The verse joyfully announces the unity of Italy and goes on to close the song with the same six lines that conclude the initial verse, thus giving the poem a circular structure.

Italian lyrics

Fratelli d'Italia,
l'Italia s'è desta,
dell'elmo di Scipio
s'è cinta la testa.
Dov'è la Vittoria?
Le porga la chioma,
ché schiava di Roma
Iddio la creò.

(ripetere la prima strofa)

Coro:
𝄆 Stringiamci a coorte,
siam pronti alla morte.
Siam pronti alla morte,
l'Italia chiamò. 𝄇

Noi fummo da secoli (Note: A different tense may be found: Noi siamo da secoli ('We have been for centuries').)
calpesti, derisi,
perché non siam popolo,
perché siam divisi.
Raccolgaci un'unica
bandiera, una speme:
di fonderci insieme
già l'ora suonò.

(ripetere la prima strofa)

Coro

Uniamoci, amiamoci, (Note: Occasionally written Uniamoci, uniamoci, especially in older publications.)
l'unione e l'amore
rivelano ai popoli
le vie del Signore.
Giuriamo far libero
il suolo natio:
uniti, per Dio,
chi vincer ci può?

(ripetere la prima strofa)

Coro

Dall'Alpi a Sicilia
dovunque è Legnano,
ogn'uom di Ferruccio
ha il core, ha la mano, (Note: Often written ha il core e la mano, especially in older publications.)
i bimbi d'Italia
si chiaman Balilla,
il suon d'ogni squilla
i Vespri suonò.

(ripetere la prima strofa)

Coro

Son giunchi che piegano
le spade vendute:
già l'Aquila d'Austria
le penne ha perdute.
Il sangue d'Italia,
il sangue Polacco,
bevé, col cosacco,
ma il cor le bruciò. (Note: Occasionally written ma il sen le bruciò ('but it burnt its breast'), especially in older publications.)

(ripetere la prima strofa)

Coro

Evviva l'Italia,
dal sonno s'è desta,
dell'elmo di Scipio
s'è cinta la testa.
Dov'è la vittoria?!
Le porga la chioma,
ché schiava di Roma
Iddio la creò.

(ripetere la prima strofa)

Coro

IPA transcription as sung (Note: See Help:IPA/Italian and Italian phonology.)

[fraˈtɛl.li diˈtaː.lja |]
[liˈtaː.lja ˌsɛ‿dˈde.sta |]
[delˈlel.mo di‿ʃˈʃiː.pjo]
[ˌsɛ‿tˈt͡ʃin.ta la ˈtɛ.sta ǁ]
[doˈvɛ‿l.la vitˈtɔː.rja |]
[le ˈpɔr.ɡa la ˈkjɔː.ma |]
[ke ˈskjaː.va di ˈroː.ma]
[idˈdiː.o la kreˈɔ ǁ]

([riˈpeː.te.re la ˈpriː.ma ˈstrɔː.fa])

[ˈkɔː.ro]:
𝄆 [strinˈd͡ʒan.t͡ʃ‿a‿k.koˈor.te |]
[ˌsjam‿ˈpron.ti̯‿al.la ˈmɔr.te ǁ]
[ˌsjam‿ˈpron.ti̯‿al.la ˈmɔr.te |]
[liˈtaː.lja kjaˈmɔ ǁ] 𝄇

[ˌnoi̯‿ˈfum.mo da(‿s.)ˈsɛː.ko.li]
[kalˈpe.sti | deˈriː.zi |]
[perˈke‿n.non ˌsjam‿ˈpɔː.po.lo |]
[perˈke‿sˌsjan‿diˈviː.zi ǁ]
[rakˈkɔl.ɡa.t͡ʃ‿uˈnuː.ni.ka]
[banˈdjɛ.ra(‿)u.na ˈspɛː.me |]
[di ˈfon.der.t͡ʃ(i)‿inˈsjɛː.me]
[ˌd͡ʒa‿lˈloː.ra swoˈnɔ ǁ]

([riˈpeː.te.re la ˈpriː.ma ˈstrɔː.fa])

[ˈkɔː.ro]

[uˈnjaː.mo.t͡ʃi | aˈmjaː.mo.t͡ʃi |]
[luˈnjoːn‿e‿l.laˈmoː.re]
[riˈveː.la.no ai̯ ˈpɔː.po.li]
[le ˈviː.e del siɲˈɲoː.re ǁ]
[d͡ʒuˈrjaː.mo ˌfar‿ˈliː.be.ro]
[il ˈswɔː.lo naˈtiː.o |]
[uˈniː.ti | per ˈdiː.o |]
[ki‿vˈvin.t͡ʃer t͡ʃi ˈpwɔ ǁ]

([riˈpeː.te.re la ˈpriː.ma ˈstrɔː.fa])

[ˈkɔː.ro]

[dalˈlal.pi̯‿a‿s.siˈt͡ʃiː.lja]
[doˈvuŋ.kw(e)‿ˌɛ‿l.leɲˈɲaː.no |]
[oɲˈɲwɔn‿di ferˈrut.t͡ʃo]
[ˌa‿i̯l ˈkɔː.re | ˌa‿l.la ˈmaː.no |]
[i ˈbim.bi diˈtaː.lja]
[si ˈkjaː.mam baˈlil.la |]
[il ˈswɔn ˌdoɲ.ɲi‿ˈskwil.la]
[i ˈvɛ.spri swoˈnɔ ǁ]

([riˈpeː.te.re la ˈpriː.ma ˈstrɔː.fa])

[ˈkɔː.ro]

[ˌson‿ˈd͡ʒuŋ.ki ke‿pˈpjɛː.ɡa.no]
[le ˈspaː.de venˈduː.te |]
[ˌd͡ʒa‿lˈlaː.kwi.la ˈdau̯.strja]
[le ˈpen.ne ˌa‿p.perˈduː.te ǁ]
[il ˈsaŋ.ɡwe diˈtaː.lja |]
[il ˈsaŋ.ɡwe poˈlak.ko |]
[beˈve | kol koˈzak.ko |]
[ma‿i̯l ˈkɔr le bruˈt͡ʃɔ ǁ]

([riˈpeː.te.re la ˈpriː.ma ˈstrɔː.fa])

[ˈkɔː.ro]

[evˈviː.va liˈtaː.lja |]
[dal ˈsɔn.no ˌsɛ‿dˈde.sta |]
[delˈlel.mo di‿ʃˈʃiː.pjo]
[ˌsɛ‿tˈt͡ʃin.ta la ˈtɛ.sta ǁ]
[doˈvɛ‿l.la vitˈtɔː.rja |]
[le ˈpɔr.ɡa la ˈkjɔː.ma |]
[ke ˈskjaː.va di ˈroː.ma]
[idˈdiː.o la kreˈɔ ǁ]

([riˈpeː.te.re la ˈpriː.ma ˈstrɔː.fa])

[ˈkɔː.ro]

English translation

Brothers of Italy, (Note: The Italians belong to a single people and are therefore "brothers".)
Italy has risen, (Note: "Italy has woken up"; that is, it is ready to fight.)
bound Scipio's helmet (Note: Scipio Africanus, winner of Battle of Zama, exemplifies the Roman Republic's recovery from defeats to valiantly and victoriously fight the enemy.)
Upon her head. (Note: Scipio's helmet, which Italy has now worn, is a symbol of the impending struggle against the Austrian Empire oppressor.)
Where is Victory? (Note: The goddess Victoria. For a long time, the goddess Vittoria was closely linked to ancient Rome, but now she is ready to dedicate herself to the new Italy for the series of wars that are necessary to drive the foreigners out of the national soil and unify the country.)
Let her bow down, (Note: Literally "tender her hair". Ancient Rome cut slaves' hair to distinguish them from free women, so Victoria must consign her hair to Italy and become a "slave" of it.)
Because as a slave of Rome (Note: Ancient Rome made, with its conquests, the goddess Victoria "its slave".)
God did create her. (Note: Ancient Rome was great by God's design.)

(repeat first stanza)

Chorus:
𝄆 Let us join in a cohort, (Note: Literally, "Let us tighten in a cohort," alluding to the combat unit of the ancient Roman army. This very strong military reference, reinforced by the appeal to the glory and military power of ancient Rome, once again calls all men to arms against the oppressor.)
we are ready for death.
We are ready for death,
Italy has called! 𝄇 (Note: This alludes to the call to arms of the Italian people with the aim of driving out the foreign ruler from national soil and unifying Italy, still divided into pre-unification states.)

We were for centuries
downtrodden, derided,
because we are not one people,
because we are divided. (Note: Mameli underlines the fact that Italy, understood as the Italian region, was not united. At the time (1847), in fact, it was still divided into nine states. For this reason, Italy had for centuries been often treated as a land of conquest.)
Let one flag, one hope
gather us all. (Note: Italy, still divided among the pre-unification states, will finally gather under a single flag, merging into one country.)
The hour has struck
for us to unite.

(repeat first stanza)

Chorus

Let us unite, let us love one another,
Union and love
Reveal to the peoples
The ways of the Lord.
Let us swear to set free
The land of our birth:
United, by God,
Who can overcome us? (Note: The third verse, which is dedicated to the political thought of Giuseppe Mazzini, founder of Young Italy and Young Europe, incites the search for national unity through the help of divine providence and thanks to the participation of the entire Italian people finally united in a common intent.)

(repeat first stanza)

Chorus

From the Alps to Sicily,
Legnano is everywhere; (Note: In the Battle of Legnano of 29 May 1176, the Lombard League defeated Frederick Barbarossa; here, the event symbolizes the fight against foreign (Austrian) oppression. Legnano is the only city besides Rome mentioned in the anthem.)
Every man hath the heart
and hand of Ferruccio (Note: Francesco Ferruccio, defender of the Florentine Republic during the 1530 siege against the troops of Charles V, Holy Roman Emperor, who sought to restore the Medici lordship. In this circumstance, the dying Ferruccio was cowardly finished with a stab by Fabrizio Maramaldo, a captain of fortune in the service of Carlo V. "Vile, you kill a dead man", were the famous words of infamy that the hero addressed to his killer.)
The children of Italy
Are all called Balilla; (Note: Nickname of Giovan Battista Perasso, on 5 December 1746, began, after throwing a stone at an officer, the Genoese revolt that expulsed the occupying Archduchy of Austria from the city.)
Every trumpet blast
soundeth the Vespers. (Note: The Sicilian Vespers, an uprising against the French beginning on Easter Monday 1282, began with the signal of the city bells of Palermo.)

(repeat first stanza)

Chorus

The mercenary swords
Are feeble reeds. (Note: Mercenaries, whose use is anachronistically attributed to the Austrian Empire, are not valiant like the patriotic heroes but weak like rushes.)
Already the Eagle of Austria
Hath lost its plumes. (Note: The Austrian Empire is in decline.)
The blood of Italy,
The blood of Poland
It with Cossacks did drink, (Note: Poland had been dismembered by the Austrian Empire and its Russian and Prussian allies in living memory.)
But will burn its heart. (Note: A wish and an omen: the blood of oppressed peoples, who will rise up against the Austrian Empire, will mark the end.)

(repeat first stanza)

Chorus

Long live Italy,
She has awoken from slumber,
bound Scipio's helmet
Upon her head.
Where is Victory?
Let her bow down,
Because as a slave of Rome
God did create her.

(repeat first stanza)

Chorus

== Music ==
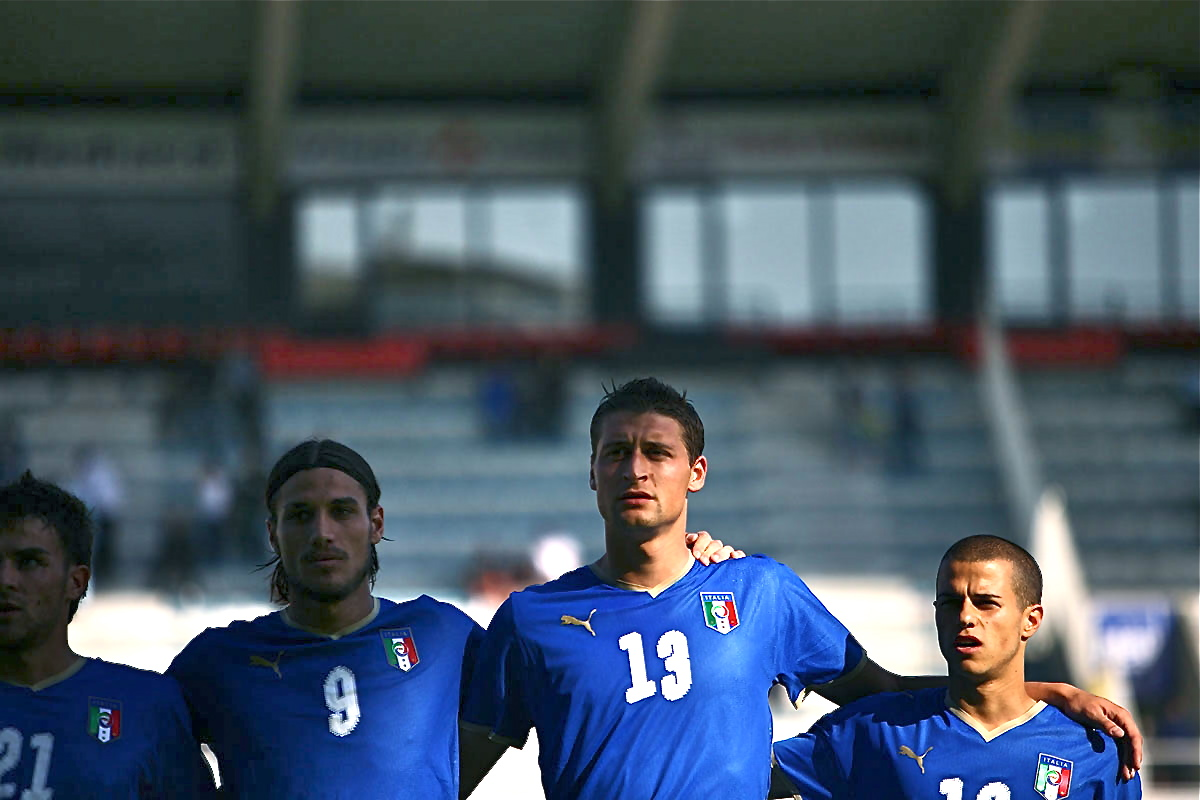
The Italy national football team during the playing of "Il Canto degli italiani" before a match

Novaro's musical composition is written in a typical marching time (4/4) and the key of B-flat major. It has a catchy character and an easy melodic line that simplifies memory and execution. On the harmonic and rhythmic level, the composition presents greater complexity.

From a musical point of view, the piece is divided into three parts: the introduction, the strophes and the refrain.

The twelve-bar introduction is an instrumental at allegro martial pace, with a dactyl rhythm that alternates one-eighth-note two-sixteenth-notes. The introduction divides into three four-bar segments, each alternating between a tonic chord and its dominant. The first four bars are in B♭ major; the second in G minor; and the last four bars return to B♭ to introduce the verses.

The strophes, therefore, attack in B♭. They repeat the same melodic unit, in various degrees and at different pitches. Each melodic unit corresponds to a fragment of the Mamelian hexasyllable, in accordance with the classical bipartite scheme ("Fratelli / d'Italia / ' Italia / s'è desta"). However, the usual leap of a diatonic interval does not match the anacrusic rhythm: on the contrary, the verses «Fratelli / d'Italia» and «dell'elmo / di Scipio» each begin with identical notes (respectively F or D). This weakens the syllable accentuation, and produces an audibly syncopated effect, contrasting the natural short-long succession of the paroxytone verse.

As written, the basic melodic unit combines a dotted eighth note and a sixteenth note:

Some performances soften this rhythmic scan by equalizing the note durations (as an eighth note), for ease of singing and listening:

At bar 31, the song undergoes an unusual shift for the refrain recognizable in the most accredited recordings of the autograph score. It accelerates to an allegro mosso, and permanently modulates to E♭ major, yielding only to the relative minor (C minor) during the tercet "Stringiamci a coorte / siam pronti alla morte / L'Italia chiamò". Also, the refrain is characterized by a repeated melodic unit; in the last five bars, it grows in intensity, passing from pianissimo to forte to fortissimo with the indication crescendo e accelerando sino alla fine ("growing and accelerating to the end").

== Recordings ==
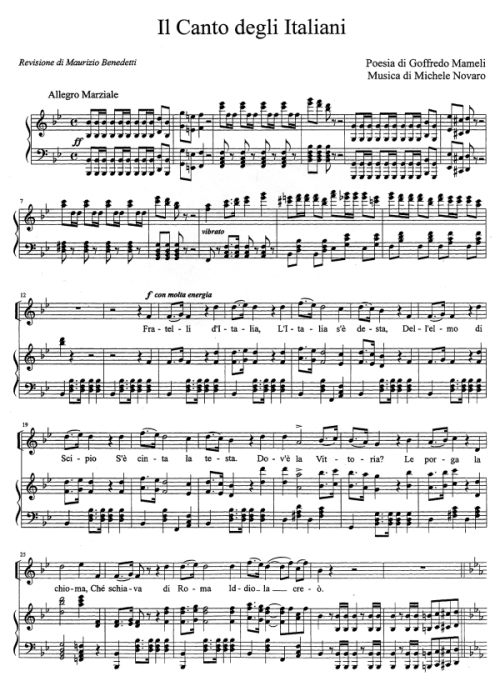
Score of "Il Canto degli italiani"

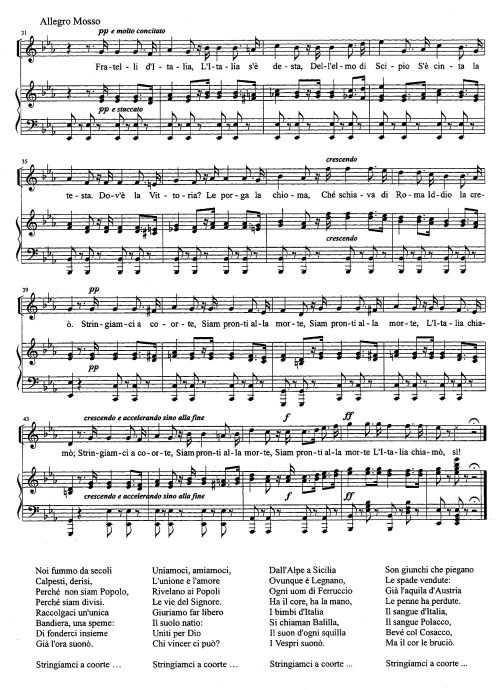

The two authors have been dead for more than 70 years, and the copyrights have lapsed; the work is in the public domain. Novaro disclaimed compensation for printing music, ascribing his work to the patriotic cause. Giuseppe Magrini, who made the first print of "Il Canto degli italiani", asked only for a certain number of printed copies for personal use. At Tito Ricordi's 1859 request to reprint the text of the song with his publishing house, Novaro ordered that the money be directly paid in favour of a subscription for Giuseppe Garibaldi.

Nevertheless, the publisher Sonzogno has attempted to collect royalties for use of the "Il Canto degli italiani" score. It also has the possibility of making the official prints of the piece.

The oldest known sound recording of "Il Canto degli italiani" (disc at 78 rpm for gramophone, 17 cm in diameter) is a 1901 recording of the Municipal Band of Milan under the direction of Pio Nevi.

One of the first recordings of "Fratelli d'Italia" was that of 9 June 1915, which was performed by the Neapolitan opera and music singer Giuseppe Godono. The song was recorded for the Phonotype label of Naples.

Another ancient recording received is that of the Gramophone Band, recorded in London for His Master's Voice on 23 January 1918.

== During events ==
Over the years, a public ritual has been established for the anthem's performance, still in force. According to the custom, whenever the anthem is played, if in an outdoor military ceremony, personnel in formation present arms while personnel not in formation stand at attention (unless when saluting during the raising and lowering of the national flag, as well as the trooping of the national flag for service or unit decorations). If indoors (including military band concerts), all personnel stand at attention. Civilians, if they wish, can also put themselves to attention. On the occasion of official events, only the first two stanzas should be performed without the introduction. If the event is institutional, and a foreign hymn must also be performed, this is played first as an act of courtesy.

In 1970, the obligation, however, to perform the "Ode to Joy" of Ludwig van Beethoven, that is the official anthem of Europe, whenever "Il Canto degli italiani" is played, remained almost always unfulfilled.
