= Michele Novaro =

Italian composer (1818–1885)

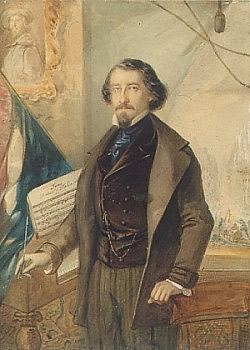
- Born: 23 December 1818; Genoa, Savoy
- Died: 20 October 1885 (aged 66); Genoa, Italy
- Occupation: composer
- Known for: composed the music of the original version of the Italian national anthem "Il Canto degli Italiani"

Michele Novaro (Italian pronunciation: [miˈkɛːle noˈvaːro]; 23 December 1818 – 20 October 1885) was an Italian composer.

Novaro was born on 23 December 1818 in Genoa, where he studied composition and singing at the Scuola Gratuita di Canto (now the Genoa Conservatory). Novaro is mostly known as the composer of the music of the Italian national anthem, Il Canto degli Italiani (lyrics by Goffredo Mameli), better known in Italy as Inno di Mameli (Mameli's Hymn).

Novaro was a convinced liberal and offered his compositional talents to the unification cause without deriving any personal benefits. He died poor on 20 October 1885, after a life riddled with financial and health difficulties. He was buried at the Monumental Cemetery of Staglieno in Genoa.
