= Marcia Reale =

Former national anthem of Italy

Marcia Reale d'Ordinanza
English: Royal March of Ordinance
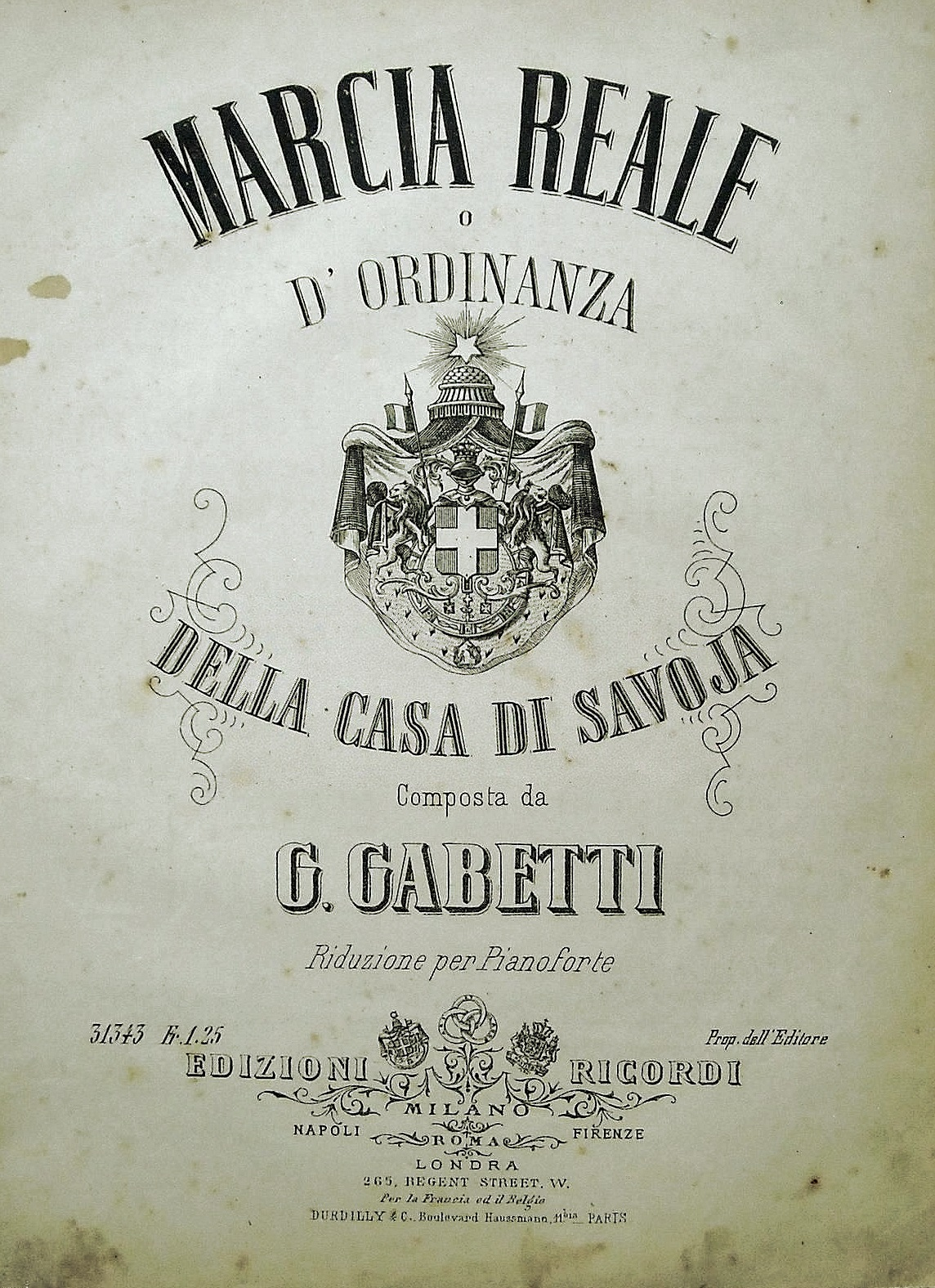
- Former national anthem of Italy; Kingdom of Sardinia from 1831 until 1861; Italian Republic de facto from 18 June to 12 October 1946
- Also known as: Fanfara Reale (English: Royal Fanfare)
- Lyrics: Napoleone Giotti
- Music: Giuseppe Gabetti, 1831
- Adopted: 1831 (by Kingdom of Sardinia); 17 March 1861 (by Kingdom of Italy); 18 June 1946 (by Italian Republic, de facto)
- Relinquished: September 1943 (by Kingdom of Italy), readopted in June 1944, relinquished on 18 June 1946 (by Kingdom of Italy), relinquished on 12 October 1946 (by Italian Republic)
- Preceded by: "La Leggenda del Piave" (in 1944)
- Succeeded by: "La Leggenda del Piave" (in 1943) "Il Canto degli Italiani" (in 1946)

Audio sample
- Marcia Reale (instrumental): file; help

The "Marcia Reale d'Ordinanza" (Italian pronunciation: [ˈmartʃa reˈaːle dordiˈnantsa]; "Royal March of Ordinance"), or "Fanfara Reale" (Italian: [faɱˈfaːra reˈaːle]; "Royal Fanfare"), was the official national anthem of the Kingdom of Italy between 1861 and 1946. It was composed in 1831 by Giuseppe Gabetti to the order of Charles Albert of Sardinia as the hymn of the royal House of Savoy, along with the Sardinian national anthem. It remained a famous, recognizable and cherished symbol of Italy throughout the history of the monarchy.

In September 1943, the future king of Italy Umberto II chose the patriotic song "La Leggenda del Piave" as the new national anthem, replacing the "Marcia Reale". It remained the official anthem of Italy until June 1944; when Rome was liberated and the government and the King returned to the capital, the Marcia Reale was in fact reintroduced as a national anthem and remained both after the appointment of Crown Prince Umberto of Savoy as Lieutenant General of the Realm and after his ascension to Kingship. After the 1946 Italian institutional referendum, the newly established Italian Republic selected "Il Canto degli Italiani" in its stead as national anthem.

== Lyrics (unofficial) ==
| Italian original | English translation |
Fanfara Reale
| Viva il Re ! Viva il Re ! Viva il Re ! Chinate o Reggimenti le Bandiere al nostro Re La gloria e la fortuna dell'Italia con Lui è Bei Fanti di Savoia gridate evviva il Re ! Chinate o Reggimenti le Bandiere al nostro Re ! | Long live the King! Long live the King! Long live the King! Lower, oh Regiments, your Standards to our King! Italy's Glory and Fortune Lie with Him Savoy's Grand Soldiers, Cry Out "Long Live the King!" Lower, oh Regiments, your Standards to our King! |
Marcia Reale
| Viva il Re ! Viva il Re ! Viva il Re ! Le trombe liete squillano Viva il Re ! Viva il Re ! Viva il Re ! Con esse i canti echeggiano Rullano i tamburi le trombe squillano squillano Cantici di gloria eleviamo con fervor Viva l'Italia, l'Italia evviva ! Evviva il Re ! Viva L'Italia, evviva il Re ! Evviva il Re !!! Viva l'Italia ! Viva il Re ! Viva il Re ! Tutta l'Italia spera in Te, crede in Te, gloria di nostra stirpe, segnal di libertà, di libertà, di libertà, di libertà. Quando i nemici agognino i nostri campi floridi dove gli eroi pugnarono nelle trascorse età, finché duri l'amor di patria fervido, finché regni la nostra civiltà. L'Alpe d'Italia libera, dal bel parlare angelico, piede d'odiato barbaro giammai calpesterà finché duri l'amor di patria fervido, finche regni la nostra civiltà. Come falange unanime i figli della Patria si copriran di gloria gridando libertà. | Long live the King! Long live the King! Long live the King! The trumpets joyously sound Long live the King! Long live the King! Long live the King! With these, the cries echo The drums roll, the trumpets sound and sound again Canticles of glory we fervently raise Long Live Italy, Italy, Huzzah! Long Live the King! Long Live Italy, Long Live the King! Long Live the King! Long Live Italy, Long Live the King! Long Live the King! All of Italy puts her faith in you, believes in you, glory of our race, sign of freedom, of freedom, of freedom, of freedom. When the enemy comes seeking our flourishing fields where heroes fought in the bygone ages as long as our fervent patriotic love lasts as long as our civilization reigns The Italian Alps will be free, angelic speech will reign, the hated barbarian will never set foot here as long as our fervent patriotic love lasts as long as our civilization reigns As a single phalanx the sons of the Fatherland will cover themselves with glory shouting "Freedom!" |

== See also ==
- Il Canto degli Italiani - the current national anthem of Italy, in use since 1946
- Giovinezza - the Fascist anthem sung after the "Marcia Reale" between 1924 and 1943
