= La Leggenda del Piave =

Italian patriotic song written by E. A. Mario

English: The Legend of Piave
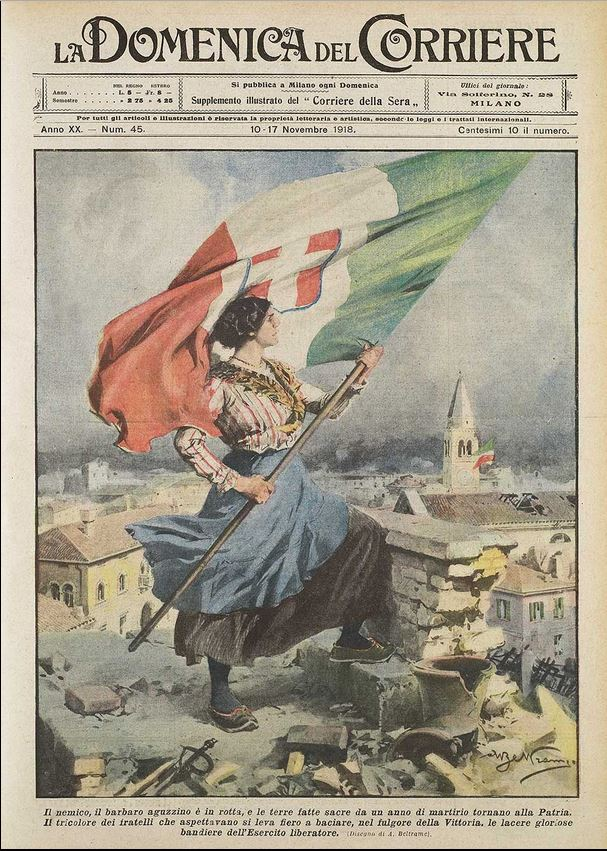
- A woman, representing Italy, celebrates the Italian victory over Austria-Hungary in the First World War with a tricolour over the newly conquered city of Trieste.
- National anthem of Kingdom of Italy
- Lyrics: E. A. Mario, 1918
- Music: E. A. Mario, 1918
- Adopted: September 1943
- Relinquished: June 1944
- Preceded by: "Marcia Reale" (1943)
- Succeeded by: "Marcia Reale" (1944)

Audio sample
- La Leggenda del Piave: file; help

"La Leggenda del Piave" (lit. 'The Legend of Piave'), also known as "La Canzone del Piave" (lit. 'The Song of Piave'), is an Italian patriotic song written by E. A. Mario after the Second Battle of the Piave River in June 1918. In September 1943, the future king of Italy Umberto II chose it as the new national anthem, replacing the "Marcia Reale". It remained the official anthem of Italy until June 1944; when Rome was liberated and the government and the King returned to the capital, the "Marcia Reale" was reintroduced as a national anthem and remained both after the appointment of Crown Prince Umberto of Savoy as Lieutenant General of the Realm and after his elevation to King. After the 1946 Italian institutional referendum, the newly established Italian Republic selected "Il Canto degli Italiani" in its stead. Today, the song is popular in Italy and played by a military band on National Unity and Armed Forces Day (November 4).

== Text ==
The song is divided in four parts and presents a brief history of the Italian front during World War I.

1. The march of the Italian army in May 1915 to the frontline.
2. The defeat at Caporetto.
3. The resistance along the Piave River.
4. The final battle at Vittorio Veneto and the victory.

== Lyrics ==
Italian
Il Piave mormorava

Calmo e placido al passaggio
Dei primi fanti il ventiquattro maggio:
L'esercito marciava
Per raggiunger la frontiera,
Per far contro il nemico una barriera…
Muti passaron quella notte i fanti:
Tacere bisognava, e andare avanti…
S'udiva, intanto,
Dalle amate sponde
Sommesso e lieve il tripudiar dell'onde.
Era un presagio dolce e lusinghiero…
Il Piave mormorò:
"Non passa lo straniero!"

Ma in una notte trista
Si parlò di tradimento/
Si parlò di un fosco evento
E il Piave udiva l'ira e lo sgomento.
Ahi, quanta gente ha visto
Venir giù, lasciare il tetto,
Per l'onta consumata a Caporetto/
Poiché il nemico irruppe a Caporetto…
Profughi ovunque dai lontani monti
Venivano a gremir tutti i suoi ponti…
S'udiva, allor, dalle violate sponde
Sommesso e triste il mormorio dell'onde,
Come un singhiozzo, in quell'autunno nero.
Il Piave mormorò:
"Ritorna lo straniero!"

E ritornò il nemico
Per l'orgoglio e per la fame,
Volea sfogare tutte le sue brame…
Vedeva il piano aprico,
Di lassù, voleva ancora
Sfamarsi e tripudiare come allora…
"No!" – disse il Piave –
"No!" – dissero i fanti –
"Mai più il nemico faccia un passo avanti!"
Si vide il Piave rigonfiar le sponde,
E come i fanti combattevan le onde…
Rosso del sangue del nemico altero,
Il Piave comandò:
"Indietro, va', straniero!"

Indietreggiò il nemico
Fino a Trieste, fino a Trento
E la Vittoria sciolse le ali al vento!
Fu sacro il patto antico;
Tra le schiere furon visti
Risorgere Oberdan, Sauro e Battisti…
Infranse, alfin, l'italico valore
Le forche e l'armi dell'impiccatore.
Sicure l'Alpi… Libere le sponde…
E tacque il Piave, si placaron le onde,
Sul patrio suolo,
Vinti i torvi Imperi.
La Pace non trovò
Né oppressi, né stranieri.

== Impact ==
The song was executed for the first time at the end of the battle held on June 23, 1918. General Armando Diaz addressed a personal telegram to the author to thank him for his musical contribution to the military victory of the Italian army.

In the years following World War I, the song became an anthem dedicated to the resistance during the war.

E. A. Mario refused to gain money from "La Leggenda del Piave". In November 1941, he donated his and his wife's wedding rings along with the first 100 gold medals he received as a tribute for this song by the towns along the river Piave, war veterans' associations, and private citizens to the "Gold for the Fatherland" initiative.

"La Leggenda del Piave" was one of the candidates to become the anthem of the new Italian Republic. However, "Il Canto degli Italiani" was chosen instead.

Today, "La Leggenda del Piave" is still widely popular and is commonly played during official ceremonies to remember the fallen and the final victory.
