= Balocchi e profumi =

Italian song

"Balocchi e profum'" sheet music cover, 1928.

"Balocchi e profumi" (lit. "Toys and perfumes") is a 1928 Italian song composed by E.A. Mario. Originally launched by Gennaro Pasquariello, it was popularized by Anna Fougez, as to become a classic in the repertoire of Italian café-chantant artists.

Described as "Canzone-Feuilleton", the melodramatic lyrics tell the story of a vain mother who ignores her daughter's requests for a toy, until the little girl is seriously ill; the mother soon buys the toys, but it's too late. The song was later covered by numerous artists, including Claudio Villa, Milva, Milly, Angela Luce, Nilla Pizzi, Luciano Tajoli, Aurelio Fierro, Emilio Pericoli, Giorgio Consolini, Quartetto Italiano.

The lyrics of the song inspired the 1953 film Balocchi e profumi directed by Natale Montillo and F.M. De Bernardi, and the 1979 film Profumi e balocchi directed by Angelo Jacono. The song was parodied by Renato Zero in his 1981 song "Profumi, balocchi & maritozzi".
