= SIAE =

Italian copyright collecting organisation

SIAE - Società Italiana degli Autori ed Editori
- Società Italiana degli Autori ed Editori
- Official logo

- Dominion
- Formation: 1882; 144 years ago
- Type: Corporation
- Purpose: Collection and distribution of copyright royalties
- Headquarters: Rome, Italy
- Location: Viale della Letteratura, 30
- Region served: Italy and worldwide
- Key people: Salvatore Nastasi (President), Matteo Fedeli (CEO)
- Budget: budget forecast
- Staff: 1014
- Website: (Italian), (English), (German)

The Italian Society of Authors and Publishers (SIAE) is a non-profit collective management organization in the form of a public economic entity with an associative basis, responsible for protecting intellectual works and managing copyright intermediation in Italy.

Today, SIAE is the sixth-largest collecting society in the world in terms of copyright revenue and safeguards the creative work of over 125,000 authors and publishers in the fields of Music, Cinema, Theater, Radio-TV and Online Works, Opera and Ballet, Literary Works, and Visual Arts. It collects and distributes copyright royalties to its registered members based on the use of their works.

Additionally, SIAE plays a key role in several organizations that advocate for creators' interests at both the European and international levels.

With a strategic plan focused on digital transformation, new skills, and more effective negotiations with major global players, in 2025 SIAE surpassed the one‑billion‑euro revenue threshold, distributing €849 million in royalties to its members while further reducing costs. Average commissions were brought down to 13.7%, reaching 8% for digital and 5% for major live events.

== History ==
The Italian Society of Authors was founded in Milan at 4:00 PM on 23 April 1882, in the Clock Room of Palazzo Marino. The previous day, several prominent figures from Italian culture, entertainment, publishing, and the arts had gathered there to discuss a unified plan for copyright protection. A total of 181 individuals, including scholars of science, literature, and the arts, joined the association. With the approval of its first statute, the SIA (Società Italiana degli Autori), the Italian Society of Authors for the Protection of Literary and Artistic Property, was born.

Since its foundation in 1882, indeed, the organization has undergone several name changes: SIA (Società Italiana degli Autori) from 1882 to 1926, SIAE (Società Italiana degli Autori ed Editori) from 1926 to 1942, EIDA (Ente Italiano per il Diritto d'Autore), and finally back to SIAE in 1945.

=== Context and premises ===
In the 19th century, the need for authors to have guarantees protecting their works grew across Europe. Initially, the issue attracted particular attention in France, where the Société des Auteurs et Compositeurs Dramatiques (SACD) had already been operating since its foundation in 1777 by Beaumarchais. Victor Hugo led a campaign to secure recognition of authors' rights and, in 1838, together with Balzac, Dumas, and George Sand, became one of the founders of the Société des Gens de Lettres (SGDL).

While Balzac lamented that "for the difficult product of intelligence, common law is suspended in Europe," Enrico Rosmini observed that "the theory of true absolute and perpetual ownership in favor of authors never had many followers in Italy." Instead, a specialized body of literature on theater emerged, primarily focusing on melodrama and analyzing various aspects of theatrical professions without ever mentioning authors and their rights. However, the issue gradually gained attention within national legislation and early international agreements, including the 22 May 1840 convention between the Emperor of Austria and the King of Sardinia.

In 1865, Italy enacted its first copyright law, Law No. 2337/1865, which was later amended by Law No. 2652/1875 and remained in force until 1925. As summarized by Rosmini, the new law required that "anyone wishing to claim copyright protection must submit two copies of their published work to the Prefect of the province, along with a declaration reserving these rights."

In 1878, in anticipation of the Universal Exposition, Victor Hugo strongly advocated for the SGDL to contribute to the International Literary Congress, which was scheduled as part of the celebrations alongside the centenary of Voltaire. He served as the Congress's president, and the recognition of literary property rights was the primary topic on the agenda. Among the Italian participants were Edmondo De Amicis, Tullo Massarani, Edoardo Sonzogno, and Giuseppe Garibaldi. The Congress produced several resolutions, including the principle that copyright should no longer be regarded as a mere legal concession, but rather as a fundamental form of property. Around the same time, Hugo was also involved in founding the Association Littéraire et Artistique Internationale (ALAI).

During this period, many authors, even well-known ones, faced financial hardship in their later years. At the Second Dramatic Congress on 24 February 1878, Alamanno Morelli spoke on behalf of those advocating for financial support for authors, noting that "in France and England, aging artists receive assistance." In this climate, the idea of an Italian organization to protect authors' rights began to take shape. The Second Dramatic Congress established a Commission tasked with studying the creation of an Authors' Society.

The Commission, chaired by playwright Paolo Ferrari, included political figures (Senators Tullo Massarani, Felice Mangili, and Francesco Brioschi), legal experts (Stefano Interdonato and Enrico Rosmini), and artists (painter Domenico Induno, sculptor Gerolamo Oldofredi-Tadini, and musician Antonio Bazzini). Additionally, it included literary figures Luigi Capranica, Giulio Carcano, Damiano Muoni, and Francesco Foucault di Daugnon, as well as academics Vigilio Inama, Cesare Cantù, and Giovanni Schiaparelli.

A smaller Committee was later formed in 1881 to finalize the establishment of the Society. Under the presidency of Cesare Cantù, around forty individuals contributed to drafting the Statute, including playwrights Leopoldo Pullé and Paolo Ferrari, jurist Giuseppe Pietro Edoardo Sacchi, and publisher Filippo Bernardoni. Meanwhile, the Minister of Justice, Giuseppe Zanardelli, who later became a member himself, issued a circular urging magistrates to take proactive action against literary piracy, stating that:

"Complaints about frequent and varied counterfeiting continue to arise from all directions, demonstrating that literary property is still not accorded the respect it indisputably deserves."

=== Foundation ===
The newly established SIA appointed Cesare Cantù as Honorary President, while the writer and painter Tullo Massarani served as its first official President. The Society was managed by a Council, consisting of a President and twenty elected members from among the associates. Within the Council, Giuseppe Verdi represented musicians, Edmondo De Amicis and Giosuè Carducci represented writers, Paolo Ferrari represented playwrights, and Leone Fortis represented journalists and literary figures. They were supported by legal experts Luigi Gallavresi and Napoleone Perelli.

Many prominent figures joined the Society. Among its founding members were Arrigo and Camillo Boito, Ermanno Loescher, Cesare Lombroso, Terenzio Mamiani, Gerolamo Rovetta, Edoardo Sonzogno, Antonio Stoppani, Giovanni Verga, and three government ministers of the time: Domenico Berti, Pasquale Stanislao Mancini, and Giuseppe Zanardelli. The Society’s headquarters consisted of two rooms in Palazzo Pullé, located at Via Brera 19, Milan.

Article 2 of the Statute stated that:

"The purpose of the Society is: (a) the mutual protection of copyright belonging to its members; (b) the moral and material support of its members."

Membership was open to "all writers and authors of scientific, literary, and artistic works, whether Italian or residing in Italy; including men of letters, painters, sculptors, musicians, engineers, architects, publishers, theater directors, and all those who could justify holding copyright. In general, anyone involved in science, literature, or the arts who adhered to the Society’s Statute."

The membership fee was 10 lire, with an annual contribution of 20 lire. Applications for membership were addressed to the Council, signed by the candidate, and co-signed by two existing members, who endorsed the application.

In the following years, notable figures such as Antonio Fogazzaro, Giacomo Puccini, Sabatino Lopez, Tito Ricordi, and Pietro Mascagni joined the Society. Among the most active members were prominent figures in book and music publishing, including Giulio Ricordi (a Council member since 1889), Emilio Treves (the first Vice President of SIA), Ermanno Loescher, Ulrico Hoepli, and Edoardo Sonzogno.

During its first four years, the Society's founding members focused on establishing national and international relations. The publication of Atti e Notizie helped promote the Society abroad, leading to a growing number of bilateral agreements with similar foreign organizations.

On 18 May 1882, Law No. 756 came into effect, making copyright infringement a prosecutable offense and increasing financial penalties for unauthorized performances or unauthorized modifications of works, such as additions, reductions, or variations.

=== The Years of Praga ===
On 28 June 1896, Marco Praga, a playwright and theater critic, was appointed General Director of the SIA. He held this position until 1911, before returning as President in the post-WWI period. He was the one who organized a territorial network to ensure more widespread protection for authors.

At the same time, in 1903, he established a Mutual Aid Fund to support members in difficulty. In the same year, he began a policy of intervention to strengthen SIA’s presence in the world of Italian artistic production. In these contexts, the discontent and difficulties faced by authors were still significant, as their rights were not recognized by theater managers. For example, in theater, the issue was so severe that many years later, as defined by Eduardo De Filippo, the term "copyright" was either not considered or excluded from negotiations.

=== The Development ===
The subsequent events of SIAE can be summarized as follows:

- The society obtained from the state, in 1921, the responsibility for the verification and collection of taxes on theatrical performances, later extended to other types of performances, with this arrangement being renewed until 1999, the year when such a tax was abolished.
- Between 1896 and 1929, the society gradually transformed into an organization that explicitly operated in the economic field, anticipating its role as an intermediary between authors and performers. In fact, in 1926/1927, it moved its headquarters to Rome, became the Società Italiana degli Autori ed Editori, and joined the International Confederation of Societies of Authors and Composers (CISAC).
- 1942: It became a public entity and was named the Ente Italiano per il Diritto d'Autore (EIDA) (but only until 1945, after which it reverted to the name SIAE).
- In 1970, starting from January, it took over the mechanical reproduction rights from Sedrim.
- In 1999, Legislative Decree No. 419 defined it as a public entity with an associative basis.
- In 2008, Law No. 2, dated 9 January, defined it as a public economic entity with an associative basis.

On 13 February 2006, Legislative Decree No. 118 came into effect regarding "copyright of an artwork on subsequent resales of the original," and it was suggested to evaluate the possibility of determining that the ministerial decree should be adopted by not only SIAE but also the category trade unions of authors, in order to more directly protect the interests of the latter. This observation was not accepted, as it was deemed necessary to consult SIAE, which, according to the legislation, already fully and institutionally represents the interests of authors.

SIAE is subject to joint supervision by the Council of Ministers and the Ministry for Cultural Heritage and Activities and Tourism, with the Ministry of Finance consulted for matters within its competence, as provided by Law No. 2/2008.

== Organization ==
SIAE, through its General Directorate, operates in six specialized sectors: Music, Cinema, Radio and TV, Theater, Opera and Ballet, Literary Works, and Visual Arts. For copyright management activities, SIAE also operates through its territorial network, which is divided into four areas:

- Northwest Area: Piedmont, Liguria, Valle d’Aosta, and Lombardy
- Northeast Area: Veneto, Friuli Venezia Giulia, Trentino-Alto Adige, Emilia-Romagna, and Marche
- Central Area: Tuscany, Lazio, Abruzzo, Umbria, and Sardinia
- Southern Area: Apulia, Basilicata, Campania, Molise, Calabria, and Sicily

The regional branches and authorized agencies across the country report to these areas. These agencies handle front-office operations and ensure oversight and control in the entertainment and performing arts sectors. They operate under a specific mandate contract, act autonomously, and receive compensation through commissions on revenues and fees for other assigned services.

The decision-making bodies of SIAE include the Assembly, the Supervisory Board, the Management Board, and the Board of Auditors.

SIAE plays a major role in the "Comitato consultivo permanente per il diritto d'autore" (Permanent Advisory Committee of copyright) according to rules established under the corporate law.

=== The Board of Directors Over the Years ===
Over time, several prominent figures have held leadership roles at SIAE. In addition to honorary presidents Cesare Cantù (1882-1895) and Gabriele D’Annunzio (1920-1938), the following have served as Presidents and Board Members of the Board of Directors:

- President: Tullo Massarani (1882-1886)
- President: Arrigo Boito (1913-1916)
- President: Marco Praga (1916-1919)
- President: Mario Vinciguerra (1946-1969)
- President: Antonio Ciampi (1957-1976)
- President: Roman Vlad (1987-1993)
- President: Luciano Villevielle Bideri (1996-2002)
- President: Franco Migliacci (2003-2005). Board Members: Diego Cugia, Tino Cennamo, Antonio Marrapodi, Giovanni Natale, Ivan Cecchini, Silvano Guariso
- President: Giorgio Assumma I (2005-2008). Board Members: Diego Cugia, Tino Cennamo, Giovanni Natale, Ivan Cecchini, Silvano Guariso
- President: Giorgio Assumma II (2009-2010). Board Members: Roby Facchinetti, Emidio Greco, Lorenzo Ferrero, Paolo Corsi, Giovanni Natali
- President: Gino Paoli (2013-2015)
- President: Filippo Sugar (2015-2018)
- President: Mogol (2018-2022). Board Members: Roberto Razzini, Claudio Buja, Paola Dubini, Andrea Purgatori
- President: Salvatore Nastasi (2022–present). Board Members: Roberto Razzini, Paolo Franchini, Claudio Carboni, Roberto Giacomo "Pivio" Pischiutta.

== Authors and Publishers in SIAE ==
=== Membership ===
An author or publisher can entrust the protection of their works to SIAE through a relationship that can be either as a member or by granting a mandate, for one or more repertoires managed by SIAE: Music, Cinema, Theatrical Works, Radio/TV and Online, Operatic and Choreographic Works, Literary Works, and Visual Arts. Authors can also register through the SIAE+ app, which the Society provides free of charge on iOS and Android.

Today, SIAE has over 125,000 authors and publishers.

Membership is renewed annually through the payment of a fee, both for association and for mandate arrangements. For authors under the age of 30 and startups less than two years old, association membership is completely free, while mandate registration for these categories only requires the payment of a revenue stamp. Membership is also free for those over 80 and for authors with a disability of more than one-third.

The key difference between membership and a mandate is that members have the right to vote and run for election to SIAE's governing bodies, including the Board of Directors and Supervisory Board.

Authors, publishers, and rights holders who are not citizens of a European Union country can have their works protected by SIAE only through a mandate arrangement.

=== Services ===
SIAE offers, among others:

- an app for rights-holders to manage their data and royalties;
- a repertoire cataloguing the works SIAE manages rights of;
- portals and apps for event organizers to declare their playlists;
- various promotional events of Italian music abroad, including yearly music award show, events and promotions.

Over 225.000 songs have been deposited on SIAE+ app in 2025.

== SIAE and Creative Commons ==
SIAE effectively bans its associates from using Creative Commons Licenses, because it demands an exclusive license on all the works it administers except for some cases where the authors are allowed to give noncommercial licenses to their works provided SIAE gives permission.

On 23 December 2008, a mixed legal working group, composed of both SIAE and Creative Commons Italia members was announced. The aim of the group was to allow the authors to choose free and easy-to-use licenses, keeping the commercial use to themselves, and relying on SIAE only for distribution and collection of revenues. Deborah De Angelis noted the difficulty of determining what constitutes noncommercial use.

In 2019, after a controversy with independent collecting society Soundreef, SIAE agreed to relax the exclusivity requirements. As of 2025, authors are also allowed to restrict SIAE's exclusive license to specific territories or categories of works, under article 8 of the charter.

== Results ==
SIAE's financial results, after the difficult times coming from pandemic and the related crisis of creative and entertainment sectors, are experiencing a positive trend peaking with record results in 2025 (1 billion and 22 million euros turnover).

== Distribution ==
Throughout the year SIAE periodically distributes to members royalties collected among users of several creative repertoires, such as music, audiovisual works, theatrical/dramatic works, ballet, radio-tv works, literature and visual arts.

=== Royalty distribution and member rights ===
- The influence of a vote in assembly decisions is not the same for all members, but varies according to the amount of royalties received by the member.
- Until 2017, SIAE used to be a legal monopoly in Italy, granted by the State to perform mediation activities.

== Competitors ==
Soundreef has been an alternative to SIAE since 2011. In 2017, Italian singers like J-Ax, Fedez, and Enrico Ruggeri chose to work with this company instead of SIAE. After a few years with Soundreef, Fedez decided to return to SIAE in 2023. J-Ax also decided to return to the collecting society SIAE.

According to AGCOM, SIAE represents 99,2% of the market, while Soundreef stands for the remaining 0,8%.

== See also ==
- Copyright law of Italy
