= Goffredo Mameli =

Italian poet and writer (1827–1849)

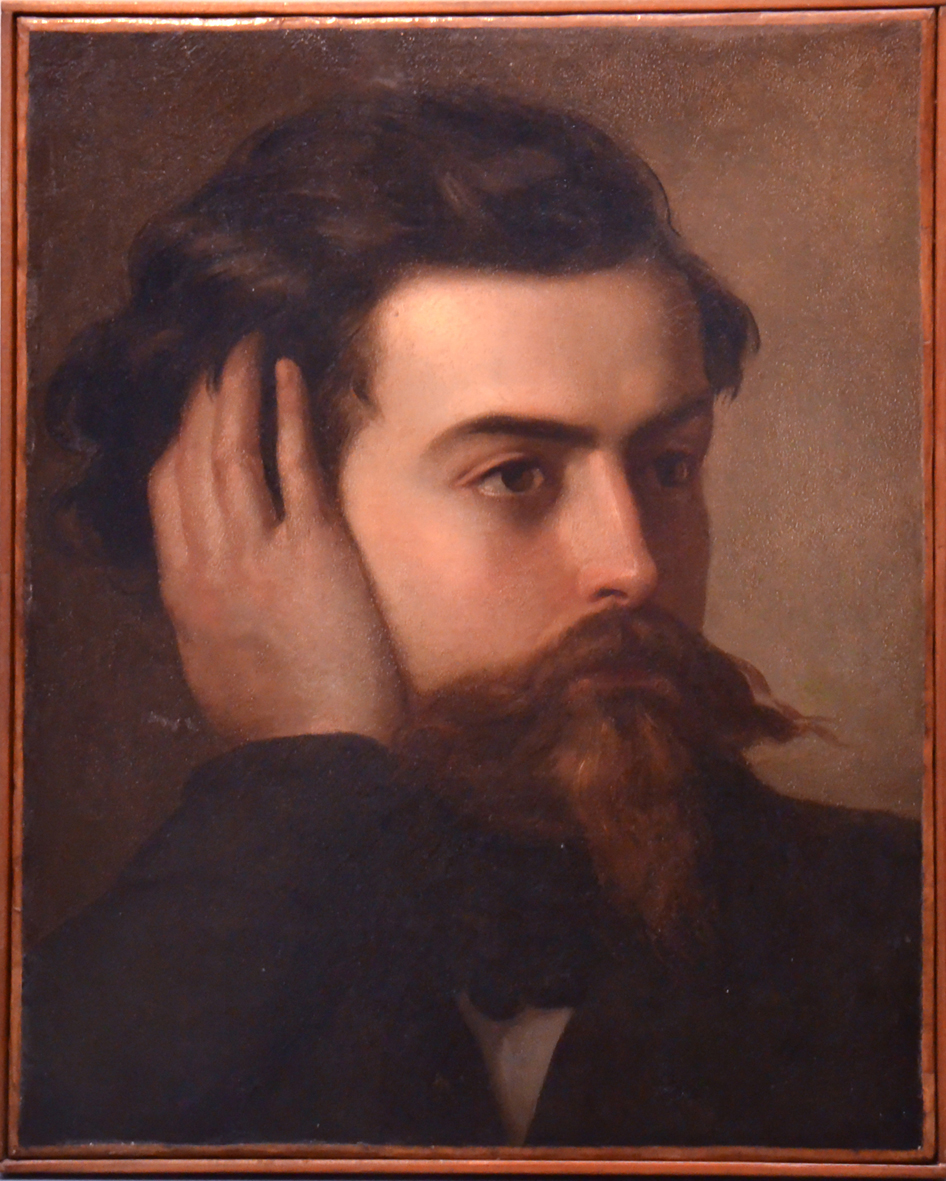
- Portrait of Mameli by Domenico Induno, c. 1849
- Born: 5 September 1827; Genoa, Kingdom of Sardinia
- Died: 6 July 1849 (aged 21); Rome, Papal States
- Resting place: Garibaldi Ossuary Mausoleum, Janiculum, Rome
- Occupations: Patriot; poet; writer
- Known for: Writing the original lyrics of the Italian national anthem "Il Canto degli Italiani"

Goffredo Mameli (Italian pronunciation: [ɡofˈfreːdo maˈmɛːli]; 5 September 1827 – 6 July 1849) was an Italian patriot, poet and writer who was a notable figure in the Risorgimento. He is famously the lyricist of "Il Canto degli Italiani"—the national anthem of Italy.

== Biography ==
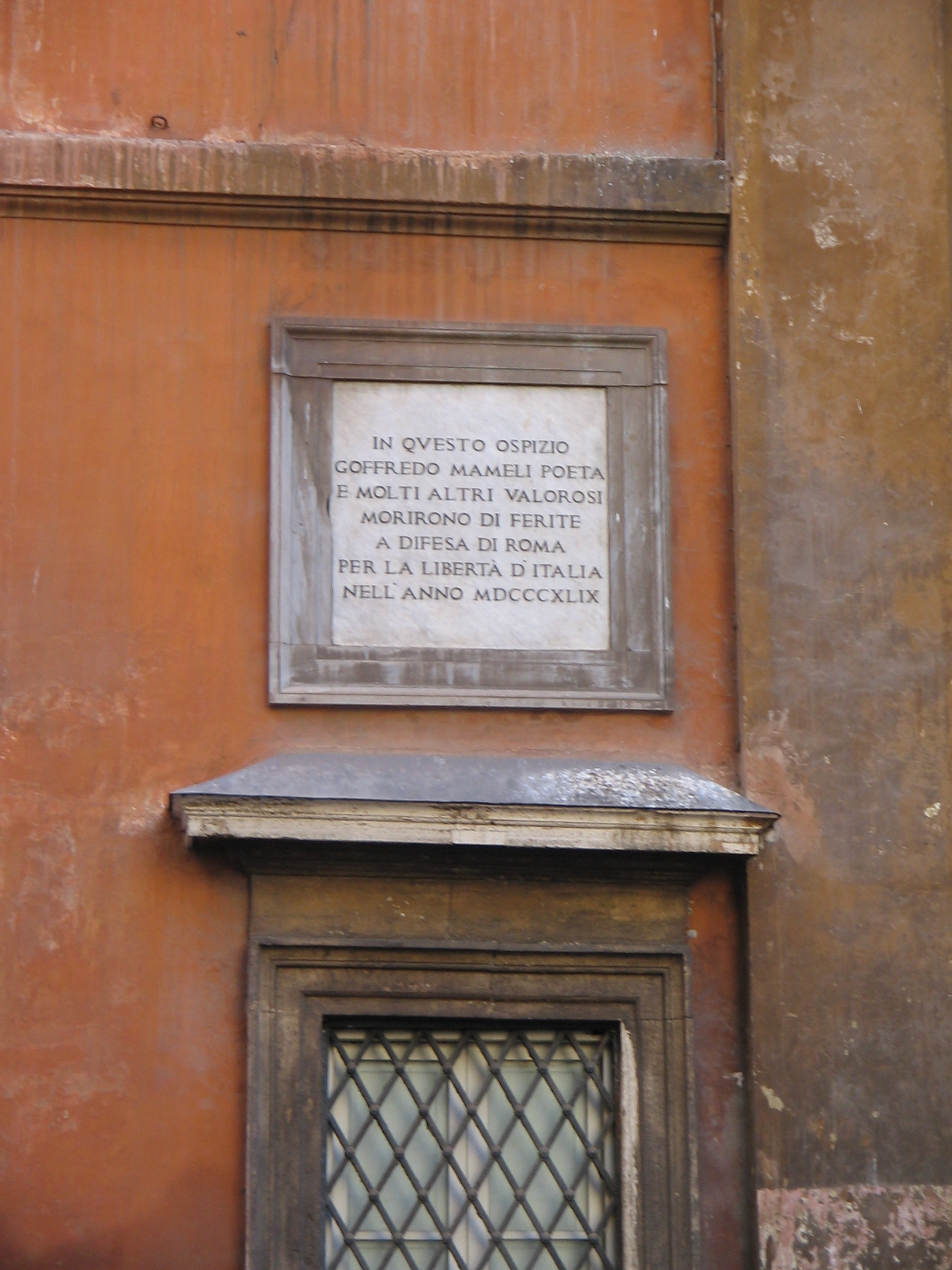
Memorial tablet at the church of Santissima Trinità dei Pellegrini, Rome. The text states: "In this hospice poet Goffredo Mameli and many other valiant men died of wounds in defence of Rome for Italian freedom in the year MDCCCXLIX".

The son of an aristocratic Sardinian admiral, Mameli was from Genoa where he was born, and where his father was in command of the fleet of the Kingdom of Sardinia. At the age of seven he was sent to Sardinia, to his grandfather's place, to escape the risk of cholera, but soon came back to Genoa to complete his studies.

The achievements of Mameli's very short life are concentrated in only two years, during which time he played major parts in insurrectional movements and the Risorgimento.

In 1847 Mameli joined the Società Entelema, a cultural movement that soon would have turned to a political movement, and here he became interested in the theories of Giuseppe Mazzini.

Mameli is mostly known as the author of the lyrics of the Italian national anthem, Il Canto degli Italiani (music by Michele Novaro), better known in Italy as Inno di Mameli (Mameli's Hymn). These lyrics were used for the first time in November 1847, celebrating King Charles Albert of Sardinia in his visit to Genoa after his first reforms. Mameli's lyrics to a "hymn of the people" —"Suona la tromba"— were set by Giuseppe Verdi the following year.

Mameli was deeply involved in nationalist movements and some more "spectacular" actions are remembered, such as his exposition of the Tricolore (current Italian flag, then prohibited) to celebrate the expulsion of Austrians in 1846. Yet, he was with Nino Bixio (Garibaldi's later major supporter and friend) in a committee for public health, already on a clear Mazzinian position. In March 1848, hearing of the insurrection in Milan, Mameli organised an expedition with 300 other patriots, joined Bixio's troops that were already on site, and entered the town. He was then admitted to Garibaldi's irregular army (really the volunteer brigade of general Torres), as a captain, and met Mazzini.

Back in Genoa, he worked more on a literary side, wrote several hymns and other compositions, he became the director of the newspaper Diario del Popolo ("People's Daily"), and promoted a press campaign for a war against Austria. In December 1848 Mameli reached Rome, where Pellegrino Rossi had been murdered, helping in the clandestine works for declaration (9 February 1849) of the Roman Republic. Mameli then went to Florence where he proposed the creation of a common state between Tuscany and Latium.

In April 1849 he was again in Genoa, with Bixio, where a popular insurrection was strongly opposed by General Alberto La Marmora. Mameli soon left again for Rome, where the French had come to support the Papacy (Pope Pius IX had actually escaped from the town) and took active part in the combat.

=== Death ===
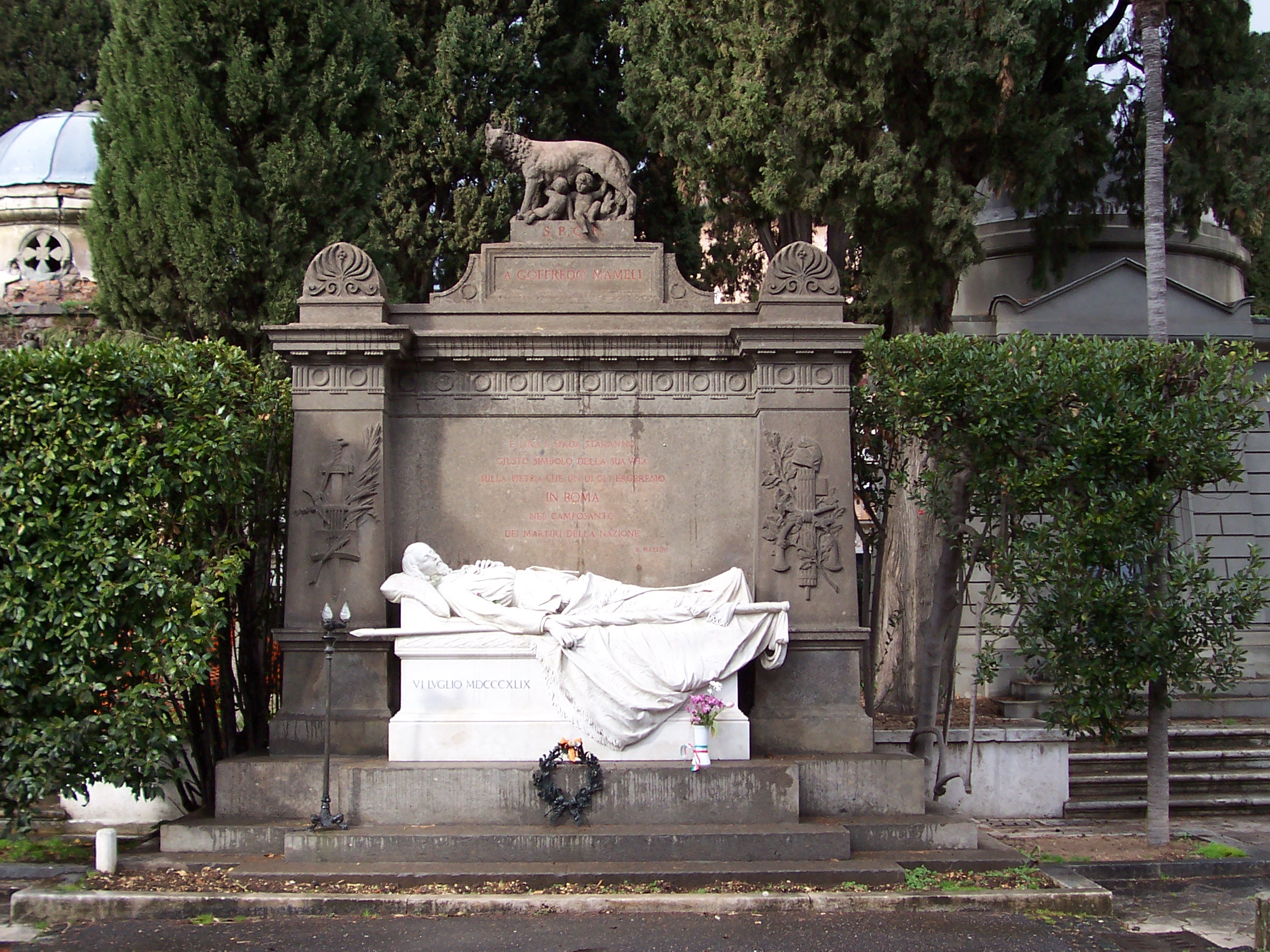
Luciano Campisi's grave monument to Mameli in Campo Verano, Rome, built in 1891. (Note: The original Italian text: "E lira e spada staranno giusto simbolo della sua vita sulla pietra che un dì gli ergeremo in Roma nel camposanto dei Martiri della Nazione" ("Both lyre and sword will remain, as the fair symbol of his life, on the stone we will raise in his honor one day in the cemetery of the Nation's Martyrs in Rome") — Giuseppe Mazzini)

During the siege of Rome, he was an aide of Giuseppe Garibaldi, who fought in Palestrina (9 May) and in Velletri (19 May). In particular he fought in the defense of the Villa del Vascello on the Janiculum hill. He was wounded in the left leg by the French during the last assault of 3 June at Villa Corsini, occupied by the French.

Mameli suffered from gangrene, which doctor Pietro Maestri observed after four days. After a consultation with Maestri and other doctors, it was decided to amputate the leg, performed by surgeon Paolo Maria Raffaello Baroni. Despite this, the infection gradually increased to the point of causing death by sepsis, on 6 July 1849, at the age of 21, in the hospice of Trinità dei Pellegrini. He was originally buried at Campo Verano in Rome; however, his remains were moved to the Garibaldi Ossuary Mausoleum on the Janiculum in 1941.

== Bibliography ==
- Barrili, Anton Giulio (1902). Scritti editi ed inediti di G. Mameli. Genoa: Soc.Ligure di Storia Patria.
- Anton Giulio Barrili (1 June 1902). "G. Mameli nella vita e nell'arte". Nuova Antologia.
