= Copyright law of Italy =

Provisions related to Italian copyright law (diritto d'autore) are found in Law no. 633 of 22 April 1941 (along with its various amendments). Certain fundamental provisions are also found in the Italian Civil Code of 1942, Arts. 2575–2583.

Copyright law in Italy has not changed much since the first enactment of these provisions. There have been amendments to Law no. 633 to incorporate specific works such as computer programs and databases, or to add or alter user exceptions, but generally Italian lawmakers have been reluctant to institute any major or fundamental reforms.

Italian copyright law is based strongly on authors' rights. Exceptions to authors' exclusive rights are limited – there is no provision equivalent to fair use or fair dealing — and are generally interpreted restrictively by the courts.

== Subject matter ==
The subject matter owed protection is provided for (identically) in both the Civil Code (art. 2575) and Law no. 633 (Art. 1): "The object of the author's right is the work of intellect of creative character that belongs to the sciences, literature, music, figurative art, architecture, theatre, and cinematography, no matter the style or form of expression." There is no requirement that the work be fixed in any medium to attract copyright protection.

While Art. 1 requires only that the work be "of the intellect" and "of creative character", Italian courts and scholars have interpreted the provision as conditioning copyright protection on four elements: (1) a particular (not high) degree of creativity; (2) novelty; (3) the work's objectification or externalization; (4) affiliation to art or culture.

Art. 2 lists non-exhaustive examples of protected subject matter ("In particular are protected..."): literary, dramatic, scientific, education, and religious works (whether in written or oral form); musical compositions with or without words; choreographic works and pantomimes; computer programs and databases.

Official acts of the State are not entitled to copyright protection (Art. 5).

== Ownership ==
The Civil Code states that the rights belong to the author and the author's successors, subject to special circumstances (Art. 2580).

== Formalities ==
Italian law does not require any copyright formalities such as registration or deposit for copyright to subsist. The Civil Code (Art. 2576) and Law no. 633 (Art. 6) provide that the rights are first acquired upon creation of the work as a particular expression of the intellectual effort.

== Economic rights ==
Exclusive economic rights in Italian copyright law are construed broadly. Art. 12 does not limit the manners in which economic rights may be exploited but provides examples. The author has the exclusive right to publish the work, and to use the work in any shape or form, original or derivative (within limits fixed by the law) and in particular certain exclusive rights such as reproduction in any manner or form by any process (Art. 13), public performance (Art. 15), and communication by wire, wireless, or Internet (Art. 16). The author also has the exclusive right to authorize renting or lending to the public (Art. 18-bis).

With respect to computer programs, databases, and industrial designs that are created by an employee in the course of her duties, the employer is exclusively entitled to exercise economic rights in the work (Arts. 12-bis, 12-ter). Likewise, where a photograph is taken in the course of duties, economic rights belong to the employer, or to the person who commissioned the portrait (Art. 88).

Certain categories of works are subject to special exploitation rights. For dramatico-musical works, profit is shared among authors in proportion to the deemed value of the contribution. For example, in the case of operas, the author of the music is afforded 3/4 of the total, while the author of the lyrics is afforded 1/4 (Art. 34). In a film work, the authors of the subject matter, scenario, and music, along with the artistic director, are considered joint authors. While the exploitation rights over the whole work belong to the producer, certain uses require the consent of the joint authors (Arts. 44–46). Broadcasting services may broadcast works that are performed in public places without the author's consent, but only if the work is not being performed for the first time. The author will in any case receive remuneration for these broadcasts (Arts. 52, 56, 57).

== Moral rights ==
In the author-centric Italian copyright law, moral rights, is eternal, non-transferable, and inalienable. The author, even after transfer of economic rights, retains the right to claim authorship and to oppose mutilation of the work or any act that would be prejudicial to her honour or reputation (Arts. 20, 22). Upon the death of the author, these rights may be relied upon by her family and descendants (Art. 23).

== Duration ==
The duration of economic rights for most works and for photographs in Italian law is 70 years from the death of the author (Art. 28). Where there are multiple authors, and for cinematographic works, the economic rights expire 70 years after the death of the last surviving author (Arts. 26, 32). For works in which the economic rights are owned by government, academies, public bodies, and non-profit cultural organizations, the duration of the economic rights is 20 years from the first publication (Art. 29). Nonetheless, under the Cultural Heritage Code, copyright on certain works is effectively eternal, including works that were made centuries before Italy had its first copyright law.

== Neighbouring rights ==
Italian copyright law also provides for certain exploitation rights over non-works. Phonograph producers have the exclusive right for 50 years from fixation (and without prejudice to the author's rights) to authorize reproduction, distribution, rental, lending, and Internet availability of the sound recording (Art. 72). Broadcasters have the exclusive right for 50 years from first transmission (without prejudice to author's rights) to authorize the fixation (as well as the reproduction and distribution of fixations) and retransmission of the broadcast (Art. 79). Performers have the exclusive right for 50 years from performance to authorize the fixation of the performance (as well as the reproduction, distribution, rental, or lending of the fixation) and the broadcasting of live performances (Art. 80). The performer is also afforded moral rights in that he may oppose any communication or reproduction of his performance that might be prejudicial to his honour or reputation (Art. 81). But the duration of this particular moral right is 50 years from the performance (Art. 85).

Italian copyright law mandates that unpublished personal correspondence and memoirs may not be communicated to the public without the consent of the author and addressee (where appropriate). This right does not expire and applies even when the work itself has fallen into the public domain. Likewise, a person's portrait may not be displayed, reproduced, or commercially distributed without the consent of the subject or of his family if he has died (Art. 93).

== Assignments and licences ==
Exploitation rights of the author, as well as neighbouring rights, may be acquired, sold, or transferred, if the transfer is set out in writing (Arts. 107, 110). But publishing contracts may not set out the transfer of indeterminate future rights (Art. 119). In other words, an author cannot contract for the transfer of rights that do not yet exist in law.

A further right of artists and authors is known as diritto di seguito ("right to follow"): the right to be remunerated when the first public sale of her original piece of art or manuscript exceeds the price of the first transfer. The artist is then owed a percentage of the profit made in subsequent public sales of the work (Art. 144). This right cannot be alienated, and persists for 70 years after the artist's or author's death (Arts. 147, 148).

== Exceptions and limitations ==
Italian copyright law does not have an equivalent to fair use or fair dealing provisions. Limitations and exceptions are set out individually and are interpreted restrictively by the courts, as one would expect in an author's rights regime. The private copying provision was not added until 1993.

Certain exceptions do not require remuneration to the author: the reproduction of current news articles or broadcasts, where the original source is indicated (Art. 65); the reproduction or communication of public speeches on matters of political or government interest (Art. 66); the use of fragments or quotations for criticism, discussion, or non-commercial teaching or research (with source indicated) (Art. 70); reproduction and communication for persons with disabilities (Art 71-bis); and the communication of low-resolution images and music over the Internet for educational or scientific purposes (Art. 70). Loans by state libraries made for cultural promotion or personal study do not require authorization or remuneration (Art. 69). Users may make reprographic reproduction of 15% of a work (excluding sheet music) for private use; remuneration is paid to the authors by the library or copy centre where the reproduction is made (Art. 68). Lawful users may also reproduce music and videos for personal, non-commercial use (Art. 71-sexies). Authors and phonograph producers are entitled to remuneration for these activities via levies on recording devices and blank media (Art. 71-septies).

Where a work is protected by a technological protection measure, the rights holders are obliged to adopt proper solutions to allow the exercise of certain exceptions and limitations by lawful users on request, where the exercise would not conflict with the normal exploitation of the work or unduly prejudice the rights holder (Art. 71-quinquies).

Freedom of panorama for use of artistic works in public spaces is not recognized in the Italian copyright law.

== Remedies and penalties ==
Law no. 633 provides for civil remedies such as injunction, damages (including non-pecuniary), destruction of infringing specimens, and destruction of copying equipment and devices primarily designed to circumvent technological protection measures (Arts. 156–161). A rights holder may also apply for an interim injunction for the infringement of economic rights (Art. 163).

Criminal penalties for infringers include fines and imprisonment (Art. 171). If the infringement is done with gainful or commercial intent the penalties are increased (Art. 171-ter).

== Collective management organizations ==
Italian copyright law allows for collective management of rights. The role of intermediary, however, is legally reserved for the Società italiana degli autori ed editori (SIAE) (Italian Society of Authors and Publishers), although membership is not mandatory (Art. 171). The SIAE is a public body that has a central role in the exercise of economic rights, being responsible for the granting of licences and authorizations, and the collection and distribution of royalties (Art. 171-ter). SIAE has a central role in rights administration, supervising public showings in cinemas, broadcasting, reproduction and distribution of audiovisual and photographic works, copy centres, and the manufacturing, import, and distribution of blank media (Art. 180). The organization also affixes its mark on media containing software, sound recordings, and moving images, that are intended to be placed on the market for sale or rent. This mark consists in a holographic sticker on which is printed the name of the author or copyright owner, a sequential ID number, and the final destination of the product (sale or rent) (Art. 181-bis).
