= Repercussion (singing) =

Singing technique

Repercussion (latinized form of "repeating" or "rebounding") is a special vocal singing technique consisting on singing a tone with a constant pitch.

== Background ==
The technique has been and is especially used in Gregorian chant where repetitions of sounds are prescribed by certain neumes, such as a distropha or a tristropha. The vocals are modulated in volume, without necessarily resulting in a pitch fluctuation, or a vibrato. If the singing is not performed by a soloist, the singers modulate their voices in unison according to the direction of the cantor. The perfect singing of repercussion requires vocal training and appropriate respiratory support.

A similar term, which means something different, is the word "repercussa". This is another name for the recitation tone, an important structural tone within the church modes.

== See also ==
- Gregorian mode
- Tremolo
