= Roderick Bovingdon =

Anglo-Maltese Australian writer and musician

- Born: 28 September 1942 (age 83); Attard
- Occupations: writer; academic; translator; musician
- Children: 2
- Writing career
- Language: Maltese; English; Italian
- Notable awards: Midalja għall-Qadi tar-Repubblika

Roderick "Rigu" Bovingdon, MQR (born 28 September 1942) is an Anglo-Maltese Australian writer, academic, promoter of Maltese culture, social commentator, translator and musician.

== Early life ==
Roderick Bovingdon was born in Attard, Colony of Malta, on 28 September 1942 to Rebekka Debono and Henry Charles Bovingdon, an Englishman born in South Africa. The family emigrated from Malta by boat and disembarked on the shores of Woolloomooloo, Sydney, Australia on 14 January 1959, when he was 16 years old.

== Career ==
The language of any group and/or nation is the sole cultural and intellectual property of the people who speak it: collectively.

— Roderick Bovingdon, Malta Independent article, 2012

In 1968, Roderick Bovingdon founded the first School of Maltese Language outside of Malta.

in 1974, he played a key role in the initiation of a popular Maltese song festival in Australia.

=== National for the Maltese Language ===
He has written numerous opinion pieces and commentary criticizing the National Council for the Maltese Language's prescriptivist stance and dismissive approach to diasporic linguistic norms.

=== Council for Maltese Living Abroad ===
In 2012, Tonio Borg, then-Deputy Prime Minister of Malta and Minister for Foreign Affairs of Malta, appointed Roderick Bovingdon to the Board of Experts as the Maltese community expert for Australia as part of the Council for Maltese Living Abroad, a council tasked with "keeping a registry of non-governmental organisations that were founded overseas by Maltese communities," among other initiatives and services for the Maltese diaspora.

== Musical career ==
In 1974, Rigu Bovingdon pioneered Maltese-language pop music outside Malta with the release of Bejn il-Ħbieb (Between friends), which was recorded in Sydney, Australia.

Għana singers Rigu Bovingdon and Joe Galea were featured in L’Imnarja, Fête des lumières (Malte), a 1983 documentary produced by the French National Center for Scientific Research (CNRS).

== Personal life ==
In 1965, he married Iris Pace. They have two sons.

== Awards and honours ==
On 13 October 2012, Bovingdon was named Honorary member of the Maltese Poets Association (in Maltese: Għaqda Poeti Maltin)

His 2015 book Laurent Ropà: L-Intellettwali Għawdxi-Franċiż was considered for the 2016 National Book Prize in the Historiographic Research category.

On 13 December 2018, he was awarded the Midalja għall-Qadi tar-Repubblika (Medal for Service to the Republic).

== Discography ==
- L-Aħħar Għana (Unknown, Cassette)
- Maltin u Għawdxin (1977, Vinyl)

== Publications ==
- 1982 - Jekk
- 1985 - Maltese Literature in Australia
- 2001 - The Maltese Language of Australia - Maltraljan
- 2009 - The Ballad of Truganini : Original Version and Translation from Maltese Il-ballata tat-Truganini
- 2015 - Laurent Ropà: L-Intellettwali Għawdxi-Franċiż
- 2019 - Maltralian : the Maltese ethnolect of Australia

== See also ==
- Maltralian
- Maltese Australians
- Maltese literature
