= Maltese people in the United Kingdom =

Maltese people in the United Kingdom Il-Maltin fir-Renju Unit
Total population
- Maltese-born residents 30,178 (2001 census); 28,000 (2009 ONS estimate); 26,351 (2021–2022 censuses)

Regions with significant populations
- London, Cardiff, Manchester

Languages
- English, Maltese, Italian

Religion
- Catholic Church

Related ethnic groups
- Maltese diaspora

Maltese people in the United Kingdom are citizens or residents of the United Kingdom who originate from the country of Malta.

== History ==
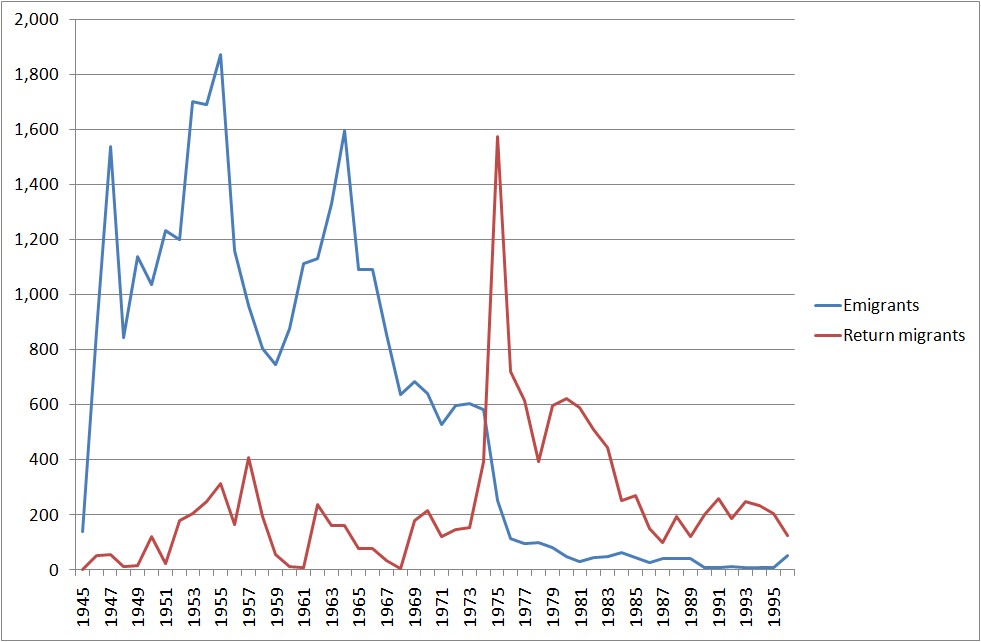
Post-World War Two migration flows from Malta to the UK

Prior to the passage of the Commonwealth Immigrants Act of 1962, there were few restrictions on Maltese migration to the UK. Malta had experienced significant emigration, particularly as a result of the collapse of a construction boom in 1907 and after World War II, when the birth rate increased significantly. In the nineteenth century, most migration from Malta had been to North Africa and the Middle East, with high rates of return migration, but in the twentieth century most emigrants went to destinations in the New World, particularly the United States and Australia. Numbers opting for the UK were smaller, despite the colonial links. Indeed, prior to World War I, there were very few Maltese in the UK, except for a community in Cardiff. The UK was seen as a distant and cold country by most Maltese. Between 1919 and 1929, 3,354 Maltese were recorded as sailing to the UK, with 1,445 of these returning in later years. The remainder did not necessarily all stay in the UK, however, with many subsequently moving on to Australia. Nonetheless, by 1932, a street adjoining Commercial Road in London was home to a Maltese community. Many of these Maltese people worked in London's docks. Similar communities existed around the docks in Chatham and Portsmouth.

After World War Two, Malta's Emigration Department would assist emigrants with the cost of their travel. Between 1948 and 1967, 30 per cent of the population emigrated. After 1962, Maltese people required vouchers to migrate to the UK, but these were relatively easy to obtain from the Emigration Department until 1971. The Emigration Department would arrange for prospective migrants to be interviewed by British firms in order to allow their passage to the UK to fill labour shortages. At this time, it was also common for Maltese women to marry British military servicemen, and for Maltese to join British merchant ships. Migration statistics recorded in Malta and the UK differ in terms of the number of Maltese migrants recorded. Maltese statistics suggest that 8,282 people left Malta for the UK between 1963 and 1970 (inclusive), with 949 recorded as returning. British statistics, meanwhile, suggest that 8,110 Maltese migrants arrived in the same period, excluding students, diplomats, seamen, visitors and their families. Between 1946 and the late 1970s, over 140,000 people left Malta on the assisted passage scheme, with 57.6 per cent migrating to Australia, 22 per cent to the UK, 13 per cent to Canada and 7 per cent to the United States.

Significant seasonal migration to the UK started in 1962. This year saw 70 Maltese women recruited to work in British fruit and vegetable canneries for six months. By 1967–69, 250 Maltese people per year were moving to the UK for seasonal work, mostly in the canning, ice cream manufacture and hotel and catering sectors. The seasonal migration of female workers was organised by the Emigrants' Commission of the Catholic Church in Malta.

According to the Malta Emigration Museum, between the end of World War Two and 1996, a total of 31,489 migrants left Malta for the UK. 12,659 subsequently returned to Malta. Net migration over the period was therefore 18,830.

== Demographics ==
The 2001 UK census recorded 30,178 Maltese-born people resident in the UK. The Office for National Statistics estimates that the equivalent figure for 2009 was 28,000. By contrast, there were 46,998 Maltese-born residents recorded by the 2001 Australian Census, 9,525 by the 2001 Canadian Census and 9,080 by the 2000 United States census.

In the 2021 UK census, 23,501 people in England were recorded as having been born in Malta, as well as 973 in Wales, and 205 in Northern Ireland. The census in Scotland was delayed by a year until 2022 and recorded 1,672 residents born in Malta.

== See also ==
- Malta–United Kingdom relations
- Maltese people
- Maltese Americans
- Maltese Australian
- Maltese Canadians
