= Emigration from Malta =

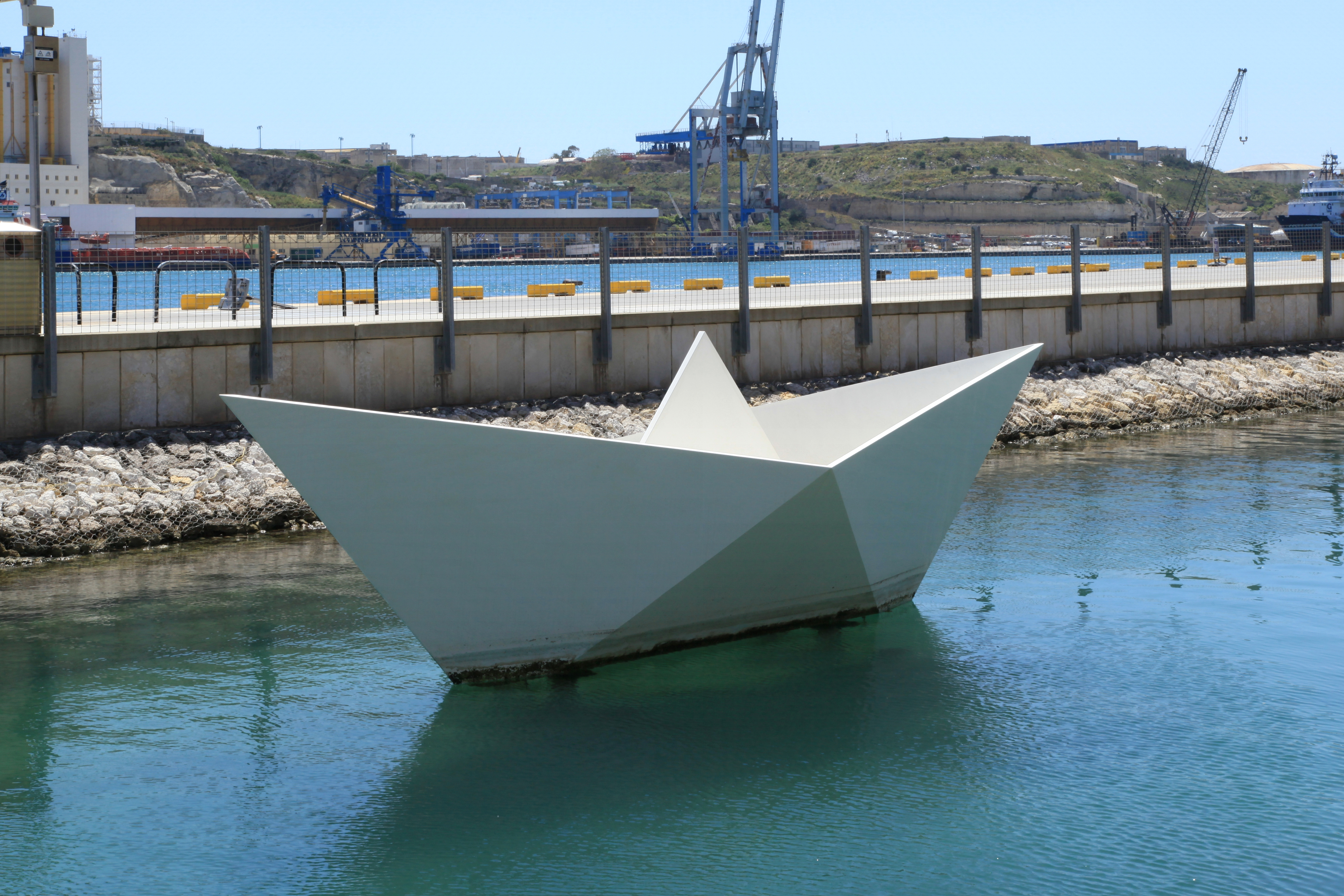
Child Migrants' Memorial at the Valletta Waterfront, commemorating the 310 Maltese child migrants who travelled to Australia between 1950 and 1965.

Emigration from Malta or the Maltese diaspora consists of Maltese people and their lineal descendants who emigrated from Malta. It was an important demographic phenomenon throughout the nineteenth and twentieth centuries, leading to the creation of large diasporas concentrated in English-speaking countries such as Australia, Canada, the United Kingdom, and the United States.

== History ==
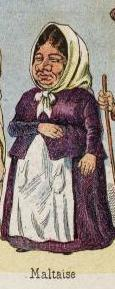
Caricature of a Maltese-Algerian lady, 1898

=== Nineteenth century ===
Mass emigration picked up in the 19th century. Migration was initially to North African countries (particularly Algeria, Tunisia and Egypt); later Maltese migrants headed towards the United Kingdom, the United States, Canada and Australia. There only traces left of the Maltese communities in North Africa, most of them having been displaced, after the rise of independence movements, to places like Marseille, the United Kingdom or Australia.

Malta has always been a maritime nation and for centuries, there has been extensive interaction between Maltese sailors and fishermen and their counterparts around the Mediterranean and into the Atlantic Ocean. More significantly, by the mid-19th century the Maltese already had a long history of migration to various places, including Egypt, Tripolitania, Tunisia, Algeria, Cyprus, the Ionian Islands, Greece, Sicily and Lampedusa. Intermarriage with other nationals (especially Italians and Sicilians) was not uncommon. Migrants would periodically return to Malta, bringing with them new customs and traditions that over time have been absorbed into mainstream Maltese culture.

In 1842, the total number of Maltese emigrants was estimated at 20,000, or 15 percent of the population of Malta. These numbers increased steadily throughout the 19th century. However, these early migration patterns were unstable and repatriation occurred frequently. For example, many Maltese emigrants rushed back to their homeland due to an outbreak of plague in Egypt in 1835 and again in 1840 during the Anglo-Egyptian crisis (see: London Straits Convention). According to Cassar Pullicino:

in spite of a certain amount of isolation there must have been a measure of adaptation by Maltese emigrants to local customs, food and dress. Besides, the frequent comings and goings of the Maltese in the 19th century must have facilitated the assimilation of at least some folklore material from North Africa that still needs to be identified.

In the nineteenth century, most migration from Malta was to North Africa (particularly Algeria, Tunisia and Egypt), although rates of return migration to Malta were high. Nonetheless, Maltese communities formed in these regions. By 1900, for example, British consular estimates suggest that there were 15,326 Maltese in Tunisia. There is little trace left of the Maltese communities in North Africa, most of them having been displaced, after the rise of independence movements, to places like Marseille, the United Kingdom or Australia. In the years preceding Tunisia's declaration of independence in 1956, most of the Maltese community left the country to settle in Marseille, France, which retains the biggest Maltese community in France.

NUMBER OF MALTESE EMIGRANTS IN N. AFRICA
Country	Year – 1842	Year – 1865	Year – 1880s
Algeria (Algiers, Philipville and Bône)	5,000	10,000	15,000
Tunisia (Tunis)	3,000	7,000	11,000
Egypt	2,000	5,000	7,000

=== Twentieth century ===
Malta experienced significant emigration as a result of the collapse of a construction boom in 1907 and after World War II, when the birth rate increased significantly, but in the twentieth century most emigrants went to destinations in the New World, particularly the United States and Australia.

There was heavy migration from Malta in the early 20th century and again after World War II until the early 1980s; however the destinations of choice during this period tended to be more distant, English-speaking countries rather than the traditional, Mediterranean littoral. Over 10,000 Maltese settled in Australia, Canada, the United Kingdom and the United States between 1918 and 1920, followed by another 90,000 – or 30 percent of the population of Malta – between 1948 and 1967. By 1996, the net emigration from Malta during the 20th century exceeded 120,000, or 33.5% of the population of Malta.

From 1919 to the 1920s, British colonial authorities in Malta spoke favourably about Maltese emigration to Palestine, specifically to Haifa, Jerusalem and the area around Mount Carmel. These efforts were supported by Governor of Malta Lord Methuen, Admiral Somerset Gough-Calthorpe and English Catholic Archbishop Francis Bourne, but the idea was ultimately unsuccessful as the British offered no financial incentives, support for the project in Malta was limited and emigration to Palestine was increasingly dominated by Zionism.

After World War II, Malta's Emigration Department would assist emigrants with the cost of their travel. Between 1948 and 1967, 30 per cent of the population emigrated. Between 1946 and the late 1970s, over 140,000 people left Malta on the assisted passage scheme, with 57.6 per cent migrating to Australia, 22 per cent to the United Kingdom, 13 per cent to Canada and 7 per cent to the United States. (See also Maltese Australians; Maltese people in the United Kingdom; Maltese in France; and Maltese in Greece).

Emigration dropped dramatically after the mid-1970's and has since ceased to be a social phenomenon of significance. Familiarity with the English language assisted Maltese migrants to assimilate in the host countries and the incidence of intermarriage with local foreigners is reputedly higher among Maltese emigrants than other ethnic communities. Extensive interaction between Maltese emigrants in Australia, Canada, the United Kingdom and the United States and their relatives in Malta, has brought Maltese culture closer to the English speaking world. Many Maltese emigrants and second generation Maltese Australians, Maltese Americans and Maltese Canadians returned to their homeland in the 1990s and recent years have seen an increase in the number of foreign expatriates moving to Malta, especially British retirees.

In 1995, a section of Toronto's Junction neighborhood was given the name "Malta Village" in recognition of the strong Maltese community that remains to this day. It is believed to be the largest Maltese community in North America.

SUMMARY OF MALTESE MIGRATION PATTERNS (1946–1996)
Country	To	From	Net migration	Return %
Australia	86,787	17,847	68,940	21.56
Canada	19,792	4,798	14,997	24.24
UK	31,489	12,659	18,830	40.20
U.S.A.	11,601	2,580	9,021	22.24
Other	1,647	907	740	55.07
Total	155,060	39,087	115,973	25.21

=== Twenty-first century ===
46,998 Maltese-born residents were recorded by the 2001 Australian Census, 30,178 by the 2001 UK Census, 9,525 by the 2001 Canadian Census and 9,080 by the 2000 United States census.

Since Malta joined the EU in 2004 expatriate communities emerged in a number of European countries particularly in Belgium and Luxembourg. At the same time, Malta is becoming more and more attractive for communities of immigrants, both from Western and Northern Europe (Italians, British Maltese and French Maltese) and from Eastern Europe (Bulgarians, Serbians and Maltese Greeks).

Following the Convention for Maltese Living Abroad in 2010, the Federation of Maltese Living Abroad (FMLA) was formally established, with representatives from various countries. In 2011, the Council for Maltese Living Abroad was set up. The Council for Maltese Living Abroad is made up of representatives of Maltese communities as well as experts in the field of migration and it was set up with the approval of the House of Representatives. The council is represented by 5 experts from Australia, Canada, UK, Europe and Malta and council members from Australia, USA, Canada, Europe and Malta. The council will also strive to set up a Maltese Cultural Institute.

== Maltese diaspora communities ==
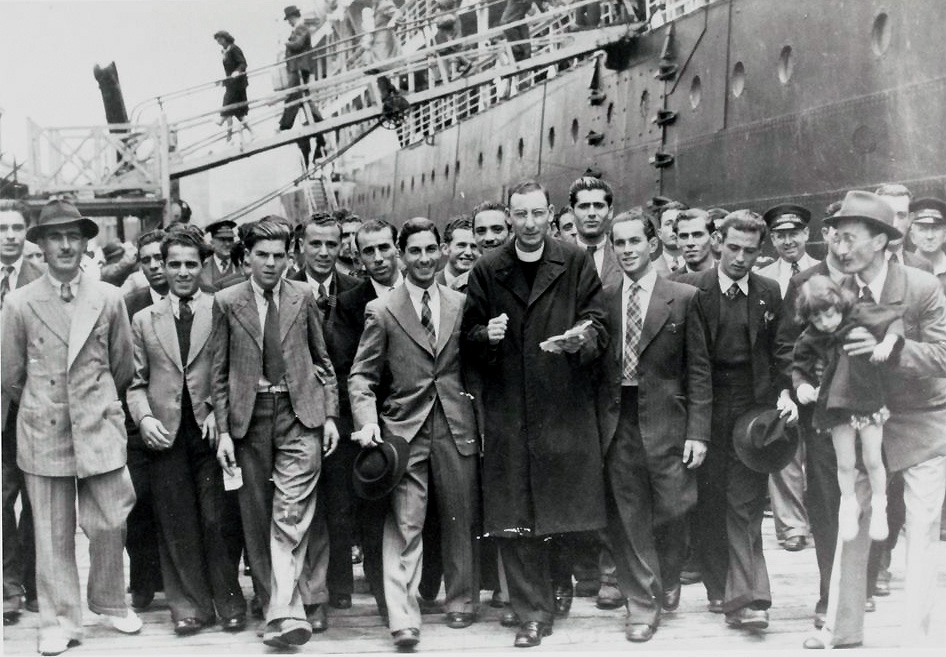
Maltese immigrants land in Sydney from the SS Partizanka, 1948

=== Australia ===
According to the 2011 Australian census, there were 163,990 people of Maltese descent and 41,274 Maltese-born people living in Australia; these numbers represented a decline of 5.6% from the 2006 census. The largest Maltese-Australian community in Australia is located in the state of Victoria, numbering at approximately 19,730 people.

The first Maltese to arrive in Australia was possibly inmate John Pace in June 1790, though it is not clear if he was sent from Malta or if he was Maltese at all. The first certain Maltese to arrive in Australia were convicts around 1810. The first Maltese immigrant (as opposed to convict or bonded servant) is thought to have been Antonio Azzopardi who arrived in 1838. Many attempts were made at organised mass migration throughout the 19th century but it was only in 1883 the first group of 70 labourers (and nine stowaways) arrived. The Australian government's 1901 Immigration Restriction Act kept the number of Maltese arrivals low in the early 20th century. Group and mass migration gradually picked up, first, to Queensland and, after World War I, to Sydney whose automobile industry drew many. A quota system for Maltese immigrants was introduced in 1920, but British pressure resulted in the quota being raised in 1923 and 395 Malta-born people lived in Victoria by 1933. While most emigrated to Australia from Malta, a number came from the United Kingdom where they had settled after having been expelled from Egypt, as holders of British passports, during the Suez Crisis. Maltese immigration to Australia reached its peak during the 1960s. The majority of Maltese immigrants reside in Melbourne's western suburbs of Sunshine (especially on Glengala Rd) and St Albans and in Sydney's western suburbs of Greystanes and Horsley Park. The Maltese, as in their home country, are predominantly Roman Catholic.

259 Maltese boys and 51 Maltese girls were sent alone to Catholic institutions in Western and South Australia between 1950 and 1965, following negotiations between the Maltese and Western Australian governments which had started in 1928 when Perth-based Maltese priest Father Raphael Pace urged the Christian Brothers to include Maltese children in its emerging migration scheme. Instead of receiving an education, many of them were exploited for building works and were never scholarised in English, while also forgetting their own Maltese language.

=== Belgium ===
Before 2003, the Maltese in Belgium were mostly people married to Belgians who had emigrated to the country or Maltese diplomats. In 2003 the employment of Maltese nationals with the European Union (EU) started in earnest in view of Malta's membership of the organisation. Most of the Maltese are in Belgium because of their employment with the EU. It is in fact estimated that of the 324 Maltese employed with the EU in 2010, around 250 worked in Belgium. This is why they consider themselves to expatriates rather than emigrants as was the case with the Maltese Diaspora in the demographic movements of previous generations. This also explains why most Maltese in Belgium either live in the Brussels-Capital Region or the municipalities bordering this region, in the area in and around the Brussels Ring. The 2008 statistics indicate a community that's more or less evenly balanced between the sexes and whose members are predominantly in the 25-40 age groups.

=== Brazil ===
The first Maltese colony arrived in Brazil in 1912 on board the SS Province, that landed in the port city of Santos with 73 persons. Another 106 arrived later the same year. All started working in the coffee plantations in São Paulo and in Fortaleza. As holders of British passports, they were considered by the Brazilian authorities as any other British subject. Many of them later returned to Malta. A second group of Maltese emigrants moved to Brazil in the 1920s, to work on the railroads; among them was Dominic Collier from Floriana, who held an administrative position in the São Paulo-Paraná railway company. The third phase of Maltese immigration to Brazil, in the 1950s and 1960s, had a different, religious rather than economic, motivation. The Franciscan Order of Malta had been asked by the State of Paraná to send priests and sisters to the growing diocese of Jacarezinho. Maltese priests later spread also to the States of São Paulo and Pernambuco. In 1977 Father Walter Ebejer - brother of Francis Ebejer - was consecrated bishop of the diocese of Vitória do Sul. Common surnames among the Brazilian Maltese include Busuttil, Zammit, Azzopardi, Balzan, Cutajar.

=== Canada ===
The Maltese emigration to Canada of significant manner occurred in 1840, followed by periods of emigration around 1907 and between 1918 and 1920. However, most Maltese emigrants settled in Canada after World War II. Most these immigrants settled in Ontario, mainly Toronto, but over time other Maltese immigrants moved to other Canadian cities including Montreal, Vancouver and St. John's. Approximately 18,000 Maltese people emigrated to Canada between 1946 and 1981, but emigration slowly reduced over time. In 2006 only 145 people of Maltese origin settled in the country. According to the 2011 Census, there were 38,780 Canadians who claimed full or partial Maltese ancestry, having an increase compared to those 37,120 in 2006. Today, most of people of Maltese origin, some 18,680 live in Toronto (more than 50% of the total Maltese Canadian population). An area of Dundas Street West in The Junction is known as "Little Malta" due to the historic Maltese population, as well as the continued presence of Maltese clubs and businesses. There are also Maltese communities in other parts of Ontario as well as in Montreal, Winnipeg and Vancouver.

=== Egypt ===
Some Maltese had been present in Egypt as early as the era of Napoleon and his conquest of Egypt. The proximity between the two countries and the similarity between the Maltese and Arabic languages have led many Maltese to settle in Egypt in the past, mainly in Alexandria. Like the Italians who settled in Egypt, the Egyptian-born Maltese constituted a portion of Egypt's Roman Catholic community. By 1939, up to 20,000 Maltese were living in Egypt. Practically all of these were French-speaking and those with a French parent had French as their mother tongue. In many middle-class families (especially in Alexandria and Cairo) a language shift had occurred, with Italian used as the home language alongside French; a large minority of Egyptian Maltese (for example those of the Suez Canal Zone) still retained Maltese as their mother tongue. This number was greatly reduced by emigration years after and almost completely wiped out by expulsions in 1956 due to the Maltese being British nationals. Most of the Egyptian Franco-Maltese settled in Australia or Britain, where they remained culturally distinct from immigrants from Malta. Those with French citizenship were repatriated to France (most often to Marseille). Post-war Malta in general did not accept refugees from Egypt.

=== Gibraltar ===
A Maltese community has existed in Gibraltar since shortly after its capture by an Anglo-Dutch fleet in 1704. The majority of the Spanish inhabitants were then expelled, leaving behind a garrison to be serviced by immigrants, mostly from Malta and Genoa. Immigration from neighboring Spanish towns soon followed, giving Gibraltar a very cosmopolitan population. Gibraltar's prosperity attracted immigrants from neighbouring Mediterranean lands and in 1885 there were about 1,000 Maltese people living in Gibraltar. Early in the 20th century the British undertook vast naval works and improvements to the existing fortifications of Gibraltar to make the rock practically impregnable. Many Maltese worked in the dockyard and others operated ancillary businesses. However, the economy of Gibraltar was not capable of absorbing a large number of immigrants from Malta and by 1912 the number of Maltese was already in decline (not above 700) as they returned to the Maltese Islands. Eventually those who stayed in Gibraltar became very much involved in the economic and social life in Gibraltar, most of them also being staunch supporters of links with the UK.

=== Greece ===
A large community of descendants of Maltese is still present in Corfu. Their forebears came to the island during the 19th century, when the British authorities brought many skilled workers from Malta to the Ionian Islands. The British needed married men so that their work would be continued by their children and as a consequence 80 people (40 families from 1815 until 1860) were transported to Corfu, whose descendants remain on the island today. In 1901, there were almost one thousand people in Corfu who considered themselves to be ethnic Maltese. In Cephalonia the number was 225. There were another hundred Maltese spread among the other lesser islands of the Ionian Group. Maltese emigration to these islands practically ceased when the islands were returned to Greece in 1864. Because of the union with Greece, a number of Maltese families abandoned Corfu and settled in Cardiff, Wales, where their descendants still live. In Corfu, two villages on the island bear names testifying to Maltese presence: Maltezika is named after Malta and Cozzella got its name from Gozo. In Cozzella the Franciscan Sisters of Malta opened a convent and a school in 1907. Those two institutions still flourish. In 1930, the Maltese in Corfu had their own priest who looked after their welfare while he kept useful contacts with the ecclesiastical and civil authorities in Malta. That priest was the Rev. Spiridione Cilia, who had been born in Corfu of Maltese parents and became the parish priest of the Maltese community. The Corfiot Maltese community currently numbers 3,500 people in the entire island. They constitute the center of the Catholic community of Corfu, but not one among them speaks the Maltese language. The former mayor of the city of Corfu, Sotiris Micalef, is of Maltese descent.

=== Italy ===
The town of Pachino, in the south of Sicily, was developed based on a royal decree of Ferdinand I of the Two Sicilies of 1760. Prince Ferdinand invited the Maltese neighbors to populate the new country and more than thirty families accepted the invitation. The first families were: Agius, Azzoppardi, Arafam, Buhagiar, Bartolo, Caldies, Bonelli, Camensuli, Borg, Cassar Scalia, Boager, Fenech, Farruggia, Grech, Mizzi, Meilach, Micalef, Mallia, Ongres, Saliba, Sultan and Xuereb.

Between 2008 and 2019 134 Maltese have acquired Italian citizenship

=== Libya ===
A community of Maltese in Libya was established in the 19th century. They remained in the country throughout the 20th century, as they were not subject to expulsion by the Qaddafi regime in the 1970s. Many Maltese continued to move to Libya for work, particularly after the thaw with the West of Qaddafi's regime in the 2000s, until the start of the Libyan civil war in 2011.

Maltese families still live in Tripoli to this day like The family of Abuhajr, the Faruja family, the Zmayt family and the Bazina family.

=== New Zealand ===
The first recorded Maltese migrant to New Zealand was Angelo Parigi, who is listed at St Patrick's Church in Auckland as having married 16-year-old RoseAnne McMullen on 4 July 1849. He was described as "a boatman born in Malta". Others followed including a James Cassar for whom some letters remained unclaimed at the Auckland Post Office in 1864. In 1883, Francesco Saverio de Cesare, who was tasked by the Government in Malta to assess the "suitability of the British Colonies in Australia as a field for Maltese Migration", reported that: "At Auckland I met three Maltese, there settled for several years and at Tauranga another one, employed as a cook; they are doing well; and have no idea of returning to Malta. They told me there are some other Maltese, whom they know, settled in Wellington, Christchurch and Dunedin." The Maltese Association of Wellington was founded in 1989, with Carmen Dalli as president. The latest census puts the number of Maltese residents in New Zealand at 222.

=== South Africa ===
The Maltese started to emigrate to South Africa right after the Second World War. In 1947–1948, 102 persons, particularly highly skilled workers, moved to the South Cape colony. Yet, this first wave was soon stopped, as the new South African government did not favour further immigration.

=== Tunisia ===
Tunisia was one of the early destinations of mass migration from Malta and here Cassola delves into its beginnings (1836–1844). Not surprisingly, Maltese migrants preferred settling in the coastal towns: Sousse, Monastir, Mahdia, Sfax, Djerba and Moknine, finding solace in the same sea which washed the shores of their homeland.

In the early decades of British rule, the economic situation was not prosperous, forcing thousands of Maltese to seek a better life across the sea. The difference between migration to Sicily and to Tunisia is that the former attracted individuals whereas the latter took in whole groups. Tunisia offered opportunities for the lower classes.

=== United Kingdom ===
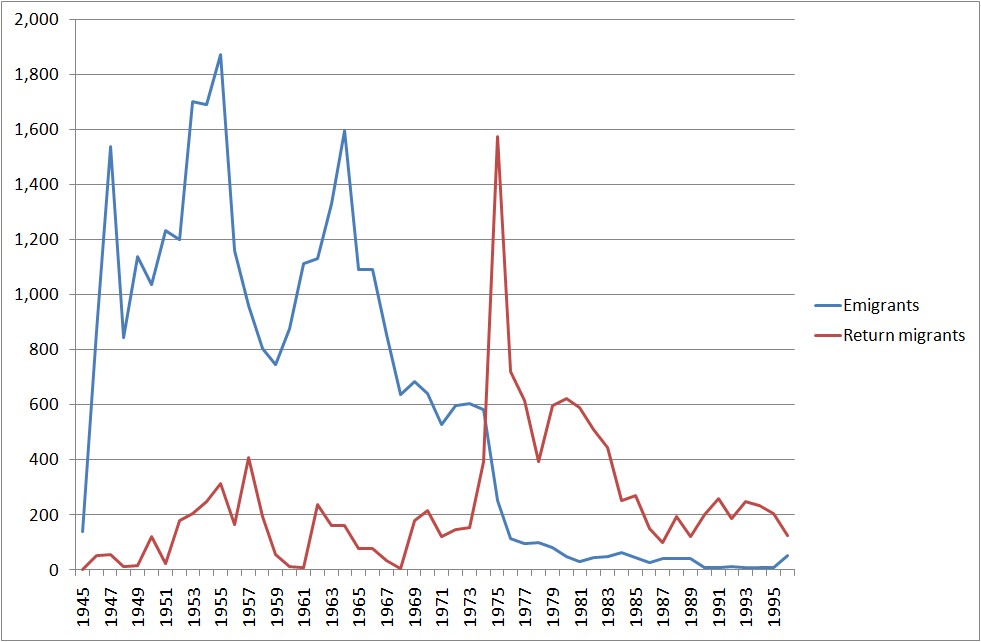
Post-World War Two migration flows from Malta to the UK

Prior to the passage of the Commonwealth Immigrants Act of 1962, there were few restrictions on Maltese migration to the UK. Malta had experienced significant emigration, particularly as a result of the collapse of a construction boom in 1907 and after World War II, when the birth rate increased significantly. Prior to World War I, though, there were very few Maltese in the UK, except for a community in Cardiff. The UK was seen as a distant and cold country by most Maltese. Between 1919 and 1929, 3,354 Maltese were recorded as sailing to the UK, with 1,445 of these returning in later years. The remainder did not necessarily all stay in the UK, however, with many subsequently moving on to Australia. Nonetheless, by 1932, a street adjoining Commercial Road in London was home to a Maltese community. Many of these Maltese people worked in London's docks. Similar communities existed around the docks in Chatham and Portsmouth. After 1962, Maltese people required vouchers to migrate to the UK, but these were relatively easy to obtain from the Emigration Department until 1971. The Emigration Department would arrange for prospective migrants to be interviewed by British firms in order to allow their passage to the UK to fill labour shortages. At this time, it was also common for Maltese women to marry British military servicemen and for Maltese to join British merchant ships. Migration statistics recorded in Malta and the UK differ in terms of the number of Maltese migrants recorded. Maltese statistics suggest that 8,282 people left Malta for the UK between 1963 and 1970 (inclusive), with 949 recorded as returning. British statistics, meanwhile, suggest that 8,110 Maltese migrants arrived in the same period, excluding students, diplomats, seamen, visitors and their families. Significant seasonal migration to the UK started in 1962. This year saw 70 Maltese women recruited to work in British fruit and vegetable canneries for six months. By 1967–69, 250 Maltese people per year were moving to the UK for seasonal work, mostly in the canning, ice cream manufacture and hotel and catering sectors. The seasonal migration of female workers was organised by the Emigrants' Commission of the Catholic Church in Malta. According to the Malta Emigration Museum, between the end of World War Two and 1996, a total of 31,489 migrants left Malta for the UK. 12,659 subsequently returned to Malta. Net migration over the period was therefore 18,830. The 2001 UK Census recorded 30,178 Maltese-born people resident in the UK. The Office for National Statistics estimates that the equivalent figure for 2009 was 28,000.

=== United States ===
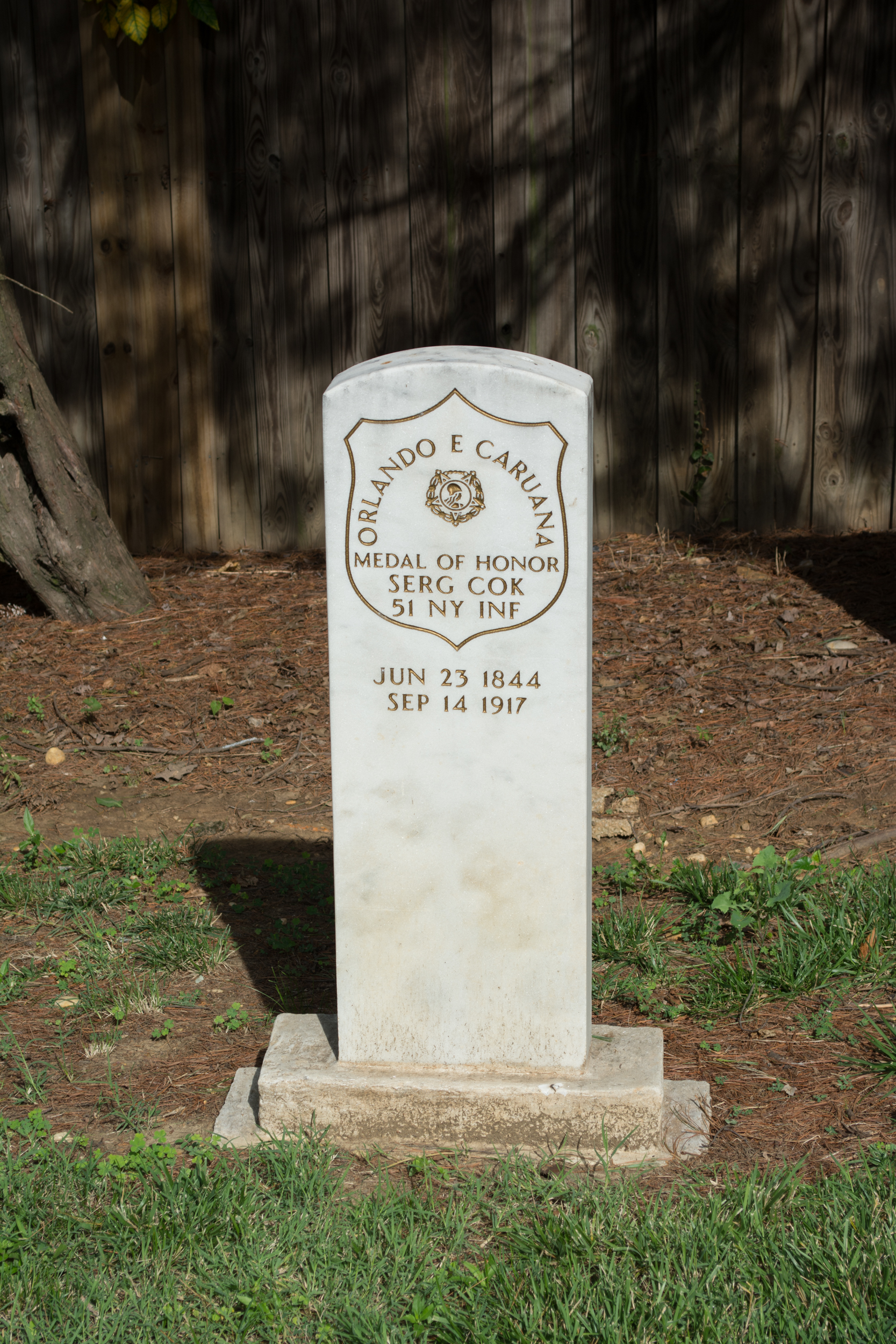
Grave of Orlando Caruana, who fought in the American Civil War.

The first immigrants from Malta to the United States arrived during the mid-eighteenth century to the city of New Orleans, Louisiana. Many Americans assumed Malta was part of Italy. In some cases "Born Malta, Italy" was put on tombstones of Maltese because of the confusion. At this time and in the nineteenth century the Maltese who emigrated to the United States were still scarce. In fact, in the 1860s, only between five and ten Maltese emigrated to the United States every year. The majority of them were agricultural workers and, in the case of New Orleans, market gardeners and vegetable dealers. After World War I, in 1919, Maltese immigration to the US increased. In the first quarter of 1920 more than 1,300 Maltese immigrated to the United States. Detroit, Michigan, with jobs in the expanding automobile industry, drew the largest share of immigrants. It is believed that in the following years, more than 15,000 Maltese people emigrated to the United States, later getting U.S. citizenship. A significant percentage of early Maltese immigrants intended to stay only temporarily for work, but many settled in the US permanently. In addition to Detroit, other industrial cities such as New York City, Los Angeles and San Francisco, California, attracted Maltese immigrants. After World War II the Maltese Government committed to pay passage costs to Maltese people who wanted to emigrate and live at least two years abroad. This program led to increased emigration by the people of the island and made up approximately 8,000 Maltese who arrived to the United States between the years 1947 and 1977. Malta's government promoted Maltese emigration because Malta was overpopulated.

The majority of Maltese immigrants arrived in the first half of the twentieth century, settling in cities like Detroit, New York City, San Francisco and Chicago. The majority of Americans of Maltese descent now live in these cities, particularly Detroit (approximately 44,000 Maltese) and New York City (more than 20,000 Maltese), in the latter city, most of the people of Maltese origin are concentrated in Astoria, Queens.

In California, a Maltese community thrives in San Pedro and Long Beach.

The 2016 American Community Survey estimated 40,820 Americans of Maltese ancestry. Of these, 24,202 have Maltese as their first ancestry. This includes Maltese-born immigrants to the United States, their American born descendants as well as numerous immigrants from other nations of Maltese origin.

As in their country of origin, Maltese Americans predominantly practice Roman Catholicism as their religion. Many are practicing Catholics, attending church every week and actively participating in their local parishes.

== Historical reception and institutional discrimination ==
Historically, Maltese emigrants experienced varying degrees of marginalisation and institutional pushback upon arrival in their host nations. This was heavily influenced by local racial policies, labour union lobbying, and the broader treatment of Southern European immigrants in the early 20th century.

=== Australia ===
The most documented instances of institutional discrimination occurred in Australia under the White Australia policy. Due to their Mediterranean appearance, British and Australian labour unions frequently categorised Maltese workers as "semi-white" or "coloured," fearing they would undercut local wages. This culminated in October 1916 when a group of 214 Maltese immigrants arriving on the French ship Gange were intentionally subjected to a dictation test in the Dutch language to ensure their failure and subsequent deportation. Following political intervention, they were prohibited from landing and instead forced to sail to Nouméa, New Caledonia, where they were exiled for three months. They were later returned to Sydney but held on a hulk before eventually being allowed entry; however, strict quotas limiting Maltese immigration were subsequently enforced.

=== North America ===
In the United States, Maltese immigrants in the early-to-mid 20th century were subjected to severe immigration quotas aimed at restricting Southern Europeans. Under the First Quota Law of 1921 and the subsequent Immigration Act of 1924, the U.S. government grouped Malta into an "Other Europe" category rather than applying the generous quotas afforded to emigrants from the United Kingdom. This resulted in an annual quota of just 14 Maltese immigrants per year, effectively halting emigration and leaving hundreds of families permanently separated.

=== North Africa ===
In regions like French Algeria, Maltese communities occupied a complex middle ground. While they enjoyed the privileges of being European passport holders in colonised nations and largely integrated into the local European communities, they were often subjected to early French anti-Maltese attitudes and viewed as working-class competitors. During the wave of decolonisation and the conclusion of the Algerian War in 1962, the Maltese population was targeted alongside other Europeans by rising anti-colonial sentiment and forced to flee the country en masse.

== See also ==
- Demographics of Malta
- Immigration to Malta
- List of countries by immigrant population
- List of sovereign states and dependent territories by fertility rate

== Bibliography ==
- French Government documents of the 1910s and 1920s on the Maltese in Tunisia and the political situation of the times
- Carmel Vassallo, Corsairing to Commerce: Maltese Merchants in XVIII Century Spain (Malta University Publishers, 1997. ISBN 99909-45-04-7).
- Romeo Cini, Tripoli of Barbary - La nostra storia (our story)
- Fr Lawrence E. Attard, Cyprus, Corfu, Constantinople and Smyrna, in: The Great Exodus by. (C) P.E.G. Ltd - 1989.
- Mark Caruana, Maltese Surnames in France: Attard
- Nicholas D Chircop OAM, A Transient Colony in the Valley of the Nile - The History of the Maltese Colony in Egypt throughout the 19th and 20th Century
- Maltese Government Reports from the Emigration Department, 1948–2015
- Almir da Silveira, Onboard towards Brazil - the Maltese immigration
- Huw R. Jones, Modern Emigration from Malta, Transactions of the Institute of British Geographers, No. 60 (Nov. 1973), pp. 101–119
