= Maltese Canadians =

- (Malta) (Canada)

Total population
- 40,670 (by ancestry, 2021 Census)

Regions with significant populations
- Toronto: 18,680

Languages
- Canadian English · Canadian French · Maltese · Italian

Religion
- Roman Catholicism

Related ethnic groups
- Maltese diaspora, Maltese Americans, Maltese Australians

Maltese Canadians are Canadian citizens of Maltese descent or Malta-born people who reside in Canada. According to the 2021 census, there were 40,670 Canadians who claimed full or partial Maltese ancestry, having an increase compared to those 37,120 in 2006.

== History ==
The Maltese emigration of significant manner occurred in 1840, followed by periods of emigration around 1907 and between 1918 and 1920. However, most Maltese emigrants settled in Canada after World War II. Most these immigrants settled in Ontario, mainly Toronto, but over time other Maltese immigrants moved to other Canadian cities including Montreal, Vancouver, and St. John's. Approximately 18,000 Maltese people emigrated to Canada between 1946 and 1981, but emigration slowly reduced over time. In 2006 only 145 people of Maltese origin settled in the country.

== Demography ==
Today, most of people of Maltese origin, some 18,680 live in Toronto (more than 50% of the total Maltese Canadian population). An area of Dundas Street West in The Junction is known as "Little Malta" due to the historic Maltese population, as well as the continued presence of Maltese clubs and businesses. There are also Maltese communities in other parts of Ontario as well as in Montreal, Quebec, Winnipeg, Manitoba and Vancouver, British Columbia.

== See also ==
- European Canadians
- Maltese Americans
- Maltese Australians
- Malta

== Bibliography ==
- Dan Brock, The Distribution of the Maltese in Canada up to the Eve of the Second World War, The Maltese Canadian Club of London Newsletter Vol 38 No. 2, July/August 2017
