= National Council for the Maltese Language =

Current Maltese language regulatory body

The National Council for the Maltese Language (Maltese: Il-Kunsill Nazzjonali tal-Ilsien Malti) was founded in April 2005 with the enactment of the Maltese Language Act in Chapter 470 of the Laws of Malta. The council is responsible for promoting the Maltese language across Malta, and developing and implementing national language policies. The council is funded by the Maltese government.

The council consists of five committees which are: Media, Education, Language Research, Translations and Terminology and the Development of Maltese in the Information and Technology Sector. Two of the council's primary responsibilities are the promotion of the Maltese language, and establishing effective bilingualism between Maltese and English. They also work to standardise and modernise the Maltese language to ensure its ability to thrive into the future. Their role as the language regulator for Maltese has been criticised by some Maltese academics as overly prescriptivist, especially for the Maltese diaspora.

The National Council for the Maltese Language is a member of the EFNIL (European Federation of National Institutions for Language) in the EU.

== See also ==
- Roderick Bovingdon
