= Malta–United Kingdom relations =

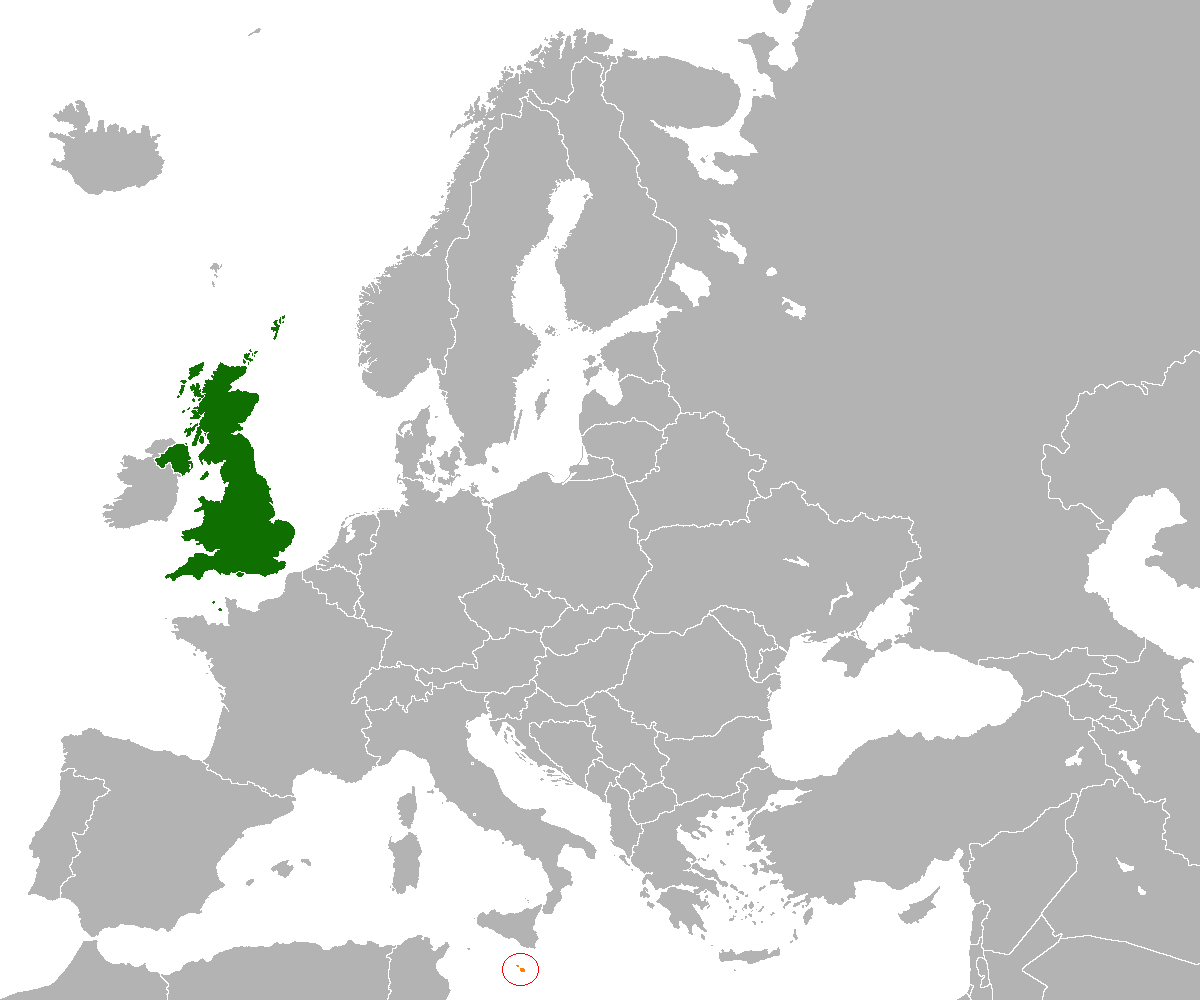

- United Kingdom: Malta

Malta–United Kingdom relations are foreign relations between Malta and the United Kingdom. The two countries share membership of the Commonwealth of Nations and shared membership of the European Union until 31 January 2020 when the UK withdrew from the bloc.

== History ==
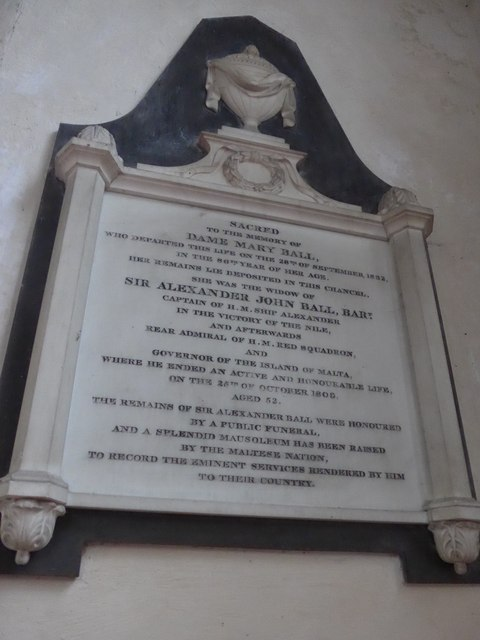
Memorial in Poynings parish church, West Sussex, to Sir Alexander Ball, the first British civil commissioner of Malta

The British took possession of Malta in 1800, defeating an unpopular French garrison that had taken possession of the islands two years earlier. Malta was established as the Malta Protectorate which de jure was supposed to be evacuated under the terms of the 1802 Treaty of Amiens. However, de facto this Protectorate lasted until Malta became a Crown Colony on 23 July 1813, when Sir Thomas Maitland was appointed as Governor of Malta. That year, Malta was granted the Bathurst Constitution. Malta's status as a Crown Colony was confirmed by the Treaty of Paris of 1814. The islands were seen as being of key strategic significance, lying between Gibraltar and the Suez Canal, and became an important shipping station on the sea route between Great Britain and British India. As a result, Malta became the headquarters of the British Mediterranean Fleet until the 1930s.

The islands were essentially under Admiralty rule until 1849, when a partly elected legislative council was formed. In 1921, this was officially replaced with a fully elected bicameral parliament, bringing Malta a degree of Home Rule within the British Empire.

During World War II, the islands were regularly bombed by Axis forces. Despite the efforts of the Regia Aeronautica and the Luftwaffe, the islands did not surrender. This is credited to the heroism of the general population of Malta, which earned them a collective George Cross, awarded by George VI in 1943. A depiction of the medal has remained on the Maltese flag to the present day (in a red fimbriation after its original blue canton was removed in 1964).

In the 1950s and 1960s, serious consideration was given in the United Kingdom and Malta to the idea of a political union between the two countries. Even though Malta supported integration in a 1956 referendum, the plans for it floundered and Malta gained its independence from the United Kingdom in 1964. The British monarch, Queen Elizabeth II, remained Queen of Malta until the country became a republic in 1974.

After independence, a defence agreement, coupled with a financial aid package, allowed the continued use of Malta by British armed forces and the island was the Mediterranean headquarters of NATO. In 1971, the new prime minister of Malta, Dom Mintoff, cancelled the agreement resulting in the withdrawal of British forces, but in March 1972, a further agreement was reached at Marlborough House in London, for the use of British bases on Malta for a further seven years. All British forces finally withdrew on 31 March 1979, an event commemorated by the Freedom Day national holiday.

There is a small Maltese community in the United Kingdom. In addition, the British overseas territory of Gibraltar has been influenced by significant immigration from Malta in the 18th and 19th century.

Since the Brexit referendum, the number of applications for Maltese citizenship by British citizens, based on either family link or long-term residence, has seen a spike from 382 in 2016 to 619 in 2017 and 704 in the first 10 months of 2018. Malta remains a popular tourist destination for British holidaymakers, with 640,570 arrivals from the United Kingdom in 2017.

== Diplomatic relations ==
- Malta has a high commission in London
- The United Kingdom has a high commission in Valletta.
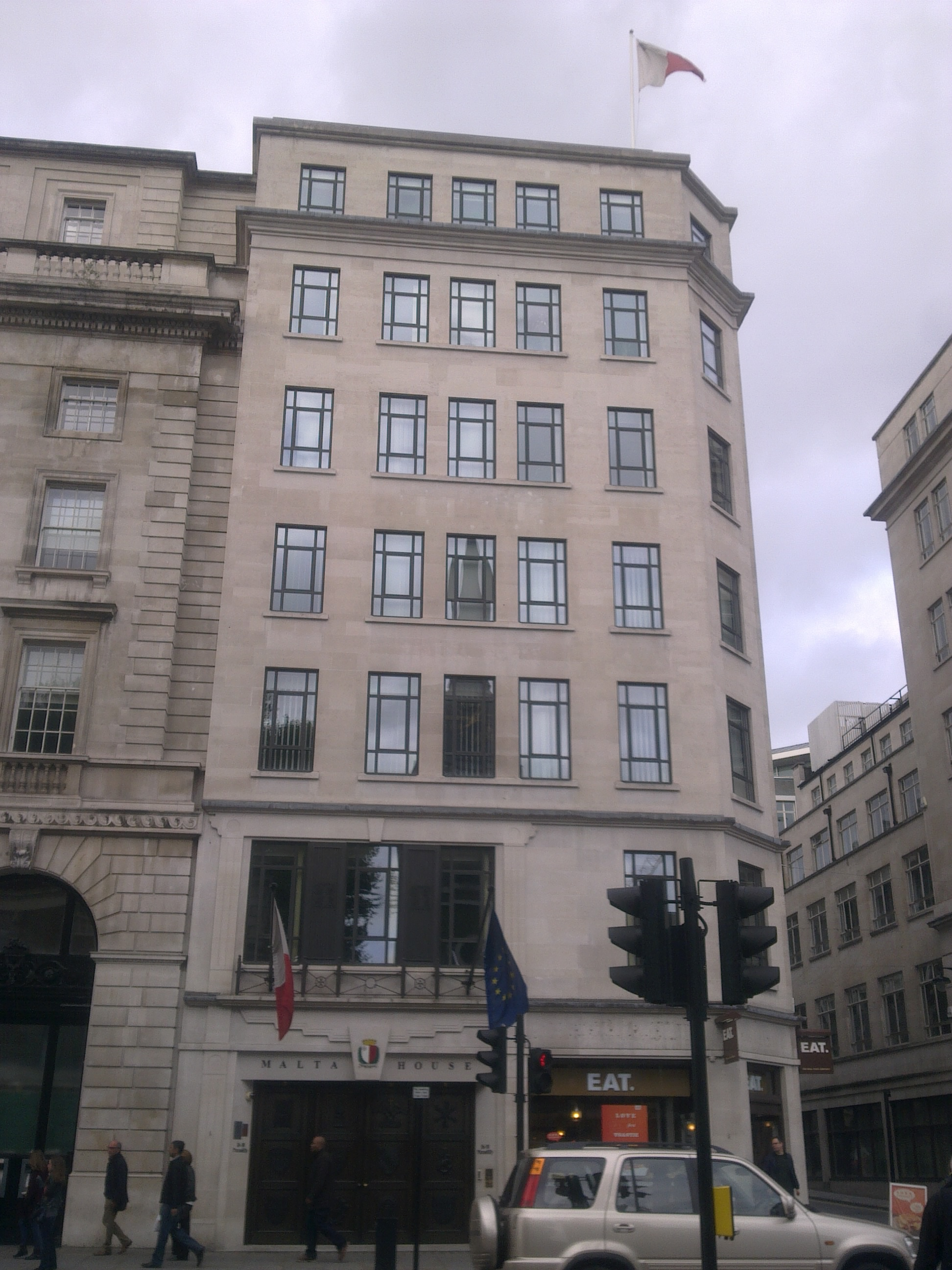
High Commission of Malta in London

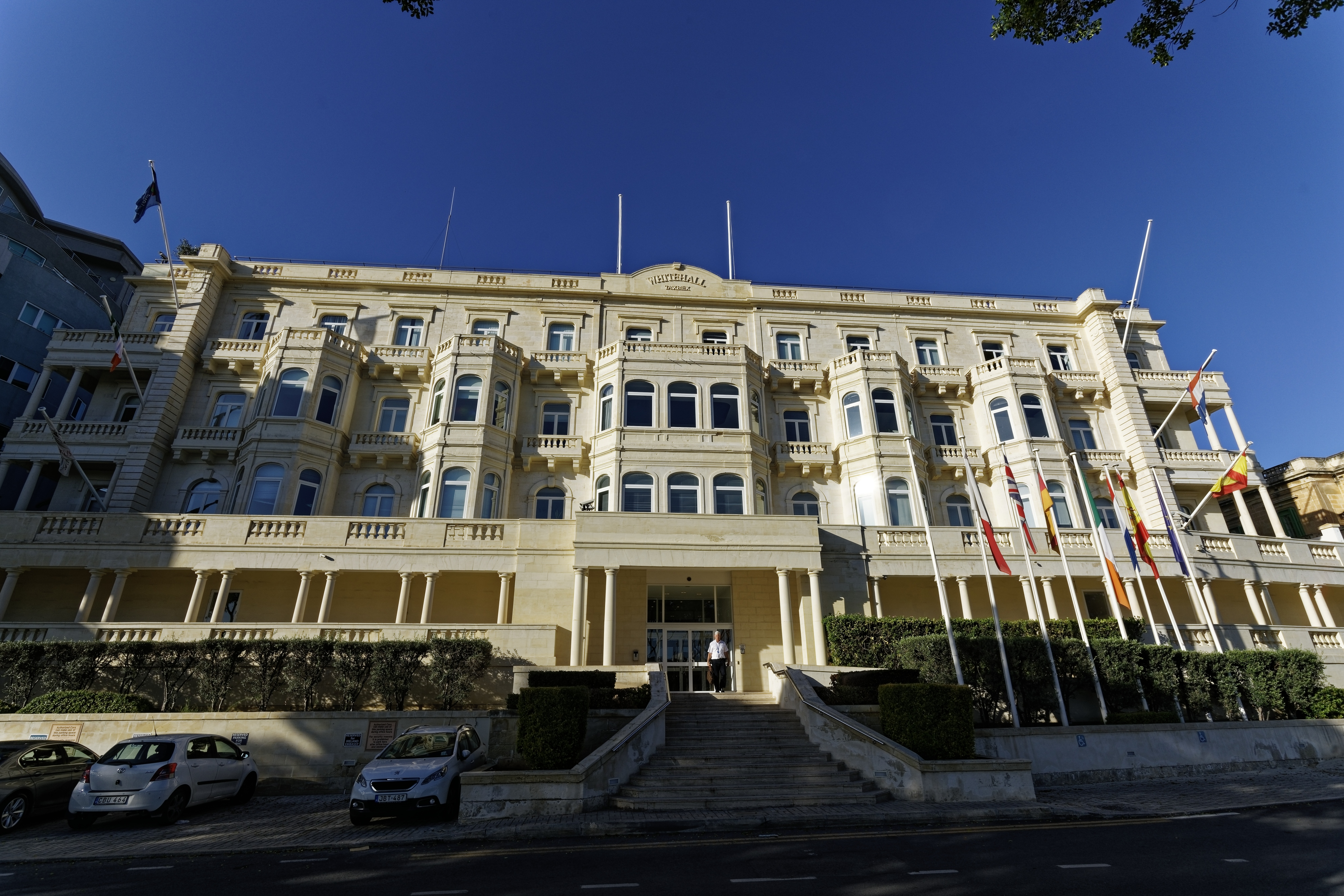
High Commission of the United Kingdom in Valletta

== Economic relations ==
Trade between the United Kingdom and Malta is governed by the EU–UK Trade and Cooperation Agreement since 1 January 2021.

As of 2025, UK exports to Malta amounted to £2.7 billion, while UK imports from Malta amounted to £1.6 billion, making Malta the UK's 51st largest trading partner, making up 0.2% of UK trade.

== See also ==
- Foreign relations of Malta
- Foreign relations of the United Kingdom
- Maltese people in the United Kingdom
