= John Gibson Wright =

John Gibson Wright (c. 1837 – November 2, 1890) was a Union Army officer during the American Civil War.

Wright was born in New York in about 1837. He was a builder before the Civil War.

Wright started his military service as a private in the New York Militia on April 26, 1861. He was mustered out of the volunteers on June 3, 1861. He re-enlisted and was appointed captain of Company A of the 51st New York Volunteer Infantry Regiment on October 8, 1861. He was promoted to major on March 14, 1863.

During the war, Wright served as an assistant adjutant general, assistant inspector general, and provost marshal for the regiment. As assistant engineer on Major General Ambrose Burnside's staff, Wright superintended the building of the earthworks of the Ninth Corps at Petersburg, Virginia.

Wright was captured at the Battle of Peebles' Farm, during the siege of Petersburg on September 30, 1864. He was exchanged in February 1865. After he was exchanged, Wright took command of Camp Auger, near Alexandria, Virginia.

Wright was appointed lieutenant colonel, April 20, 1865, and colonel, May 18, 1865. He was mustered out of the volunteers with his regiment on July 25, 1865. On February 24, 1866, President Andrew Johnson nominated Wright for appointment to the grade of brevet brigadier general of volunteers, to rank from March 13, 1865, and the United States Senate confirmed the appointment on April 10, 1866.

After the war, Wright was a road and railroad contractor in the New York City and St. Louis areas.

Gibson's wife predeceased him. His obituary notes that he had two sons in Scotland at the date of his death. Gibson died in New York City on November 2, 1890. He is buried at Mount Pleasant Cemetery in Newark, New Jersey.

== See also ==
- List of American Civil War brevet generals (Union)
