= Lou Drofenik =

Maltese-Australian novelist and academic

Lou Drofenik (born Lou Zammit, 1941) is a Maltese-Australian novelist and academic. She lives in Victoria, Australia.

== Life ==
Drofenik was born in Birkirkara, Malta. Her father was a stonemason. She completed her primary and secondary education in Malta, and taught at the Siġġiewi primary school before migrating to Australia in 1962 under the Single Women's Migrant Scheme. She followed undergraduate and graduate degrees in education at La Trobe University, and pursued her doctoral studies at the same university, focusing on the effects of migration on the moral identity of Maltese migrant women in Australia. Since then, she has worked as an educator in the Australian Catholic primary school system.

She is married, and has four children and eight grandchildren.

== Awards and honours ==
She is the recipient of three Malta National Book Council Awards - in 2008 for In Search of Carmen Caruana in the category of Novel or Short Story in English, in 2010 for Cast the Long Shadow in the category of Novel in Another Language, and in 2017 for The Confectioner's Daughter in the category of Novel in Maltese or English. Two of her novels - Of Cloves and Bitter Almonds and Beloved Convict - were also awarded the Australian North Central Literary Award.

== Work ==
Drofenik has published eight novels. Her fiction is founded on extensive historical research, and focuses on the migrant experience, specifically in a Maltese-Australian context. Her work is notable for its engagement with questions of Maltese and migrant identity, and has been praised for its engagement with female perspectives and experiences in distinction to the "predominantly patriarchal outlook" of much of the Maltese literary tradition.

=== List of publications ===
- Birds of Passage (self-published, 2005: ISBN 9780646434094)
- In Search of Carmen Caruana (self-published, 2007: ISBN 9780646469461)
- Of Cloves and Bitter Almonds (National Biographic, 2008: ISBN 9780980337624)
- Cast the Long Shadow (National Biographic, 2010: ISBN 9780980632378)
- Beloved Convict (Maltese Historical Society, 2011: ISBN 9780646568706)
- Bushfire Summer (self-published, 2013: ISBN 9780646913926)
- The Confectioner's Daughter (Horizons, 2016: ISBN 978-99957-63-15-2)
- Love in the Time of the Inquisition (Horizons, 2017)
