= Maltese Americans =

Americans of Maltese birth or descent

Maltese Americans Maltin Amerikani
Total population
- 37,440 (2024)

Regions with significant populations
- Detroit, New York City, San Francisco, New Orleans and Chicago

Languages
- English, Maltese, Maltese Italian

Religion
- Catholic Church

Related ethnic groups
- Italian Americans, Sicilian Americans, Corsican American, Maltese Canadians, Maltese Australians, British Maltese

Maltese Americans (Maltese: Maltin Amerikani or Maltin tal-Amerika) are Americans with Maltese ancestry.

== History ==
The first immigrants from Malta to the United States arrived during the mid-eighteenth century to the city of New Orleans, Louisiana. Many Americans assumed Malta was part of Italy. In some cases "Born Malta, Italy" was put on tombstones of Maltese because of the confusion.

=== 20th century ===
After World War I, in 1919, Maltese immigration to the US increased. In the first quarter of 1920 more than 1,300 Maltese immigrated to the United States. Detroit, Michigan, with jobs in the expanding automobile industry, drew the largest share of immigrants. It is believed that in the following years, more than 15,000 Maltese people emigrated to the United States, later getting U.S. citizenship.

A significant percentage of early Maltese immigrants intended to stay only temporarily for work, but many settled in the US permanently. In addition to Detroit, other industrial cities such as New York City, San Francisco, and Chicago attracted Maltese immigrants.

After World War II the Maltese government committed to pay passage costs to Maltese people who wanted to emigrate and live at least two years abroad. This program led to increased emigration by the people of the island and made up approximately 8,000 Maltese who arrived to the United States between the years 1947 and 1977. Malta's government promoted Maltese emigration because Malta was overpopulated.

== Demography ==
Estimates of the number of Maltese immigrants and their descendants living in the US by 1990 have been as high as 70,000. The majority of Americans of Maltese descent continued to live in the same cities where immigration had taken place, particularly Detroit (approximately 44,000 Maltese) and New York City (more than 20,000 Maltese); in the latter, most of the people of Maltese origin are concentrated in Astoria, Queens. San Francisco and Chicago also have significant populations.

The 2019 American Community Survey estimated that there were 42,058 Americans of Maltese ancestry living in the United States. Of these, 14,078 have Maltese as their only ancestry. This includes Maltese born immigrants to the United States, their American-born descendants as well as numerous immigrants from other nations of Maltese origin. Around 6,506 of them are foreign born.

== Religion ==
As in their country of origin, Maltese Americans predominantly practice Roman Catholicism as their religion. Many are practicing Catholics, attending church every week and actively participating in their local parishes.

== Notable people ==
- Rosemarie Aquilina, judge
- Kyle Balda, animator and film director
- Joseph Borg, financial regulator
- James J. Busuttil, international law scholar and company director
- Joseph Anthony Buttigieg II, literary scholar and translator
- Pete Buttigieg, former mayor of South Bend, Indiana, 2020 presidential candidate, US Secretary of Transportation
- Ray Buttigieg, Musician, composer, producer and poet
- Joseph Calleia, actor and singer
- Orlando E. Caruana, Medal of Honor winner in American Civil War
- Darrin Q. Camilleri, member of the Michigan House of Representatives
- Alex DeBrincat, hockey player
- Aaron Falzon, basketball player
- Tevin Falzon, basketball player
- Danielle Fishel, actress
- Nazzareno Formosa, Roman-Catholic priest
- Joseph Lapira, professional soccer player
- Joe Sacco, cartoonist and journalist
- Britney Spears, singer
- Bryan Spears, film and television producer
- Jamie Lynn Spears, actress and singer
- Lynne Spears, author
- Jenise Spiteri, snowboarder
- Charlie Williams, professional soccer player
- Frank Zarb, businessman and politician

== See also ==
- European Americans
- Hyphenated American
- Malta–United States relations
