= 51st New York Infantry Regiment =

- Active: July 27, 1861 to July 25, 1865
- Country: United States
- Allegiance: Union
- Branch: Union Army
- Type: Infantry
- Engagements: Battle of Roanoke Island; Battle of New Bern; Second Battle of Bull Run; Battle of Chantilly; Battle of South Mountain; Battle of Antietam; Battle of Fredericksburg; Siege of Vicksburg; Siege of Jackson; Rapidan Campaign; Battle of the Wilderness; Battle of Spotsylvania Court House; Battle of North Anna; Battle of Totopotomoy Creek; Battle of Cold Harbor; Siege of Petersburg; Battle of Globe Tavern; Battle of Boydton Plank Road; Battle of Fort Stedman; Appomattox Campaign; Third Battle of Petersburg

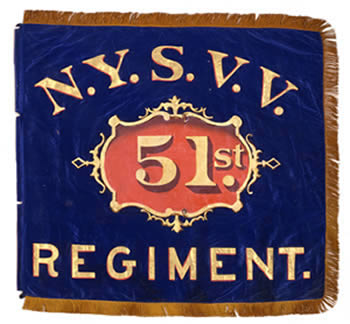
51st Regimental colors.

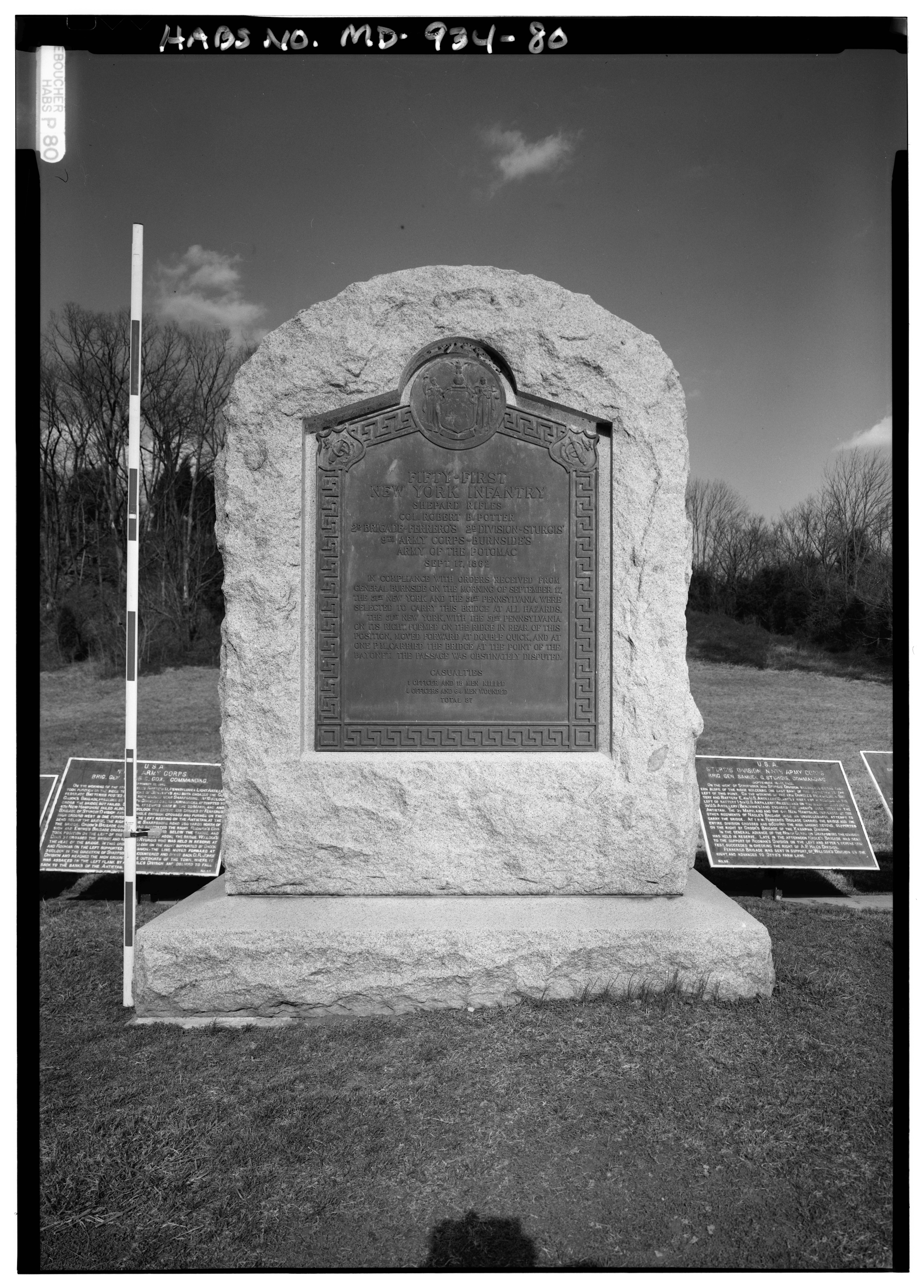
51st New York Volunteer Infantry monument at Antietam National Battlefield

The 51st New York Infantry Regiment (or Shepard Rifles) was an infantry regiment in the Union Army during the American Civil War.

== Service ==
The 51st New York Infantry was organized at New York City, New York beginning July 27, 1861 and mustered in for a three-year enlistment on October 23, 1861 under the command of Colonel Edward Ferrero.

The regiment was attached to Reno's 2nd Brigade, Burnside's North Carolina Expeditionary Corps, to April 1862. 2nd Brigade, 2nd Division, Department of North Carolina, to July 1862. 2nd Brigade, 2nd Division, IX Corps, Army of the Potomac, to April 1863. Army of the Ohio to June 1863. Army of the Tennessee to August 1863. Army of the Ohio, to September 1863. District of North Central Kentucky, 1st Division, XXIII Corps, Army of the Ohio, to February 1864. 2nd Brigade, 2nd Division, IX Corps, Army of the Potomac, to April 1864. 1st Brigade, 2nd Division, IX Corps, Army of the Potomac, to May 26, 1864. Engineers, 2nd Division, IX Corps, to July 2, 1864. 1st Brigade, 2nd Division, IX Corps, to July 1865.

The 51st New York Infantry mustered out of service on July 25, 1865.

== Detailed service ==
Left State for Annapolis, Md., October 29. Duty at Annapolis, Md., until January 6, 1862. Burnside's Expedition to Hatteras Inlet and Roanoke, Island, N.C., January 6-February 7, 1862. Battle of Roanoke Island February 8. Duty at Roanoke Island until March 11. Movement to New Bern, N.C., March 11–13. Battle of New Bern March 14. Expedition to Elizabeth City April 17–19. Duty at New Bern until July. Moved to Newport News, Va., July 6–9, then to Fredericksburg August 2–4. Marched to the relief of Pope, August 12–15. Pope's Campaign in northern Virginia August 16-September 2. Kelly's Ford August 21. Sulphur Springs August 23–24. Plains of Manassas August 27–29. Battle of Groveton August 29. Second Battle of Bull Run August 30. Chantilly September 1. Maryland Campaign September 6–22. Battle of Frederick City September 12. Battle of South Mountain September 14. Battle of Antietam September 16–17. At Pleasant Valley until October 27. Marched to Falmouth, Va., October 27-November 17. Jefferson November 11. Sulphur Springs November 13. Warrenton November 15. Battle of Fredericksburg December 12–15. "Mud March" January 20–24, 1863. Moved to Newport News, Va., February 19, then to Covington and Paris, Ky., March 26-April 1. Moved to Mt. Sterling, Ky., April 3, to Lancaster May 6–7, and to Crab Orchard May 23. Movement to Vicksburg, Miss., June 3–17. Siege of Vicksburg June 17-July 4. Advance on Jackson, Miss., July 5–10. Siege of Jackson July 10–17. Destruction of railroad at Madison Station July 19–22. At Milldale until August 6. Moved to Cincinnati, Ohio, August 6–20, then to Nicholasville, Ky. Provost duty in District of Kentucky, Department of the Ohio, to February 1864. Veterans on furlough March–April. Moved to Annapolis, Md., and rejoined corps. Campaign from the Rapidan to the James May 3-June 15. Battle of the Wilderness May 5–7. Spotsylvania May 8–12. Po River May 10. Ny River May 12. Spotsylvania Court House May 12–21. Assault on the Salient May 22. North Anna River May 23–26. On line of the Pamunkey May 26–28. Totopotomoy May 28–31. Cold Harbor June 1–12. Bethesda Church June 1–3. Before Petersburg June 16–18. Siege of Petersburg June 16, 1864 to April 2, 1865. Mine Explosion, Petersburg, July 30, 1864. Weldon Railroad August 18–21. Poplar Grove Church, Peeble's Farm September 29-October 2. Boydton Plank Road, Hatcher's Run, October 27–28. Fort Stedman, Petersburg, March 25, 1865. Appomattox Campaign March 28-April 9. Assault on and fall of Petersburg April 2. Pursuit of Lee to Farmville April 3–9. Moved to Petersburg, then to City Point and Washington, D.C., April 20–28. Grand Review of the Armies May 23. Duty at Washington, D.C., and Alexandria, Va., until July.

== Casualties ==
The regiment lost a total of 378 men during service; 9 officers and 193 enlisted men killed or mortally wounded, 2 officers and 174 enlisted men died of disease.

== Commanders ==
- Colonel Edward Ferrero
- Colonel Robert Brown Potter
- Colonel Charles Le Gendre
- Colonel Gilbert McKibben
- Colonel John Gibson Wright

== Notable members ==
- Sergeant Orlando E. Caruana, Company K - Medal of Honor recipient for actions at the Battle of New Bern and the Battle of South Mountain
- Major George W. Whitman - brother of poet Walt Whitman

== See also ==
- List of New York Civil War regiments
- New York in the Civil War
