= Maltralian =

Dialect of Maltese in Australia

- Australian Maltese
- Il-Maltraljan
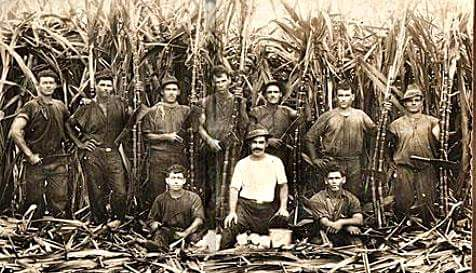
- Maltese cane workers in Queensland.
- Native to: Australia
- Ethnicity: Maltese Australians
- Language family: Afro-Asiatic: Semitic; West Semitic; Central Semitic; Arabic; Maghrebi Arabic; Pre-Hilalian; Sicilian Arabic; Maltese; Maltralian
- Writing system: Maltese alphabet

Language codes
- ISO 639-3: –
- IETF: mt-AU
- Maltese people in Australia according to the 2011 census.

Maltralian or Australian Maltese (in Maltese: Il-Maltraljan) is the Maltese language of Australia, spoken by Maltese Australians in the country.

The development of the Maltese language in a country far removed from Malta continued, in an environment that maintained a sense of origin and culture.

== History of Maltese emigrants to Australia ==
In 1882 Australia welcomed the first official group of immigrants from Malta, 8 immigrants sent there as part of an experiment conducted by the Maltese Imperial Government. 40 years after that first emigration to Australia, emigration began on a larger scale. Between 1911 and 1939 6,000 Maltese people emigrated to Australia and in the ten years between 1940 and 1949 numbers rose to 8,000. In the twenty years after 1949 Australia welcomed over 61,000 emigrants. 1956 saw 10,300 emigrants from Malta enter Australia. Later numbers of emigrants decreased.

== Origins of a new Maltese dialect ==
The first trace of a change in the Maltese language in Australia was evidenced in 1929 with the publication of Charles Parnis's books, the first Maltese journalist in Australia. These writings included various expressions and vocabulary not included in standard Maltese. This documentation of an Australian-Maltese dialect in journals suggest that its origins go back before 1929.

After these first publications in Maltese by Charles Parnis and some other writers who wrote from 1929 to 1935, there was a pause in work published by Australian-Maltese authors, due to the Second World War. Publication of Australian-Maltese works resumed (in the Maltese language) after 1949, in Melbourne.

== Characteristics ==
The Maltese language in Australia developed a different style from the Standard Maltese, in part due to the Australian social environment.

Maltralian divergences from standard Maltese include:

- The word blaġa 'bludger', a masculine and feminine noun, with the verb ibblaġġja, neither of which occur in Standard Maltese.
- Maltese words developed a new format like iddmanda 'to demand' from the Maltese word tiddomanda.
- Words like kejn/kejna rather than kannamieli or blinka 'blinker' but not the Standard Maltese indikejter 'indicator'.
- Standard Maltese uses appoġġja or għen for 'help', but Maltralian uses rifed.
- Standard Maltese uses bank for 'bank', but Maltralian uses mislef.
- There is a lack of Italian influence in the Maltralian dialect, unlike Standard Maltese, for example ċaw ('bye') is not used but saħħa is, awguri ('congratulations') is not used but nifraħlek or nixtieqlek ir-risq are. However, these Semitic expressions are still present in Standard Maltese.
- For futbol 'football' in Maltralian use soker, not traditionally used in Standard Maltese.
- The plural of dar 'home' in Maltese is djar 'homes', but in Maltralian the plural of dar is djars, darsijiet or djarsijiet. For buttuna 'button' the Standard Maltese plural buttuni is not used, in favour of btaten. Tifla 'girl' does not have the Standard Maltese plural bniet but tifliet.
- The word 'cheap' in Maltese is irħis 'cheap' and irħas 'cheaper', but in Maltralian iċep and iċjep are used.
