= Maltese people =

Ethnic group native to Malta

Maltin
- Map of Maltese diaspora

Total population
- c.400,000–700,000^{[a]}

Regions with significant populations
- Malta 404,113
- Australia: 210,000
- Canada: 41,920
- United States: 40,820 (2016)
- United Kingdom: 40,230 (Maltese-born)
- Italy: 31,000
- South Africa: 1,000
- Germany: 1,000
- Turkey: ~1,000–2,000
- Tunisia: < 200 (many resettled in Malta after the 1950s)
- Brazil: 132 (2025)

Languages
- Maltese; English • Italian

Religion
- Predominantly Latin Catholicism
- ^{a} The total figure is merely an estimation from all the referenced populations.

The Maltese (Maltese: Maltin) people are an ethnic group native to Malta who speak Maltese, a Semitic language descended from Siculo-Arabic with a substantial Romance superstratum, and share a common Maltese history and culture characterised by Latin Catholicism, which remains the state religion. Malta, an island country in the Mediterranean Sea, is an archipelago that also includes an island of the same name together with the islands of Gozo (Maltese: Għawdex) and Comino (Maltese: Kemmuna); people of Gozo, Gozitans (Maltese: Għawdxin) are considered a subgroup of the Maltese.

== History ==
The current Maltese people, characterised by the use of the Maltese language and by Latin Catholicism, are the descendants – through much mixing – of colonists from Sicily and Calabria who repopulated the Maltese islands in the beginning of the second millennium after a two-century lapse of depopulation that followed the Ifriqiyian conquest by the Aghlabids in AD 870. A genetic study by Capelli et al. indicates that Malta was barely inhabited at the turn of the tenth century and was likely to have been repopulated by settlers from Sicily and Calabria who spoke Siculo-Arabic. Previous inhabitants of the islands – Phoenicians, Romans, Byzantines – did not leave many traces, as most place names were lost and replaced. The Normans conquered the island in 1091 and completely re-Christianised them by 1249. This re-Christianisation created the conditions for the evolution of the Maltese language from the now extinct Siculo-Arabic dialect.

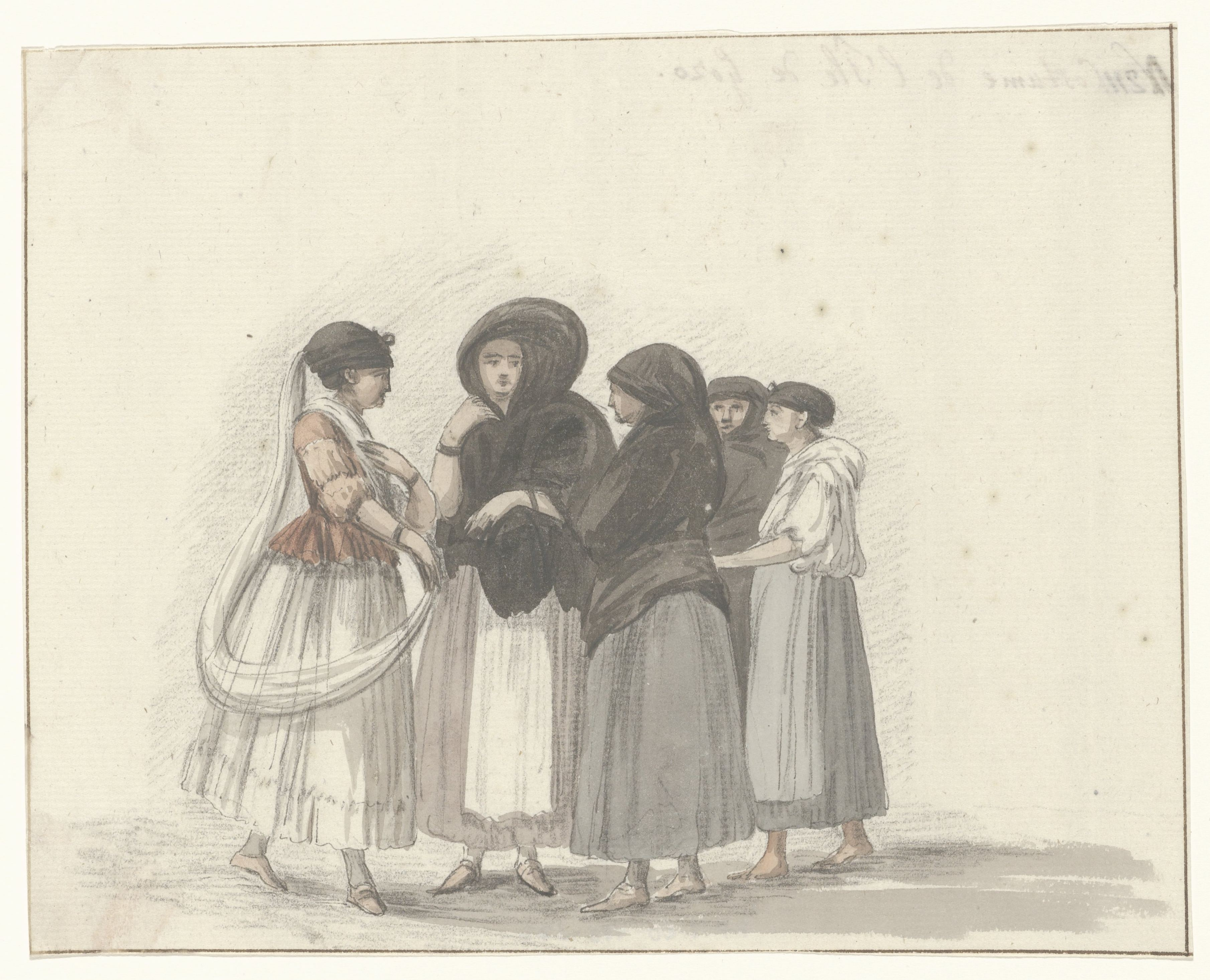
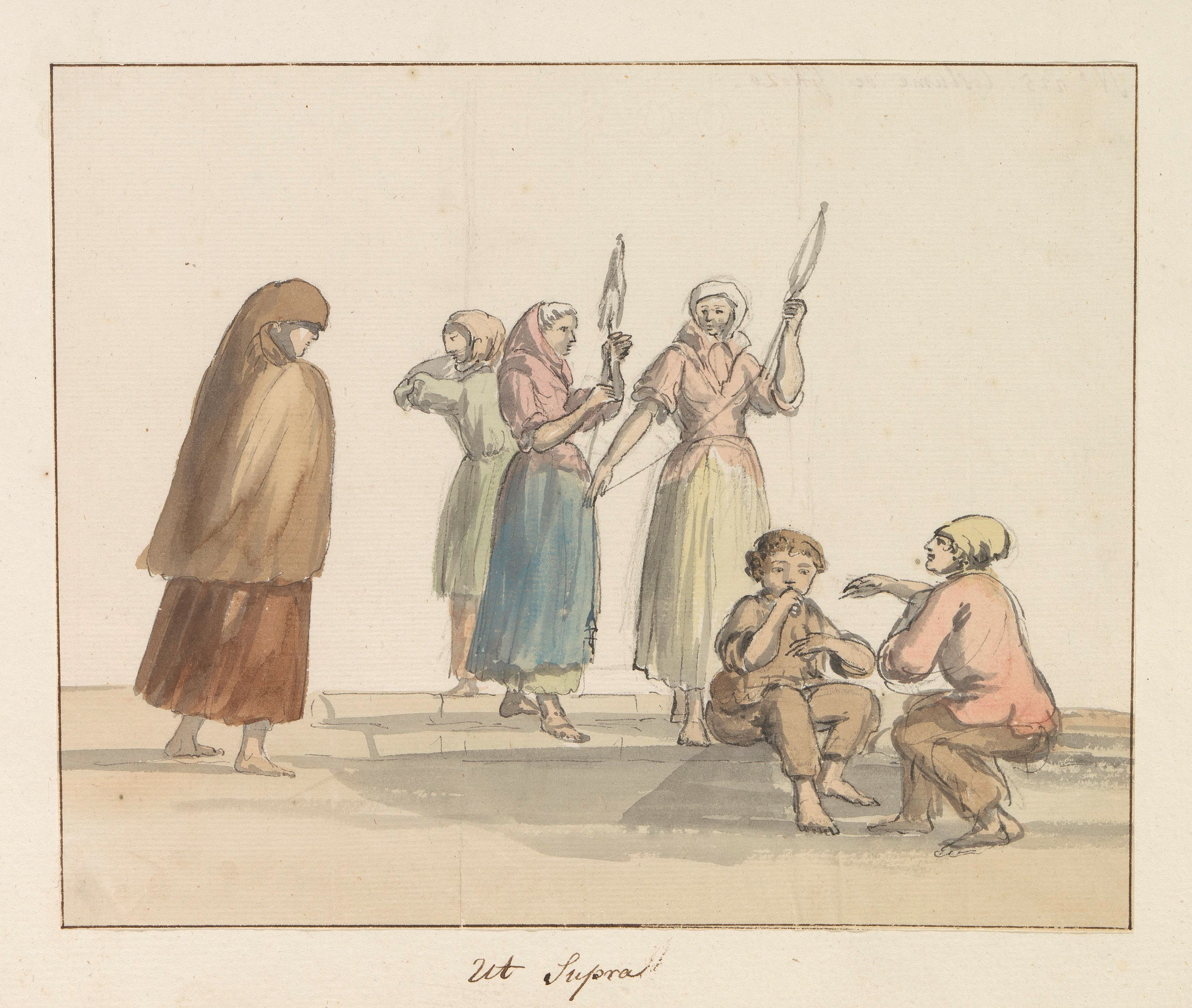
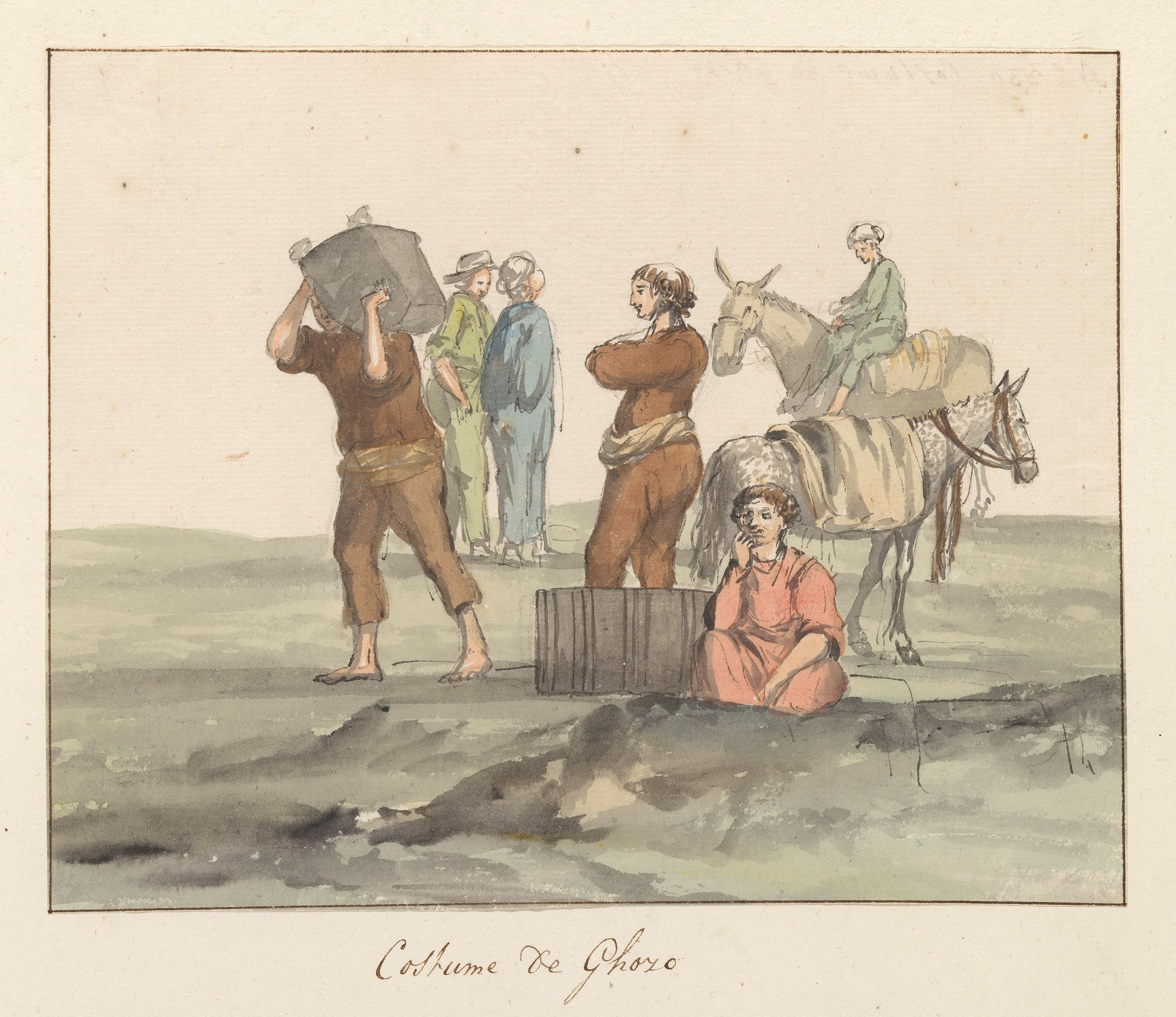
18th century paintings by Abraham-Louis-Rodolphe Ducros showing people from Gozo wearing traditional clothing

The influences on the population after this have been fiercely debated among historians and geneticists. The origins question is complicated by numerous factors, including Malta's turbulent history of invasions and conquests, with long periods of depopulation followed by periods of immigration to Malta and intermarriage with the Maltese by foreigners from the Mediterranean, Western and Southern European countries that ruled Malta. The many demographic influences on the island include:

- The exile to Malta of the entire male population of the town of Celano (Italy) in 1223
- The removal of all remaining North African Muslims from Malta in 1224
- The stationing of Swabian and Sicilian troops on Malta in 1240
- Further waves of European repopulation throughout the 13th century
- The arrival of several thousand Aragonese (i.e. Catalans, Valencians, Majorcans, and proper Aragonese, from current Spain) soldiers in 1283 to 1425.
- The settlement in Malta of noble families from Sicily and the Crown of Aragon (now mostly part of Spain) between 1372 and 1450
- The arrival of several thousand Greek Rhodian sailors, soldiers and slaves with the Knights of St. John in 1530
- The introduction of several thousand Sicilian laborers in 1551 and again in 1566
- The exile to Malta of anti-Uniate Serbian Orthodox clergy formerly of the Eparchy of Marča in 1670
- The emigration of some 891 Italian exiles to Malta during the Risorgimento in 1849
- The posting of some 22,000 British servicemen in Malta from 1807 to 1979 (only a small number of whom remained in the islands), as well as other British and Irish who settled in Malta over the decades
- The mass emigration occurring after World War II and continuing well into the 1960s and 1970s. Many Maltese left the island for the United Kingdom, Australia, Canada and the United States. Following Malta's accession to the European Union in 2004 expatriate communities grew in European countries such as in Belgium.

Over time, the various rulers of Malta published their own view of the ethnicity of the population. The Knights of Malta downplayed the historic period of Islam in Malta and promoted the idea of a continuous Roman Catholic presence on the islands. and the British colonial rule disregarded a genetic and cultural connection between the Maltese and Italians in an attempt to counteract growing Italian irredentism in Malta.

== Genetics ==
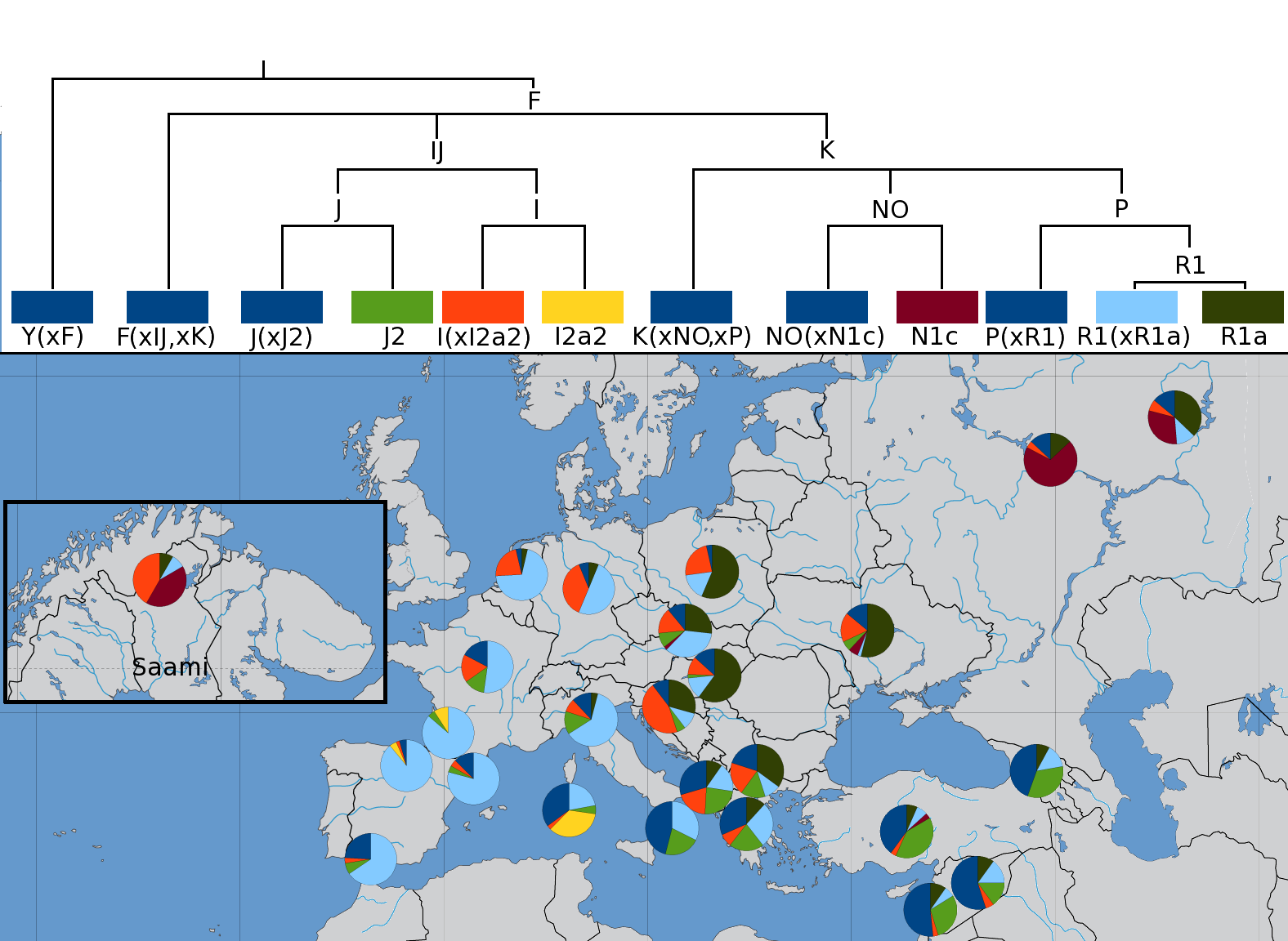
Y-Chromosome distributions in Europe. The Maltese people have a similar Y-DNA haplogroups distribution as Southern Italians

=== Paternal lineages ===
According to Capelli et al. (2005), Y-DNA haplogroups are found at the following frequencies in Malta: R1 (35.55% including 32.2% R1b), J (28.90% including 21.10% J2 and 7.8% J1), I (12.20%), E (11.10% including 8.9% E1b1b), F (6.70%), K (4.40%), P (1.10%). R1 and I haplogroups are typical in West European and North European populations while J and E1b1b (and their various subclades) consist of lineages with differential distribution across Europe and the Mediterranean. The study by Capelli et al. has concluded that the contemporary males of Malta most likely originated from Southern Italy and that there is a minuscule input from the Eastern Mediterranean. The study also indicates that Malta was barely inhabited at the turn of the tenth century and was likely to have been repopulated by settlers from Sicily and Calabria who spoke Siculo-Arabic. These findings confirm the onomastic and linguistic evidence presented in 1993 by Geoffrey Hull, who traced the oldest Maltese surnames to southern and south-eastern Sicily, especially the Agrigento district.

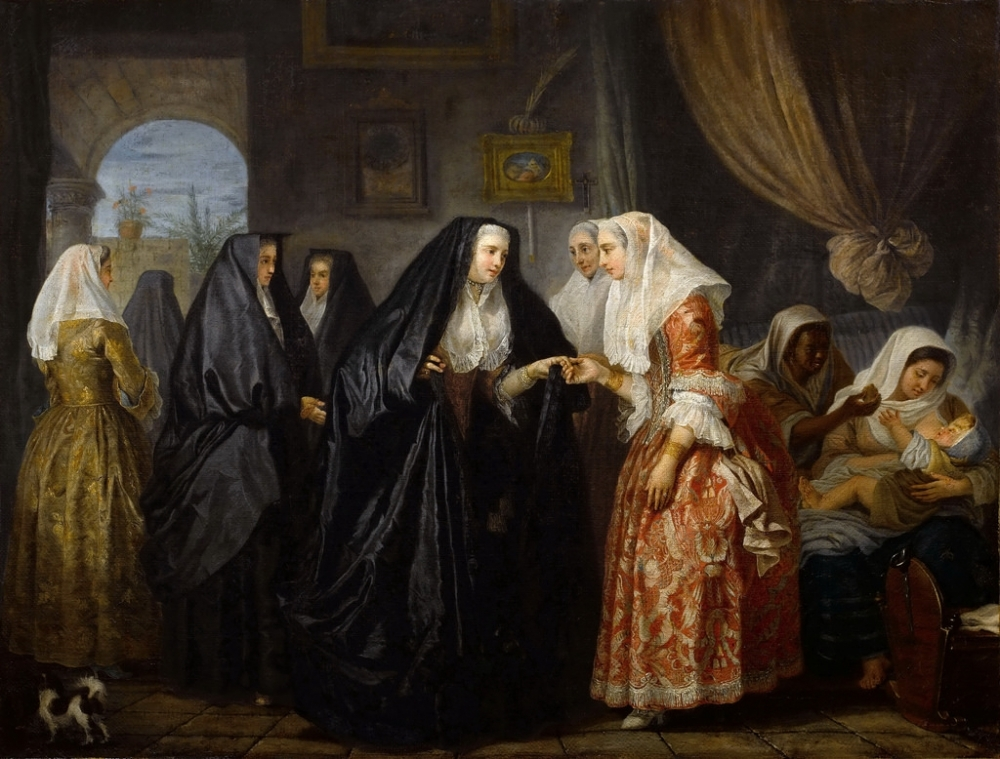
Painting of Maltese ladies by French artist Antoine de Favray during the Hospitaller Period of Malta.

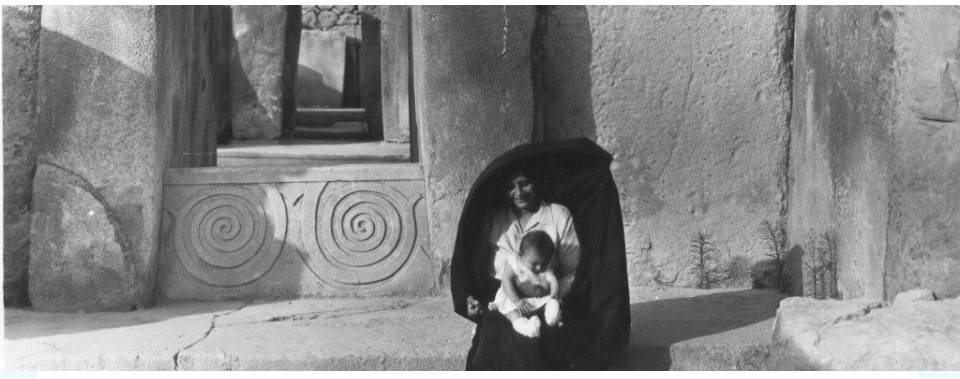
Maltese women have historically worn the għonnella, a traditional dress which became a symbol of Maltese identity. The għonnella gradually disappeared in everyday Maltese apparel after the 1960s.

Another study carried out by geneticists Spencer Wells and Pierre Zalloua et al. in 2008 claimed that more than 50% of Y-chromosomes from Maltese men could have Phoenician origins. Another study contested these conclusions, claiming that Levantine Phoenicians made little genetic contribution in the central and western Mediterranean. The authors suggest that no single Y-dna haplogroup can serve as an effective marker for Phoenician expansion.

=== Autosomal DNA ===
According to a 2014 study by Iosif Lazaridis et al., the genetic makeup of most European populations is a mixture of three ancestral sources: Western Hunter-Gatherer, Ancient North Eurasian and Early European Farmer, but this model does not work well for two sets of European populations, one of which comprises Sicilians, Maltese, and Ashkenazi Jews, which have more Near Eastern-related ancestry than can be explained by EEF admixture. They "also cannot be jointly fit with other Europeans", and "fall in the gap between European and Near Easterners".

== Culture ==
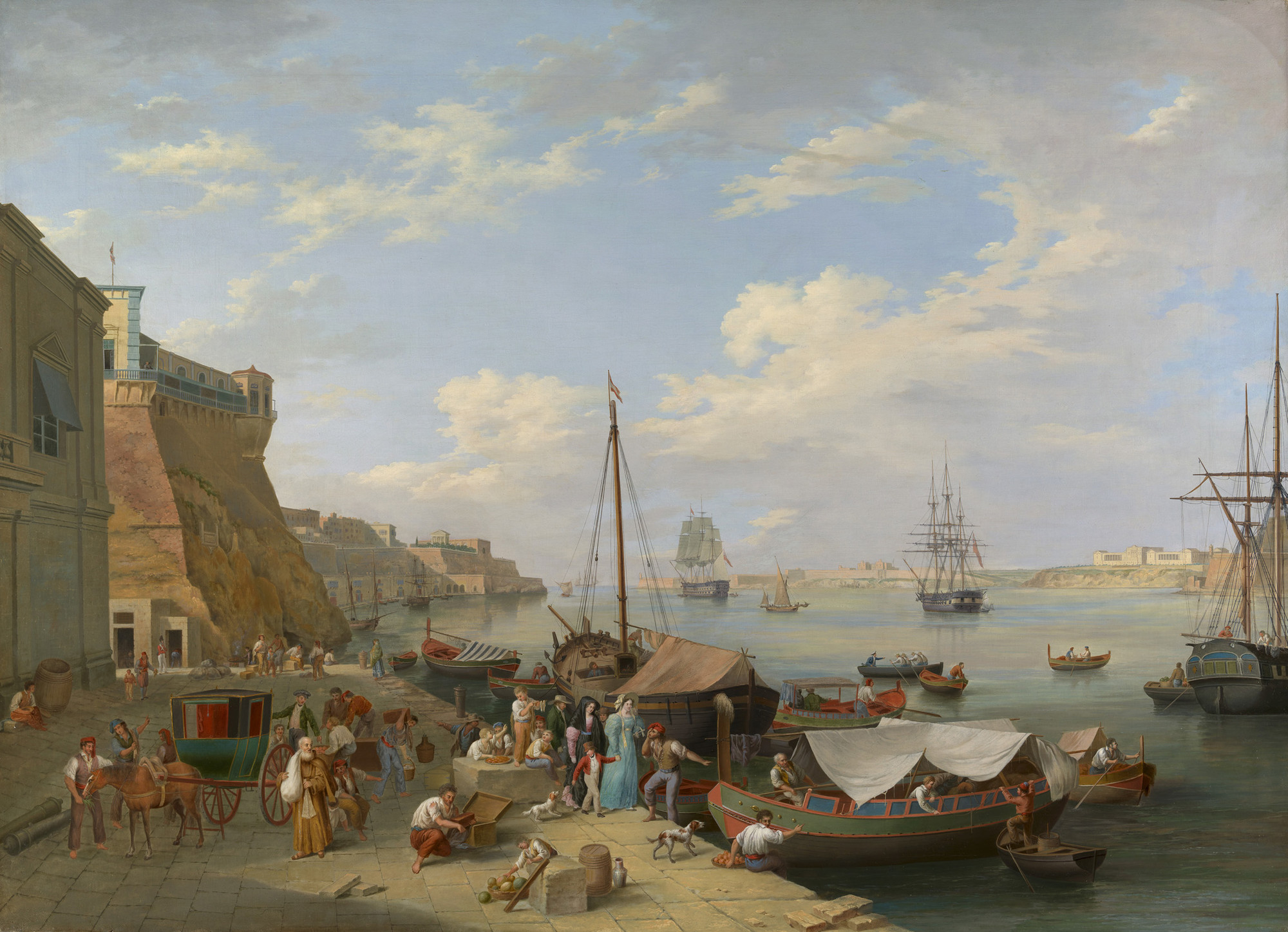
Maltese people in the 19th century

The culture of Malta is a reflection of various cultures that have come into contact with the Maltese Islands throughout the centuries, including neighbouring Mediterranean cultures, and the cultures of the nations that ruled Malta for long periods of time prior to its independence in 1964.

The culture of modern Malta has been described as a "rich pattern of traditions, beliefs and practices," which is the result of "a long process of adaptation, assimilation and cross fertilisation of beliefs and usages drawn from various conflicting sources." It has been subjected to the same complex, historic processes that gave rise to the linguistic and ethnic admixture that defines who the people of Malta and Gozo are today.

=== Language ===
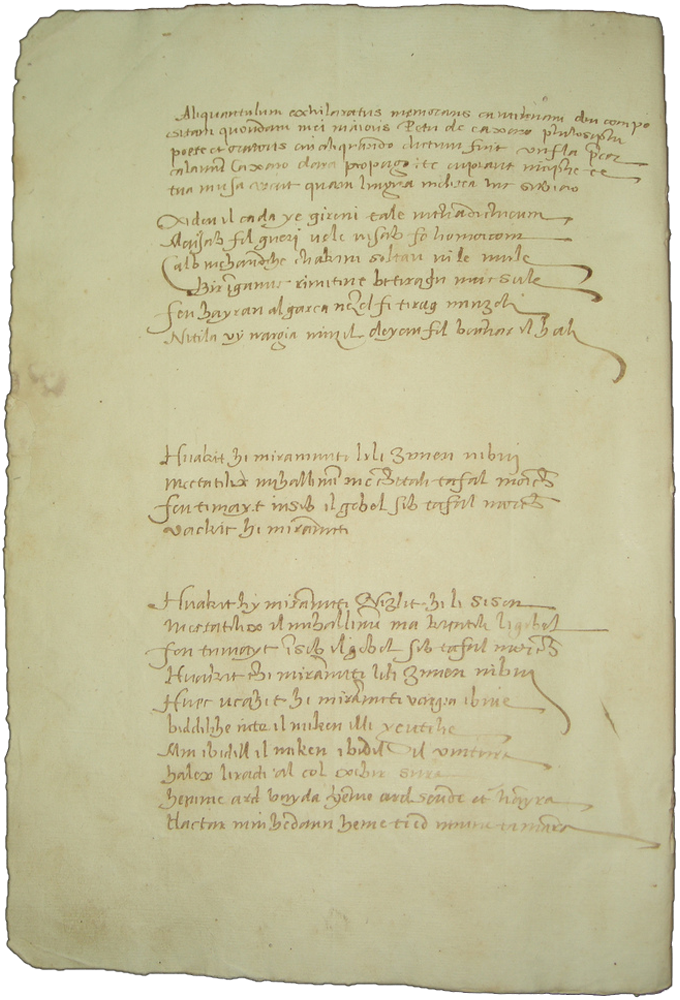
Il-Kantilena by Pietru Caxaro, the oldest text in the Maltese language, 15th century

Maltese people speak the Maltese language, a Semitic language with a substantial Romance (Italian) superstratum and morphology, and written in the Latin alphabet in its standard form. The language is descended from Siculo-Arabic, an extinct dialect of Arabic that was spoken in Sicily by indigenous people who were at that time divided in religion into continuing Greek-rite Christians and Muslims whose recent ancestors were Sicilian converts from Christianity. In the course of Malta's history, the language has adopted massive amounts of vocabulary from Sicilian and Italian, to a much lesser degree, borrowings from English (anglicisms being more common in colloquial Maltese than in the literary language), and a few dozen French loanwords. A large number of superficially Arabic words and idioms are actually loan translations (calques) from Sicilian and Italian which would make little or no sense to speakers of other Arabic-derived languages. On the other hand, the local dialect of English, Maltese English, has considerable Maltese influence.

Maltese became an official language of Malta in 1934, replacing Italian and joining English. There are an estimated 371,900 speakers in Malta of the language, with statistics citing that 100% of the people are able to speak Maltese, 88% English, 66% Italian and 17% French, showing a greater degree of linguistic capabilities than most other European countries. In fact multilingualism is a common phenomenon in Malta, with English, Maltese and on occasion Italian, used in everyday life. Whilst Maltese is the national language, it has been suggested that with the ascendancy of English a language shift may begin; though a survey dating to 2005 suggested that the percentage speaking Maltese as their mother tongue within Malta remained at 97%.

=== Religion ===
The Constitution of Malta provides for freedom of religion but establishes Roman Catholicism as the state religion. In 2021, Maltese were: 82.6% – Roman Catholics (mostly Roman-Rite, with a Byzantine-Rite minority), 5.9% – other Christans, 5.1% – atheists, 3.9% – Muslims, 2.24 – others, 0.26 – unspecified.

== Emigration ==
Malta has long been a country of emigration, with big Maltese communities in English-speaking countries abroad as well as in France.

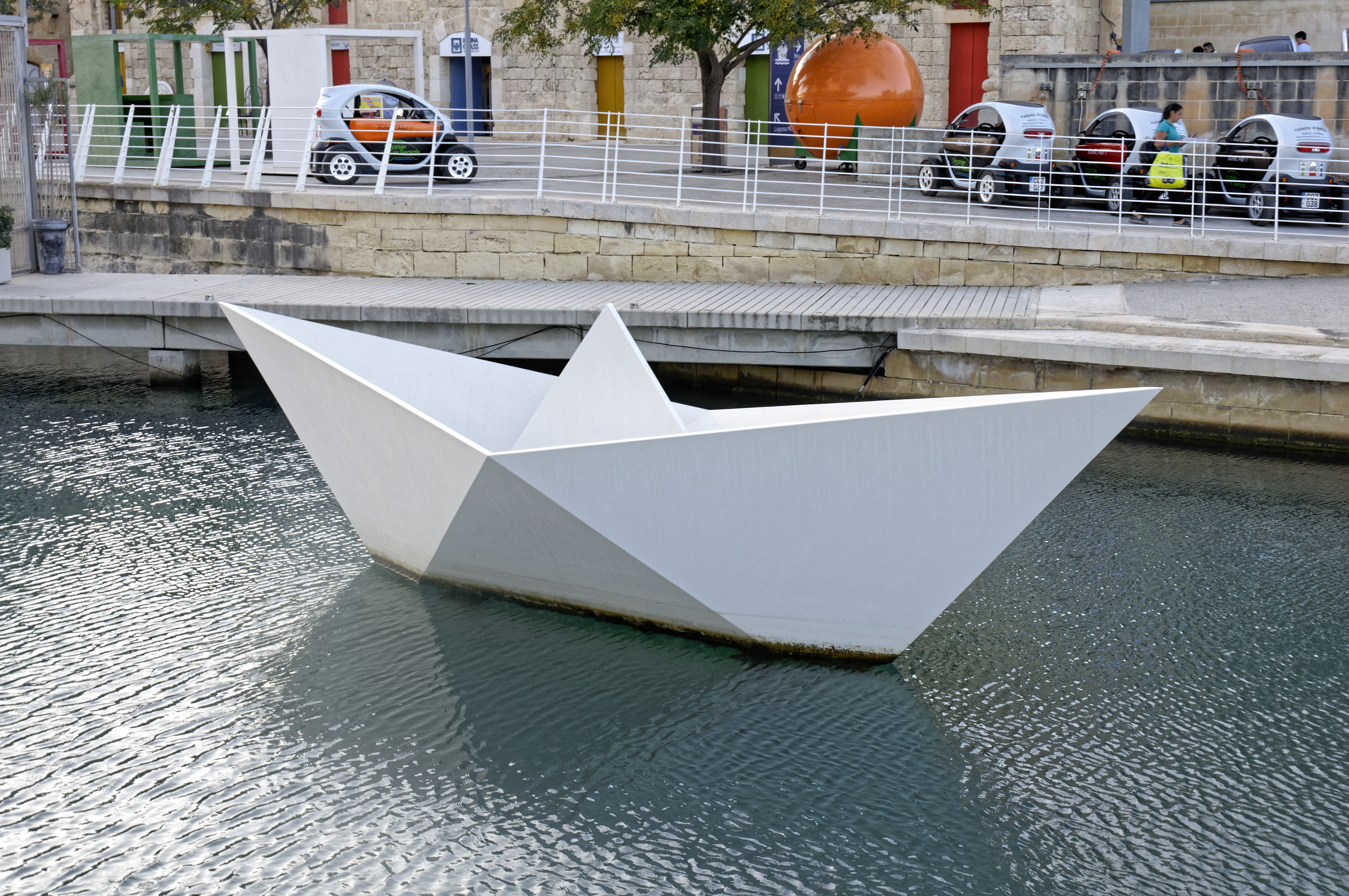
Child Migrants' Memorial at the Valletta Waterfront, commemorating the 310 Maltese child migrants who travelled to Australia between 1950 and 1965.

Mass emigration picked up in the 19th century, reaching its peak in the decades after World War II. Migration was initially to North African countries (particularly Algeria, Tunisia and Egypt); later Maltese migrants headed towards the United Kingdom, the United States, Canada and Australia. There is little trace left of the Franco-Maltese communities in North Africa, most of them having been displaced, after the rise of independence movements, to places like France (especially Marseille and the Riviera), the United Kingdom or Australia. The Franco-Maltese are culturally distinct from the Maltese from Malta, in that the former have remained attached to the use of the Italian language (often, but not always, alongside Maltese) as well as speaking French. Although migration has ceased to be a social phenomenon of significance there are still important Maltese communities in Australia, Canada, the United States and the United Kingdom. Emigration dropped dramatically after the mid-1970s and has since ceased to be a social phenomenon of significance.

Since Malta joined the EU in 2004, expatriate communities emerged in a number of European countries particularly in Belgium and Luxembourg.

== See also ==
- List of Maltese people
- Demographics of Malta
- Maltese Americans
- Corfiot Maltese
