= Orlando E. Caruana =

Maltese-born American soldier

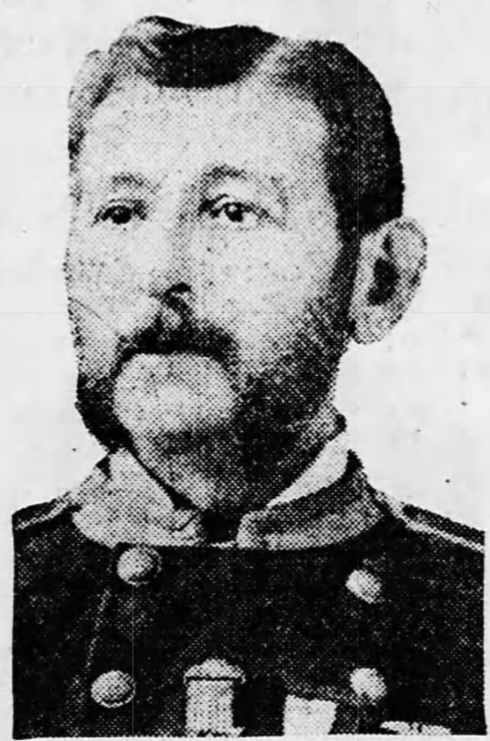
- Caruana in 1917 newspaper
- Born: Orlando Emanuel Caruana; June 23, 1844; Valletta, Crown Colony of Malta
- Died: September 14, 1917 (aged 73); Washington, D.C., U.S.
- Burial place: Mount Olivet Cemetery; Washington, D.C., U.S.
- Military career
- Allegiance: United States
- Branch: United States Army
- Service years: 1861–1864
- Rank: Sergeant
- Unit: (New York (state)) 51st Regiment New York Volunteer Infantry - Company K
- Conflicts: American Civil War; Battle of New Bern; Battle of South Mountain
- Awards: Medal of Honor

Private Orlando Emanuel Caruana (June 23, 1844 – September 14, 1917) was a Maltese-American soldier who fought in the American Civil War. Caruana received the country's highest award for bravery during combat, the Medal of Honor, for his action during the Battle of New Bern in North Carolina on March 14, 1862, and the Battle of South Mountain in Maryland on September 14, 1862. He was honored with the award on November 14, 1890.

== Biography ==
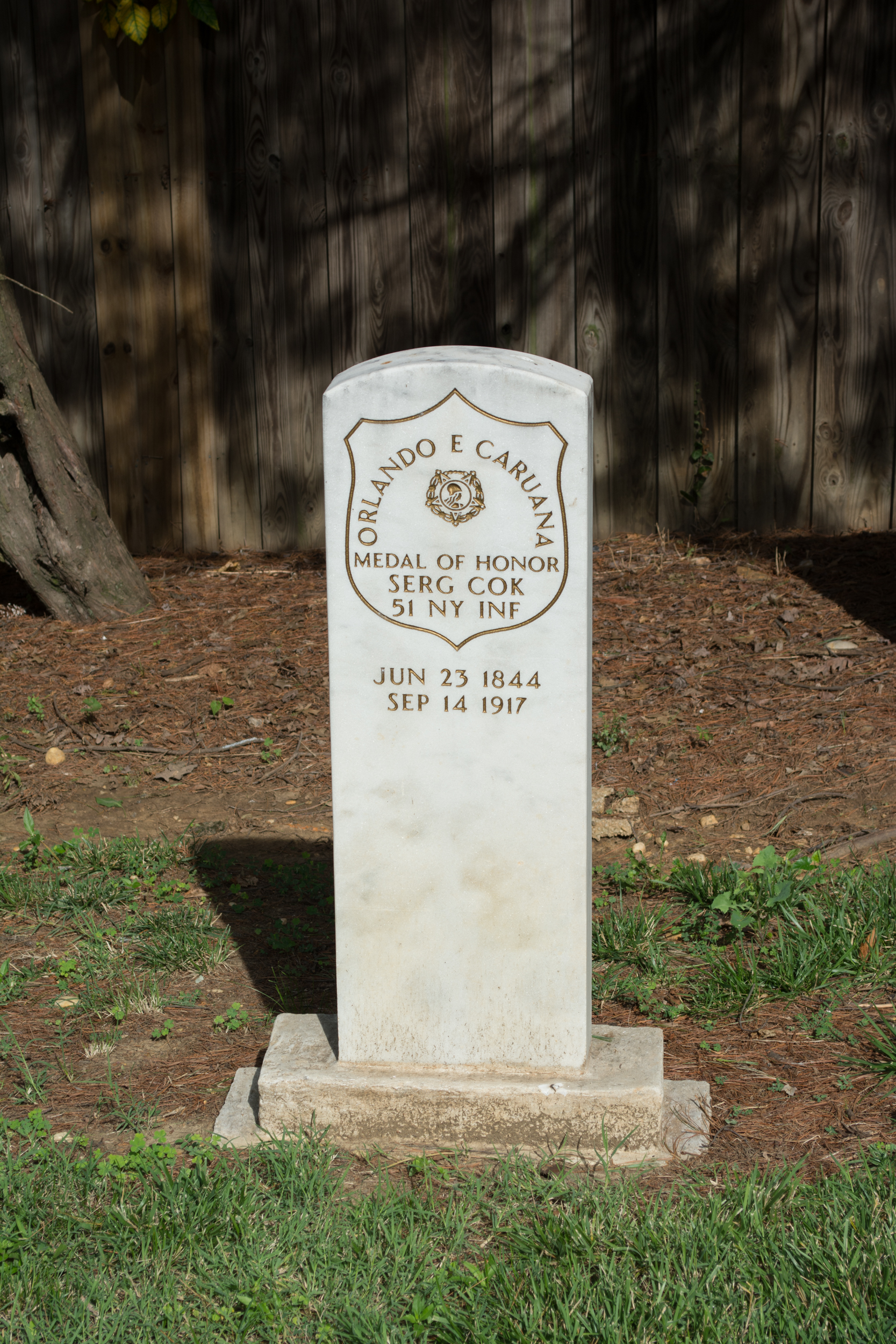
Grave of Orlanda Caruana at Mount Olivet Cemetery in Washington, D.C.

Caruana was born on June 23, 1844, in Valletta in the British Crown Colony of Malta. Claiming to be 20 years old, he enlisted in the U.S. Army from New York City in August 1861. He received the Medal of Honor for two actions. The first was on March 14, 1862, during the Battle of New Bern when he took the battle flag from the wounded color bearer, helping off the battlefield. The second was on September 14 that same year when he, along with three other men, volunteered to scout out the enemy's position in Maryland during the Battle of South Mountain. The other three men were killed but he managed to escape and rejoin his company. He was discharged from the 51st New York Infantry in September 1864.

Caruana died on September 14, 1917, and his remains are interred at the Mount Olivet Cemetery in Washington, D.C.

== Medal of Honor citation ==
At New Bern, North Carolina, brought off the wounded color sergeant and the colors under a heavy fire of the enemy. Was one of four soldiers who volunteered to determine the position of the enemy at South Mountain, Md. While so engaged was fired upon and his three companions killed, but he escaped and rejoined his command in safety.

== See also ==
- List of American Civil War Medal of Honor recipients: A–F
