= Maltese Australians =

Australian citizens who are fully or partially of Maltese descent

Maltese Australians Awstraljani Maltin

Total population
- 198,989 (by ancestry, 2021) (0.78% of the Australian population); 35,413 (by birth, 2021)

Languages
- English · Maltralian · Maltese Italian

Religion
- Roman Catholicism

Related ethnic groups
- Maltese diaspora

Maltese Australians are Australian citizens who are fully or partially of Maltese descent or Malta-born persons who reside in Australia. In the 2021 Census, there were 198,989 people of Maltese descent in Australia and 35,413 Malta-born people residing in the country at the moment of the census.

While most of them emigrated to Australia from Malta, a number emigrated from the United Kingdom where they had settled after having been expelled from Egypt, as holders of British passports, during the Suez Crisis.

== History ==
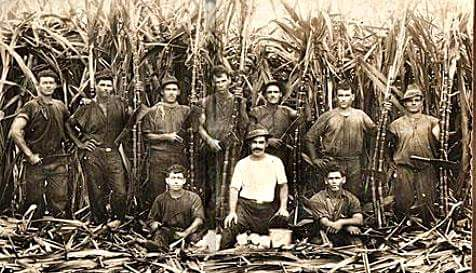
Migrants from Malta and Gozo working in sugar -cane farms in Mackay, Queensland, 1910s

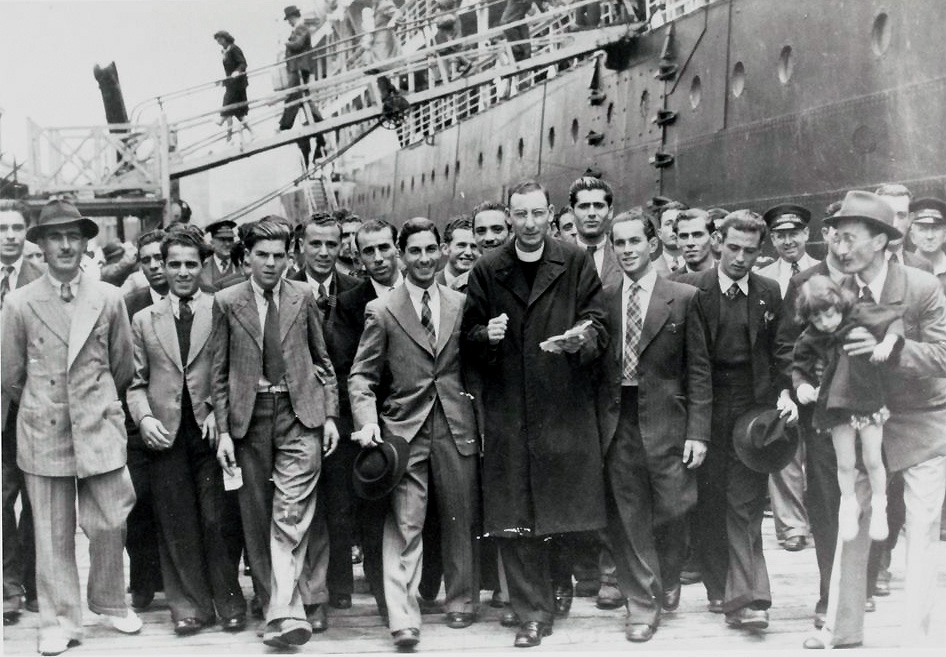
Maltese immigrants land in Sydney from the SS Partizanka, 1940s

The first Maltese to arrive in Australia was possibly transportee John Pace in June 1790, though it is not clear if he was transported from Malta or if he was Maltese at all. The first certain Maltese to arrive in Australia were convicts around 1810. The first Maltese immigrant (as opposed to convict or bonded servant) is thought to have been Antonio Azzopardi who arrived in 1838. Many attempts were made at organised mass migration throughout the 19th century but it was only in 1883 the first group of 70 labourers (and nine stowaways) arrived.

Historically, Maltese immigrants were subject to the White Australia policy. In 1916, a group of 214 Maltese agricultural labourers left for Melbourne aboard a French ship, due to arrive on the date of the conscription referendum. When this became known in Australia, supporters of the "No" vote claimed that the government was importing cheap "coloured labour" to replace Australian workers conscripted for overseas service. The Maltese were called "coloured job jumpers" and the Australian Workers' Union described them as a "black menace". Realising the political danger of allowing the Maltese to land, Prime Minister Billy Hughes – who supported the "Yes" vote – refused them entry under the Immigration Restriction Act 1901, and they were forced to land in Nouméa, New Caledonia. This decision was controversial, as the Maltese were popular among ex-servicemen due to their support for the war effort. After three months, they were allowed to re-enter Australia, but only after being detained upon arrival for another two weeks. The migrants became known in Malta as "it-tfal ta' Billy Hughes" ("the children of Billy Hughes").

Group and mass migration gradually picked up, first, to Queensland and, after World War I, to Sydney whose automobile industry drew many. Immigration was not without difficulty as Maltese workers tended to be looked down upon and restrictions and quotas were applied. A significant percentage of the Maltese immigrants had intended to stay only temporarily for work but many settled in Australia permanently. Maltese immigration to Australia reached its peak during the 1960s.

The majority of Maltese immigrants reside in Melbourne's western suburbs, firstly in the older suburbs of Sunshine and St Albans, before moving to newer neighbouring suburbs such as Caroline Springs, Taylors Lakes and Hillside, the latter having the largest rate of Maltese ancestry in Melbourne. Maltese are numerous as well in Sydney's western suburbs of Greystanes and Horsley Park. The Maltese, as in their home country, are predominantly Roman Catholic.

One of the first women to migrate from Malta to Australia was Carmela Sant in 1915. The move was prompted by her husband Giuseppe Ellul, who had migrated in 1913. Giuseppe Ellul was a stonemason in Mosta before moving to Australia to commence a successful career in sugar cane and dairy farming in Mackay, Queensland. In 1916 the couple gave birth to the first born Maltese Australian, Joseph Ellul.

259 Maltese boys and 51 Maltese girls were sent alone to Catholic institutions in Western and South Australia between 1950 and 1965, following negotiations between the Maltese and Western Australian governments which had started in 1928 when Perth-based Maltese priest Father Raphael Pace urged the Christian Brothers to include Maltese children in its emerging migration scheme. Instead of receiving a better education as their Maltese parents hoped for, many of them were exploited for building works, and were never scholarised in English, while also forgetting their own Maltese language. Similar to other children living with the Christian Brother, the children were abused and measures were taken to not allow or limit contact with their family members in Malta.

== Notable people ==
- Adam Agius: Singer, guitarist and founding member of the heavy metal band Alchemist.
- Jason Agius: Actor. Also of Italian descent.
- Daniel Amalm. Actor and musician. Also of Swedish descent.
- Brendan Aquilina: Lawn bowler.
- John Aquilina: Politician.
- Thomas Aquilina: Association footballer.
- Jayden Attard: Australian rules footballer.
- Monica Attard: Journalist and former host of Media Watch.
- Jayne Azzopardi: Journalist and television personality.
- Steve Balbi: Musician.
- Shaun Bonétt: Entrepreneur.
- Luke Branighan: Rugby League player.
- Nicky Bomba: Musician.
- Tony Briffa: Politician and first known intersex mayor and public officeholder in the world.
- Jake Brimmer: Association footballer.
- Tony Buhagiar: Australian rules footballer.
- Trent Buhagiar: Association footballer.
- John Buttigieg: Rugby League player. Also of Aboriginal descent.
- Mark Buttigieg: Politician.
- Jaryd Cachia: Australian rules footballer.
- Ashley Callus: Swimmer
- Joe Camilleri: Musician.
- Joseph Camilleri: Social scientist and philosopher.
- Leslie Camilleri: Criminal involved in the 1997 Bega schoolgirl murders.
- Terry Camilleri: Actor.
- Paul Capsis: Singer, actor and cabaret performer. Also of Greek descent.
- Troy Cassar-Daley: Country singer-songwriter. Also of Aboriginal descent.
- Tyler Cassel: Rugby League player. Also of Scottish descent.
- Josh Cavallo: Association footballer and first openly gay player in the A-League. Also of Italian descent.
- Nicholas D'Agostino: Association footballer. Also of Italian descent.
- Robyn Denholm (née Sammut: Tesla chairman. Also of Italian and Scottish descent.
- Lou Drofenik: Novelist and academic.
- Laura Dundovic: Model. Also of Croatian descent.
- Alby Falzon: Filmmaker, photographer and publisher.
- Dan Falzon: Actor.
- Joey Falzon: Association footballer.
- Michael Falzon: Musical theatre/rock tenor, actor and producer
- Amanda Farrugia: Australian rules footballer.
- Amelia Farrugia: Soprano opera singer.
- Jeff Fenech: Boxer.
- Mario Fenech: Rugby League player.
- Paul Fenech: Actor.
- Darren Gauci: Horse Jockey.
- Natalie Gauci: Singer and 2007 Australian Idol winner. Also of Italian descent.
- Ryan Gambin: Swimmer.
- Matt Gafa: Rugby League player.
- Ben Galea: Rugby League player.
- Danny Galea: Rugby League player.
- James Galea: Magician and actor.
- Rob Galea: Roman Catholic priest and contemporary Christian singer-songwriter.
- Godwin Grech: Politician.
- Blake Grima: Australian rules footballer.
- Hollie Grima: Basketballer.
- Nathan Grima: Australian rules footballer.
- Andrew Heffernan: Rugby League player.
- Jenny Hill: Mayor of Townsville, Queensland
- Adam Hills: Television personality. Also of Austrian descent.
- John Hutchinson: Association footballer.
- Jed Kurzel: Singer-songwriter-guitarist and film composer. Also of Polish descent.
- Justin Kurzel: Singer-songwriter-guitarist and film composer. Also of Polish descent.
- Jamie Maclaren: Association footballer. Also of Scottish descent.
- Alex Malley: Former chief executive of CPA Australia. Also of Greek descent.
- Mark Mallia: Outsider artist.
- Mitchell Mallia: Association footballer.
- Jake Mamo: Rugby League player.
- Sean McMahon: Rugby Union player.
- Paul Mellor: Rugby League player.
- Shaun Micallef: Television personality.
- Steve Mifsud: Snooker player.
- Kevin Moore: Sprinter. Also of Cypriot descent.
- Kevin Muscat: Association footballer.
- Manny Muscat: Association footballer.
- Steven Pace: Association footballer.
- Shaun Parnis: Lawn bowler.
- Reno Piscopo: Association footballer. Also of Italian descent.
- Diana Prazak: Boxer. Also of Croatian descent.
- Geoff Robinson: Rugby League player. Also of English descent.
- Jarrod Sammut: Rugby League player. Also of Aboriginal descent.
- Madeleine Scerri: Swimmer.
- Joe Spiteri: Association footballer.
- Tash Sultana: Singer-songwriter.
- Shane Shackleton: Rugby League player.
- Jason Singh: Singer for the Melbourne band Taxiride. Also of Indo-Fijian descent.
- Sam Sparro: Singer, songwriter and record producer. Also of Portuguese descent.
- Sam Stone: Rugby League player.
- James Tedesco: Rugby League player. Also of Italian descent.
- Melissa Tkautz: Actress. Also of Austrian descent.
- Kym Valentine: Actress.
- Adam Vella: Sport shooter.
- Alex Vella: Businessman, former boxer and the former National President of the Rebels Motorcycle Club.
- Michael Vella: Rugby League player.
- Candice Warner: Ironwoman, television personality and wife of Australian cricketer David Warner.
- Samara Weaving: Actress and model. Also of English descent.
- Bronson Xerri: Rugby League player.
- Tristan Xerri: Australian rules footballer.
- Anthony Xuereb: Rugby League player.
- Adrian Zahra: Association footballer.
- Christian Zahra: Politician.
- Paul Zammit: Politician. Also of Greek descent.
- John Zarb: Conscientious objector to military conscription during the Vietnam War.
- Michael Zerafa: Boxer.

== See also ==
- Australia–Malta relations
- European Australians
- Europeans in Oceania
- Immigration to Australia
- Maltese New Zealanders
- Maltese people
- Maltralian – Dialect of Maltese in Australia
- Maltese Americans

== Bibliography ==
- Maurice N. Cauchi, Maltese Migrants in Australia, Malta 1990
- Barry York, Maltese 'prohibited immigrants': the Australian experience, 1912–1946
- Barry York, The Maltese of Woolloomooloo Wharf
- Documents relating to Early Maltese Migration to Australia – Department of Immigration, Western Australian Branch, General Correspondence File, Maltese Immigrants and Stowaways [8 pages, 1927–34]
- Barry York, Maltese Identity in Australia – What Future?, speech for the National Conference of Maltese Community Councils of Australia in 1993
- Sandra Kipp, Maltese language maintenance in Australia (based on the 1996 Census), from: Maltese Background Youth – Editors Cauchi M, Borland H, Adams R, 1999, [Europe Australia Institute], p 9
- Maurice Cauchi, Education and Maltese language usage among persons of Maltese background, from: Maltese Background Youth – Editors Cauchi M, Borland H, Adams R, 1999, [Europe Australia Institute], p 1
