= Maltese Italian =

Italian language spoken in Malta

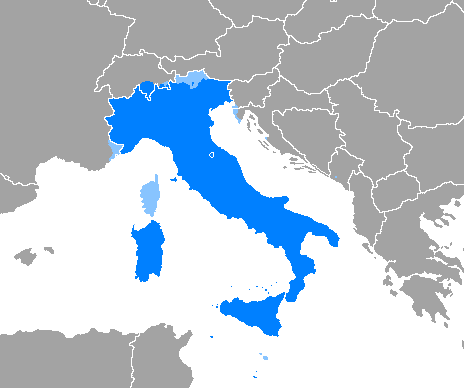
Geographical distribution of the Italian language in Europe: Areas where it is the majority language Areas where it is a minority language or where it was the majority in the past

Maltese Italian is the Italian language spoken in Malta.

== History ==
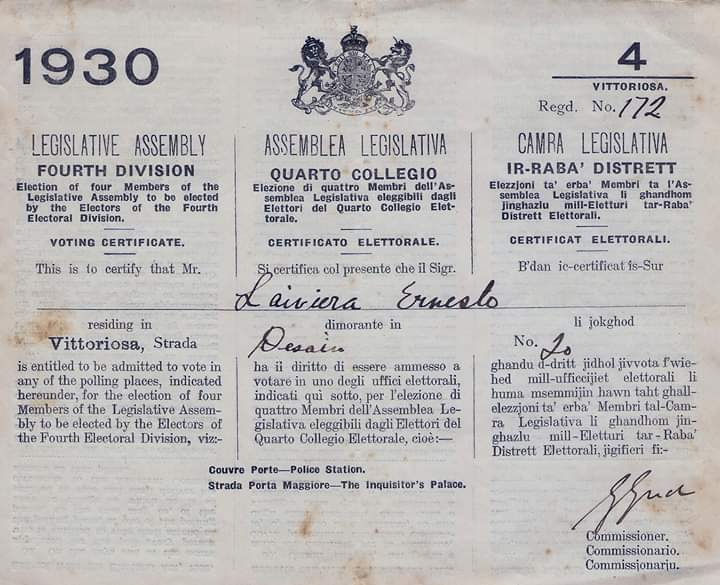
Tri-lingual voting document for the later cancelled 1930 elections in Malta

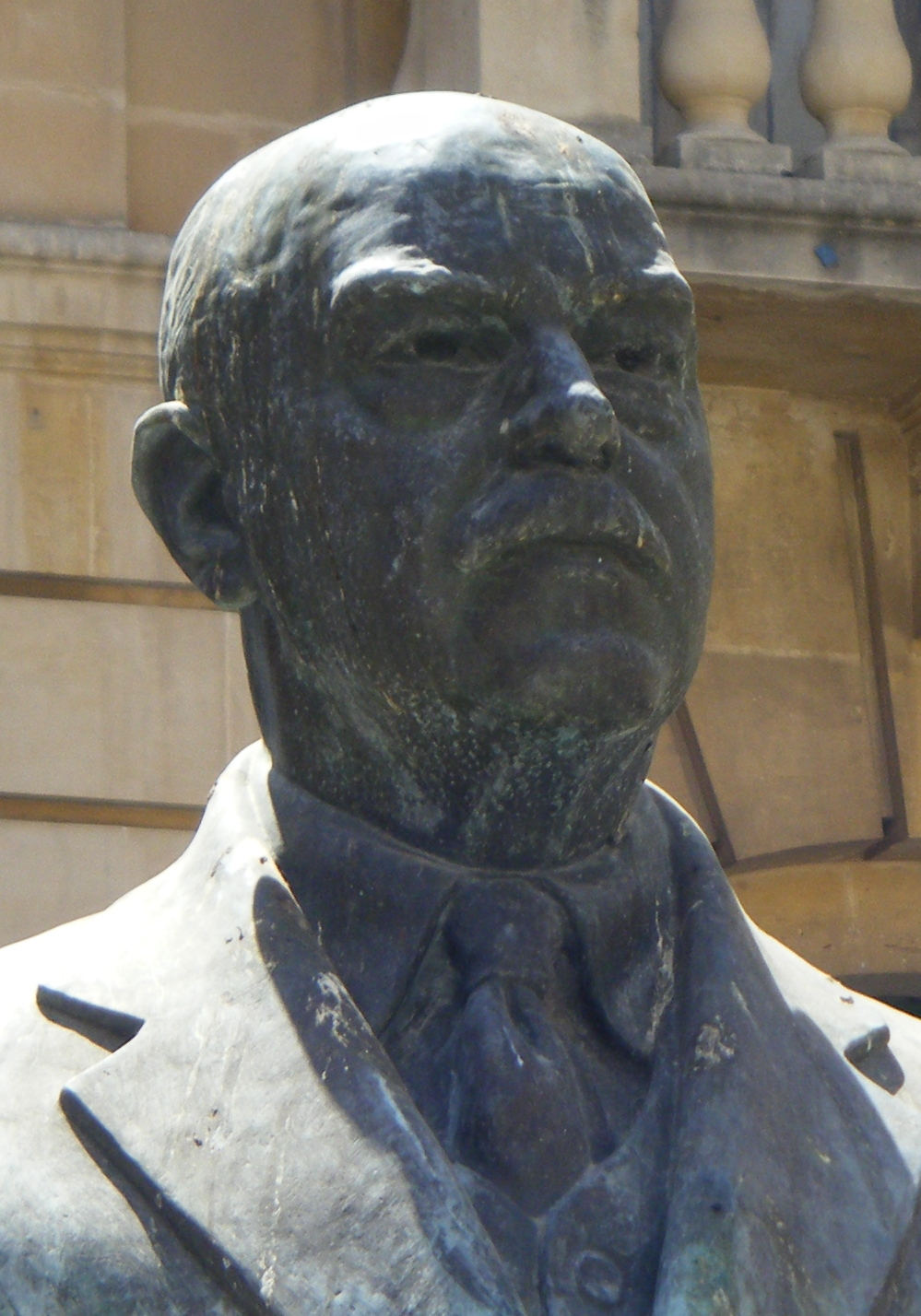
Enrico Mizzi (Prime Minister of Malta in 1950) was jailed in 1940 also for his pro-Italian language opinions

For many centuries since the Middle Ages and until 1934, Italian was the official language of Malta. Indeed, it had been considered the language of culture in Malta since the Italian Renaissance.

In the 19th century, Italian irredentists and Italian Maltese wanted to promote its use throughout Malta for plans to re-unify it with Italy as Malta was part of the Kingdom of Sicily up to the 13th century. In the first decades of the 20th century there was even a struggle within Maltese society and politics over the "language problem", which came to a head before World War II.

Although only the rich could speak Italian, it was however understood by nearly all the population, and with Maltese being generally spoken by those less well-off, Italian was used as the official language in Malta until 1934.

But in 1933, the Constitution was withdrawn over the Government's budgetary vote for the teaching of Italian in elementary schools. and furthermore Italian was dropped by the British authorities from official language status in Malta in 1934, its place being taken by Maltese.

In 1935, there were protests against all these decisions, promoted by the Maltese nationalists: the Nationalist Party of Enrico Mizzi declared that most of the Maltese population was supporting directly or indirectly the Italian Maltese's struggle.

The greatest Italian-speaking Maltese of the second half of the 20th century is Vincenzo Maria Pellegrini (1911–1997), who wrote most of his works in Italian and composed a poem in Maltese Italian in honour of Garibaldi in 1982, a hundred years after the death of the "hero of the two worlds".

Throughout the late 20th century and early 21st century, there has been a huge increase in Maltese people who are able to speak or understand (or both) the Italian language, thanks mainly to broadcasts of Italian television: from 15% (nearly 40,000) in 1950 to 36% (145,000) in 2002 and to 86% (360,000) in 2010. However, there has been a sharp decrease in the use of Italian amongst the younger generation, due to the prevalence of English speaking media through the television and internet as well as Italian no longer being chosen for study by a majority of students.

In 1981, the government of Malta began to publish the monthly magazine Lo Stivale in Italian as an aide to teachers and students who choose to learn the language in secondary school.

== See also ==
- Italian language in Croatia

== Bibliography ==
- Brincat, Giuseppe. Malta. Una storia linguistica. Ed. Le Mani. Recco, 2004
- Brincat, J. La lingua italiana a Malta: storia, scuola e società. Istituto italiano di cultura. Valletta, 1992
- Caruana, S. The Italian Job: the impact of input from television on language learning (in J. Borg, M. A. Lauri, & A. Hillman (eds.), Exploring the Maltese Media Landscape). Allied Newspapers Ltd. Valletta, 2009
- Fabei, Stefano. Carmelo Borg Pisani (1915–1942) – eroe o traditore?. Lo Scarabeo Ed. Bologna, 2006
- Hull, Geoffrey. The Malta Language Question: A Case Study in Cultural Imperialism. Said International, Valletta, 1993.
