= List of diasporas =

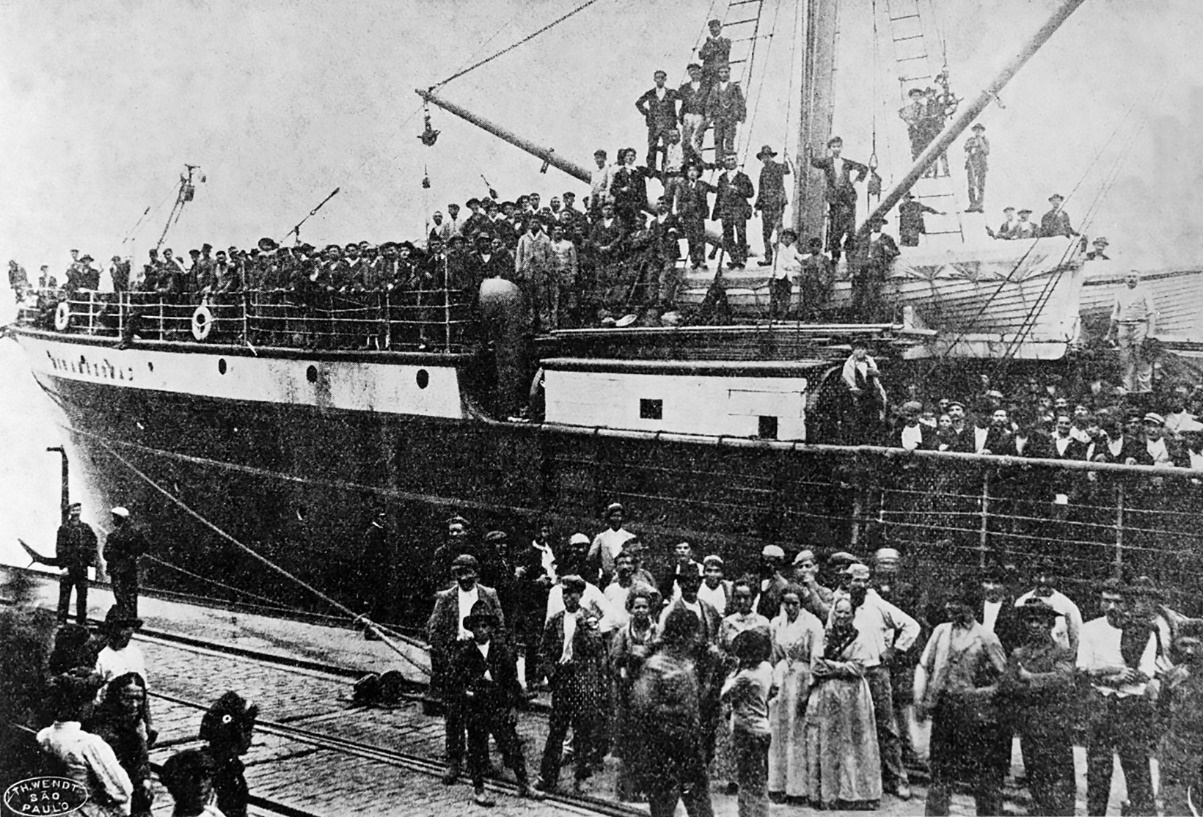
Ship loaded with Italian emigrants arrived in Brazil (1907).

History provides many examples of notable diasporas. The Eurominority.eu map (the European Union) Peoples of the World includes some diasporas and underrepresented/stateless ethnic groups.

Note: the list below is not definitive and includes groups that have not been given significant historical attention. Whether the migration of some of the groups listed fulfils the conditions required to be considered a diaspora may be open for debate.

== A ==
- Acadian diaspora – In 1755, during the French and Indian War, the French-speaking population of Acadia was expelled by the British colonial government, in an event that has come to be known as the Great Upheaval or Grand Dérangement: Expulsion of the Acadians. Although an order in council was passed in 1764 to allow the Acadians to return, many settled in other parts of North America, including a large population in Louisiana, where they became known as the Cajuns.
- Afghan refugees – fled their country throughout the 20th century, especially to nearby Pakistan, India and Iran. Since 1980, over half a million Afghans migrated to Europe (many to Great Britain and Germany), while a quarter of a million went to North America (the US and Canada), and less than 50,000 settled in Australia. There are around 25,000 people of Afghan descent living in Hamburg alone. As with the Durand Line issue, some deny Afghan as being considered an ethnicity and consider only Pashtuns from Pakistan and Afghanistan to be Afghans as opposed to non-Pashtuns in Afghanistan. In the old definition of Afghan, it refers to just Pashtun people, and can especially imply Muslim communities in the Indian subcontinent, (and those that migrated into the Caribbean region) most of which have forgot Pashto and replaced with the language of their host region. These assimilated communities were endogamous at the time keeping the members ancestrally homogenous, however the partition of India caused miscegenation to be high in many of such communities. Patrilineal descent is the typical indication of such ancestry.
  Map of the Afghan Diaspora in the World
- African diaspora – Black African diasporas. This includes Afro-Caribbeans, Afro-Europeans (e.g. Black British), Afro-Latin Americans and Black Canadians.

Map of the African Diaspora in the World

Map of the Malian Diaspora in the World

Map of the Mauritanians Diaspora in the World

  - African Americans: The 2010 US Census stated 43 million overall, but between 35 and 50 million or 12-15% of the US population are Black or of Sub-Saharan African descent. They tend to be descendants of slaves brought to the New World in the 1600s-early 19th century until the practice was made illegal in 1865 after the US Civil War (the United States or Union defeated the seceded Confederacy in the southern states). Significant immigration of African-descended populations from the Caribbean, plus direct immigration from Sub-Saharan Africa, began in the 20th century.
  - African Australians – part of the African diaspora in Australia. Note that in Australia, the term "African Australian" refers strictly to people who migrated directly from Africa to Australia, or had an ancestor do so. Immigrants from the African diaspora (such as Caribbeans and African Americans) are not included in the term.
- Agudas - Formerly enslaved Afro-Brazilians who migrated to West Africa (modern Nigeria, Togo and Benin) in the 19th century, both due to deportations after the Malê revolt and to voluntary migration for cultural or economic reasons. They are known as the Tabom people in Ghana.
- Albanian diaspora – 2.8 million live in Albania, with an estimated 8.5 million world total (the largest populations being in Italy, Greece, Turkey, the United States, Canada and Australia). The largest concentration of Albanians outside the country is in neighbouring Kosovo. Other Albanian enclaves are in southern Serbia, North Macedonia, Montenegro, Romania, Russia, Turkey, Ukraine, Bosnia and Herzegovina, and coastal Croatia. Another population of ethnic Albanians, known as the Arbereshe, has lived in southern Italy, especially in regions of Abruzzo, Calabria, Campania, Naples, Apulia and Sicily for over eight centuries. In the 19th and 20th centuries, repeated large waves of Albanian emigration took place as Albanians moved to northern and western Europe (i.e. France, Germany, Hungary, the Netherlands, Norway, Spain, Sweden and the United Kingdom.), the former Soviet Union, North America (the U.S. – see Albanian American and with smaller numbers in Mexico and South America), Australia and across Asia (the former Ottoman Empire in the Middle East).

Map of the Albanian Diaspora in the World

- Americans living abroad – People from the United States (US), largest numbers in Mexico and Canada, as well in Liberia (African-Americans), Israel (American Jews), Japan (off the Asian continent), and throughout Asia (South Korea and Philippines), Europe (i.e. France and the UK) and the (Latin) Americas.

Map of the American Diaspora in the World

- Arab diaspora – around 30 million Arabs have left the Arab world escaping hotspots, and conflicts areas, those who have migrated from the Arab world, now reside in Western Europe, the Americas (e.g. Detroit has the largest Arab-American community), Australia and elsewhere. (See especially Lebanese, Syrians and Palestinians).

Map of the Arab Diaspora in the World

Map of the Saudi Diaspora in the World

- Argentine diaspora – People from Argentina known as Argentines whom live overseas in communities across the Americas (like Uruguay and Brazil until the 1990s), western Europe (esp. Spain, Italy, Germany, France and the United Kingdom.) and elsewhere (i.e. Israel), mainly are political refugees from the military junta in the late 1970s and 1980s, (see also Argentine Americans in the USA.).

Map of the Argentinian Diaspora in the World

- Armenian diaspora – Armenians living in their ancient homeland, which had been controlled by the Ottoman Empire for centuries, fled persecution, massacres and genocide during several periods of forced emigration, from the 1880s to the 1920s. Many Armenians settled in the United States, a majority of whom live in the state of California (see Armenian Americans), France, Canada, Greece, Cyprus, Iran, Lebanon, Russia, Syria, and a small orphan population in the former Ethiopian Empire.

Map of the Armenian Diaspora in the World

- Asian Americans – made up of mainly East Asian peoples in the United States, esp. of other diasporas like Chinese (the largest), Japanese and Filipino, the largest concentrations are in California like the city of San Francisco (35%, while 20% of the city are Chinese+4% Taiwanese) and Los Angeles; the state of Hawaii – over half (60%) of state population, and New York City.
- Assyrian diaspora – a Semitic Christian population of the Middle East (originally they lived in Assyria). In the 20th century, millions of Assyrians left the Middle East due to ongoing ethnic, political and religious persecution. Assyrian communities flourish in the United States, Canada, Australia and throughout Western Europe.
- Australian diaspora – About 750,000 Australian expatriates live outside of Australia, mostly business executives and retired people seeking a new place to live. There are large Australian communities in New Zealand, the United Kingdom, and North America; and smaller groups in Europe, Africa (especially South Africa), the Middle East (particularly the United Arab Emirates), east and south Asia (including Thailand and Papua New Guinea), and Latin America (like Costa Rica, esp. Brazil, Chile, and Argentina).

Map of the Australian Diaspora in the World

- Azerbaijani diaspora – About 35 million people, the communities of Azerbaijanis living outside of places of their ethnic origin: Azerbaijan Republic and Iranian Azerbaijan. The term Azerbaijani diaspora refers to the global community of ethnic Azeris.
  Map of the Azerbaijani Diaspora in the World

== B ==
- Bangladeshi diaspora – members of the Bangladeshi diaspora may have moved abroad for better living conditions, to give western education to their children, to escape poverty, to support their financial condition or to send money back to families in Bangladesh. The countries and regions with the largest Bangladeshi populations include the Middle East (notably Saudi Arabia and the United Arab Emirates), Malaysia and parts of the western world, including the United Kingdom and Italy.
  Map of the Bangladeshi Diaspora in the World
- Basque diaspora – Basques who left the Basque Country in northern Spain and southwest France, usually to the Americas (esp. the western U.S., Chile – where 10-20% of the population are of Basque descent, Uruguay, Colombia, Venezuela and Mexico) for economic or political reasons. There are also Basque Catholic missionaries across the world, as well Basque fishermen in Canada (Newfoundland), Northern Europe, East Asia, and Oceania (Australia).

Map of the Basque Diaspora in the World

- Bengali Hindu diaspora – the worldwide population of the Bengali Hindus of Indian and Bangladeshi origin.
- Bihari – Pakistani Muslims of different ethnic origins in Bengal, India and Bangladesh, a small percentage of population left over from Pakistan's rule of Bangladesh (then East Pakistan) from 1947 to 1971.
- Bosnian diaspora – grew substantially during the Bosnian war. It mainly consists of Bosniaks but also out of Bosnian Croats and Bosnian Serbs. Many Bosnians live in the United States, mostly in large cities like St. Louis, Missouri; Chicago; New York City; Washington, D.C., Boston, Massachusetts; and Los Angeles; and many live in Australia, Canada, Denmark, Germany, Sweden, Norway, Italy, Austria, Croatia, Serbia, Switzerland and Turkey.

Map of the Bosnian Diaspora in the World

- Brazilian diaspora – Motivated by factors such as the elevated levels of corruption, violence, unemployment, poverty, income inequality, taxation, among other reasons. Has been characterized by two large waves. The first wave started during the 1980s, a period known in Latin America as The Lost Decade (in Brazil, more precisely after the end of the military dictatorship in 1985, when the direct democracy was reinstated with the beginning of the New Republic). During this period, despite several attempts made by the then-Presidents to stabilize the economy, the country suffered a series of successive economic crises that lasted until the early 2000s, culminating in issues like hyperinflation, samba effect, privatization of the water system, among other consequences. Because of this, many Brazilians decided to move abroad looking for a better life. The second one was larger and started during the 2014 economic crisis, when a record number of Brazilians started to leave the country. This emigration continued to escalate in later years until the arrival of the COVID-19 pandemic in the country in February 2020. Throughout history, it is estimated that about 3.1 million Brazilians have moved to other countries, mainly the United States, Paraguay, Japan and Portugal. In the United States, many Brazilians try to accomplish what is known as The American Dream. They generally live in communities where there are a large number of countrymen. They are most found in the states of Florida, Massachusetts, New York, New Jersey and California. In Paraguay, where the Brazilian immigrants are known as Brasiguayos, most of them work either in agricultural lands located in rural areas or selling products for Brazilians in several retail stores opened by them in Ciudad del Este, a city located near the Triple Frontier with Brazil and Argentina. In Japan, most immigrants are Japanese Brazilians who are direct descendants of the Japanese immigrants who moved to Brazil, especially to the community they formed during the early 20th century in the district of Liberdade, located in the city of São Paulo. In Portugal, many Brazilians are attracted by the ease to speak Portuguese (the European Portuguese dialect does not have large differences compared to Brazilian Portuguese), and considering the large number of Brazilians who have Portuguese ancestry, many of them have decided to apply for the acquisition of the Portuguese citizenship using the principle of jus sanguinis.

Map of the Brazilian Diaspora in the World

- Breton diaspora - The population from Brittany, Celtic region in north-western France who have emigrated temporarily or permanently outside the borders of this region, while maintaining links with it. Bretons chiefly migrated to France, Canada, the United States and Caribbean islands but also in the United Kingdom, Australia and New Zealand among others.
- British diaspora – During the last four hundred years millions of English, Scots, and Welsh have migrated all over the world, for a great variety of reasons, especially to the United States, Canada, Australia, New Zealand, and South Africa, but many other places besides (e.g. Zimbabwe, Spain, Kenya, Chile and Argentina).

Map of the British Diaspora in the World

- Bulgarian diaspora – an estimated three million ethnic Bulgarians are dispersed around the world, the majority in Europe such as in neighboring nations of Romania, Greece, Serbia, Turkey and North Macedonia. About 200,000 in the US, with 50,000 others in Canada, 20,000 in Australia, and 20,000 in Brazil. Other large Bulgarian diaspora communities are in France, Germany, Spain, Argentina, Italy, Russia and the United Kingdom.
  Map of the Bulgarian Diaspora in the World

== C ==
- The Cape Verdean diaspora refers to historical emigration from Cape Verde. Today, more Cape Verdeans live abroad than in Cape Verde itself. Diaspora communities include those in the United States, Portugal, the Netherlands, France, Italy, Spain and Canada.
- The Cham who are Southeast Asians mostly practice Islam. The Cham people's diaspora begins with the conclusion of the Cham-Vietnamese War of 1471 as Vietnamese forces attacked and sacked the capital Vijaya and defeated the Cham army decisively. As a result of the conflict, the Champa kingdom was forced to cede its remaining territory to Vietnam. Sizable communities of descendants exist in Cambodia's eastern territories, such as Kampong Cham province, on Hainan Island in China and the Vietnamese archipelago of the South China Sea. The Cham people's numbers were reduced by the persecutions of Pol Pot's Khmer Rouge regime in the 1970s.
- Chechens – fled Chechnya during the 1990s insurrection against Russia. The majority of displaced Chechens fled to Azerbaijan, Armenia and the Republic of Georgia, but tens of thousands of Chechen refugees migrated to Europe, North America and across the Middle East. Previous waves of migration took Chechens to Egypt, Iran, Iraq, Jordan, Turkey and Saudi Arabia in 1820 or 1890.
- Cherokees – a Native American tribe indigenous to the Southeastern United States, whose official tribal organization is Cherokee Nation based in Oklahoma, United States, which had 400,000 citizens in 2022 to increased to nearing 500,000. The 2020 US census reported 800,000 Americans claimed Cherokee descent, but another source said 1 million as of 2025 (the largest numbers are 400,000 in Oklahoma and 300,000 in California) including the United Keetoowah Band of Cherokee Indians has 18,000 members in Oklahoma and Arkansas, and the Eastern Band of Cherokee Indians has 18,000 members in their remnants of their homeland in North Carolina and Tennessee. The beginnings of the Cherokee diaspora was from their forced removal in the Trail of Tears. Later, thousands of "Americanized" Cherokee farmers were forced to settle across the Americas (i.e. Canada, Cuba and South America-an estimated 90–100,000 descendants there) as the result of the Dawes Act. In the 20th century, many Cherokees served in the U.S. Army during World War I, World War II, the Korean War and the Vietnam War. These soldiers left some descendants by intermarriage with "war brides" in Europe and east Asia. Some Cherokees and other American Indians might have emigrated to Europe and elsewhere through the British and Spanish empires. They make up the global Cherokee diaspora.
- The Chian diaspora occurred in 1822, when the Greco-Genoese population of Chios was killed, exiled, and enslaved by their Ottoman rulers.
- Chilean diaspora – A small but widespread community, mostly of political refugees who fled the Augusto Pinochet regime after the 1973 coup. Overseas Chilean communities are in Argentina, Australia, Brazil, Canada, France, Great Britain, Italy, Spain, Sweden, Venezuela and the USA. (see Chilean Americans), but smaller communities are found in Belgium, Japan, Norway, New Zealand, and the Netherlands. During the Pinochet era, many refugees moved to East Germany when it was a communist country before reunification with Germany in 1990.

Map of the Chilean Diaspora in the World

- Chinese diaspora – number over 50 million worldwide with other estimates range up to 100 million total of Chinese descent. The largest overseas Chinese communities are in Asia. Indonesia, Thailand, Malaysia, Singapore, Philippines, Vietnam and Myanmar (in descending order of ethnic Chinese population size) have at least 1 million ethnic Chinese each. Three countries outside Asia, namely the United States (esp. States of California, Hawaii, New York and Washington State), Canada (esp. urban areas of Toronto, Montreal, Vancouver) and Australia (esp. cities of Sydney, Melbourne) have populations over 1 million in size. Other sizable communities may be found in Japan, Cambodia, Brazil, Peru, Venezuela, Russia, France, the United Kingdom, the Republic of Ireland, New Zealand and South Africa, each with over 100,000 ethnic Chinese.

Map of the Chinese Diaspora in the World

Map of the Taiwanese Diaspora in the World

  - Hakka people.
  - Hui – Muslims in China.
- Circassians – fled Circassia mainly in the 1860s. 90% of Circassians were forced by Russian Colonialists to exile in the Ottoman Empire or Imperial Turkey. The Circassian Diaspora is over four million worldwide, with large Circassian communities in Bulgaria, Cyprus, Egypt, Israel, Jordan, Kosovo, Lebanon, Romania, Serbia, Syria as well the former USSR, over 100,000 Circassians in North America (the United States and Canada), and over 10,000 Circassians in Australia. There are documented stories on Circassian beauties about thousands of renowned "beautiful" women from Circassia in the mid 19th century emigrated to the western world where they married European and North American men.
- Colombian diaspora – Approximately 7.6 million Colombians have left Colombia across the country's history, either because of displacement during the armed conflict, the pursuit of educational or vocational attainment, economic hardship, professional and social mobility, entrepreneurship reasons and even for avoiding political prosecution. The Colombian diaspora lives across the Americas (i.e. Canada, and South American nations), and across Europe (i.e. Spain, France, Italy, Germany and the United Kingdom). The largest overseas Colombian populations are those of Venezuela followed by the United States where they number over 2 million Colombian Americans, one of the largest Latino nationalities in the country.

Map of the Colombian Diaspora in the World

- Congolese diaspora found across the continent of Africa, their home countries divided by the Kongo River are the Republic of Congo to the north and the Democratic Republic of Congo formerly Zaire to the south. Smaller Congolese communities developed in South Africa, Nigeria and Western Europe.

Map of the Congolese Diaspora in the World

- Cornish people migrated from Cornwall to other parts of England and countries such as the United States, Canada, Australia, New Zealand, South Africa, and Brazil. The diaspora was caused by a number of factors, but due mainly to economic reasons and the lack of jobs in the 18th and 19th centuries when many Cornish people, or "Cousin Jacks" as they were known, migrated to various parts of the world in search of a better life. (see also Cornish emigration).
- Crimean Tatar diaspora – formed after the annexation of the Crimean Khanate by Russia, in 1783.
- Croatian diaspora – Largest number of Croatians living outside Europe are in the US, Argentina, Chile, Canada, Australia, Peru, Venezuela and Brazil.

Map of the Croatian Diaspora in the World

- Cuban diaspora – the exodus of over one million displaced Cubans (the largest community is in Miami and its metropolitan area in the United States) following the Cuban Revolution of 1959. (See also Cuban Americans). Other preferred countries, including Spain, Mexico, Venezuela (not as much today), Ireland, Australia, and Nicaragua.

Map of the Cuban Diaspora in the World

== D ==
- Danish people a.k.a. Danes who originate in the Nordic country of Denmark. They have historically migrated all over Europe, and about a million Danish emigrants in the last two centuries to all the world's six inhabited continents. An example of Danish culture overseas is in Solvang, California in the United States. And returning Danish-Americans in 1909 founded a town in Denmark near Aalborg.

Map of the Danish Diaspora in the World

- Delaware Tribe of Indians (Oklahoma United States) and Leni-Lenape people in Northeastern US, they are scattered throughout the US, extending to Mexico and Canada. See also Shawnee; Chickasaw and Choctaw; and Seminole peoples resettled in Indian Territory, 1838–1907.
- Dominican people from the Dominican Republic formed a Dominican diaspora. Today, over a million Dominicans live in the United States (see Dominican American), followed by Canada, Venezuela, Argentina (see Dominican Argentine), Spain and elsewhere. Dominicans lived outside the country in over a century (since 1900) but especially since the 1960s, Dominicans leave the country in search of available work and employment opportunities. Dominican immigration to Puerto Rico beginning in 1990 became very high in numbers per ratio to Puerto Rico's population, including illegal entries on dangerous rafts through the Mona Passage between the two islands (see Hispaniola). Dominicans now form 10% of New York City's population and 1/8 of Manhattan or New York County's, they became the city's largest Latino group.

Map of the Dominican Diaspora in the World

- Dutch diaspora – the Dutch originally came from the Low Countries and northern France. Millions of Dutch descendants have traditionally lived in the United States (Dutch American), Canada, Australia, New Zealand, Indonesia, Sri Lanka, Africa (Afrikaners), the Caribbean (Aruba and Netherlands Antilles), and Suriname, and some Dutch immigrants to South America.

Map of the Dutch Diaspora around in the World

  - Flemings, a subgroup of Dutch/Low German speaking people of the country of Belgium, about 50-55% of the country's population speaks Dutch – also called Flemish, one of Belgium's two major and three official languages. Flemings migrated to all the six continents of the world, sometimes in droves to nearby countries of France and the Netherlands, other European nations of the UK, Germany and Sweden, and they founded new settlements. The Azores, a Portuguese territory was once called the Islas de las Flamandes (the Fleming Islands) in the 16th century. The West Flemish population in the Nord département of France struggle to preserve their endangered language.
  - Frisians, an ethnic group related to the Dutch live in the Frieslands on the northern half of the Netherlands, along with northwestern Germany and southernmost Denmark. The Frisians have their own language, history and customs. Frisians are thought to date back 5,000 years, migrated to the Rhine delta by the North Sea and were successful in draining out the marshes to make it inhabitable to establish cities and farmland. Frisians also migrated worldwide, a number of them were employed in the oceanic fishing markets.

== E ==
- Ecuadorian diaspora – Ecuadorians from Ecuador reside in countries across the Americas (i.e. the US, see Ecuadorian Americans, also in Canada, Mexico, Argentina, Venezuela and Brazil), Europe (esp. Spain and Italy, with some in France and elsewhere), and smaller numbers in Japan and Australia.

Map of the Ecuadorian Diaspora in the World

- (Egyptian) Coptic diaspora – About 3 million Coptic Christians, members of the Coptic Christian Church based in Egypt for about 2,000 years, live around the world. The largest numbers are in North America and Australia; and Great Britain, Germany, Greece, Italy, Norway and Sweden in Europe.
- Egyptian diaspora – 9.5 million Egyptians living abroad.

Map of the Egyptian Diaspora in the World

- Estonian diaspora – When Estonia was invaded by the Soviet Army in 1944, large numbers of Estonians fled their homeland on ships or smaller boats over the Baltic Sea. Many refugees who survived the risky sea voyage to Sweden and/or Germany later moved from there to Canada, the United Kingdom, the United States and/or Australia. Also, with the June deportation of 1941 and March deportation of 1949, the Soviet Union forcibly transferred tens of thousands of Estonians to Siberia. Some of these refugees and their descendants returned to Estonia after the nation regained its independence in 1991. The Russian Empire displaced a fairly high number of Estonians into exile, maybe the number of descendants (the 3.5 million outside Estonia) to have assimilated into Russian society. The Estonian people are generally small in size (0.9 million within Estonia), but doesn't it include Estonian sub-groups: the Chudes, Livonians, Setos and Voros in neighboring lands of Russia, Latvia and Lithuania. There is no way to know the corrected number of Estonians, unless to count 100,000 dual nationals in the former USSR or the number of expatriates in the EU countries (esp. Finland).

Map of the Estonian Diaspora in the World

== F ==
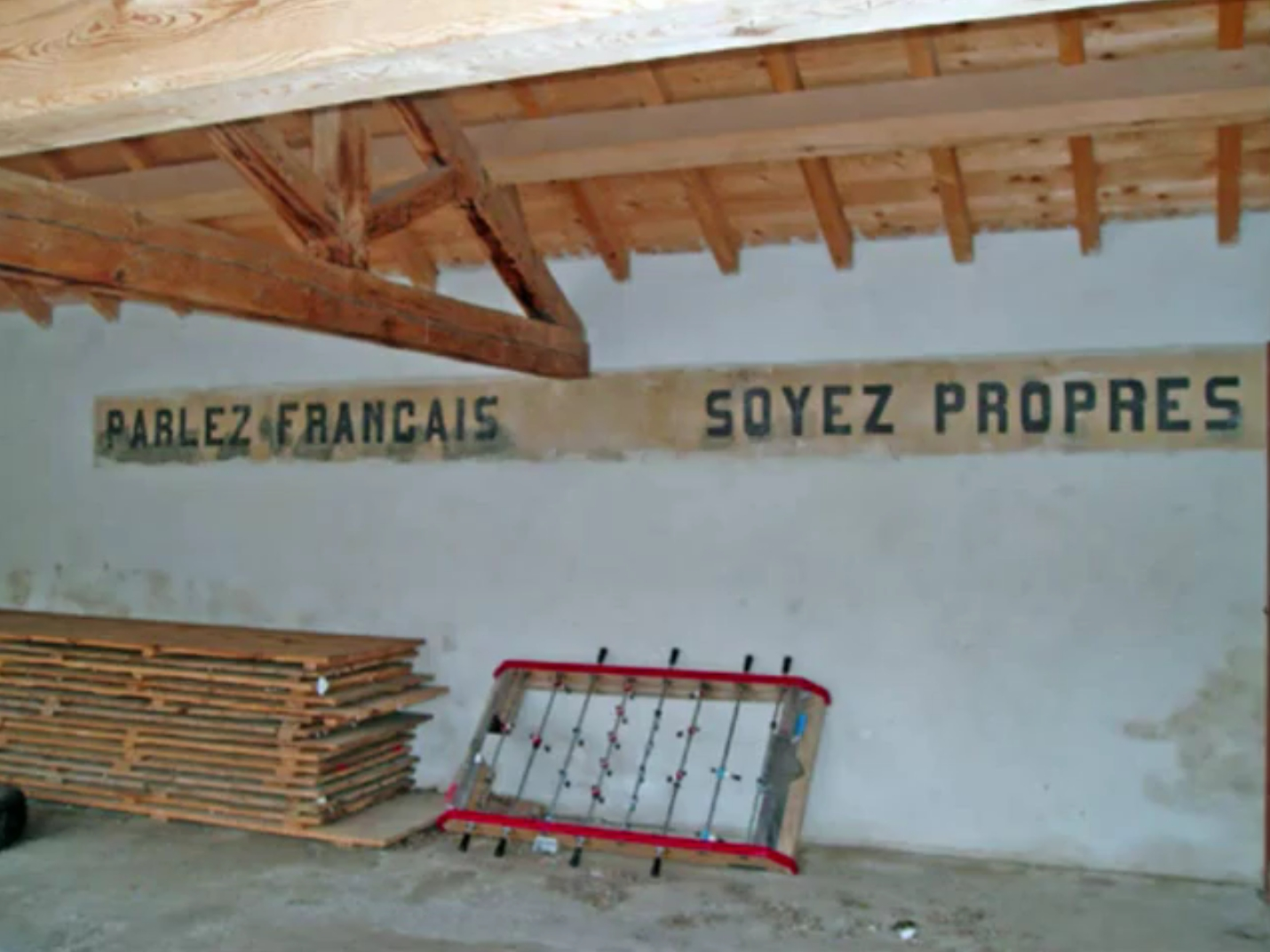
"Speak French, Be Clean" written across the wall of a Southern French school, a byproduct of the French Government policy to eradicate Occitan and all regional languages in the late 19th and early 20th centuries.

- Fiji Indian diaspora – people of Indian origin left Fiji following the racially inspired coups of 1987 and 2000 to settle primarily in Australia, New Zealand, United States and Canada. Smaller numbers have settled in England and other Pacific islands.
- Filipino diaspora – one of the largest diasporas that came from Asia (amounting approximately 20 million) made up of a variety of ethnic, linguistic and regional groups that are originally from the Philippines and live around the world, often for Southeast Asia, East Asia, Oceania, the Middle East, North America, and Europe. Majority of them are migrant workers. Overseas Filipino Workers have their own political party in the Philippine Congress.

Map of the Filipino Diaspora in the World

- French diaspora – Over 100 million French-speaking and ethnic French people in the world, about 55 million in Metropolitan France in Europe, 3 million in Belgium known as the Walloons, 3 million in western cantons of Switzerland and 2 million others in adjacent areas of Luxembourg, the kingdoms of Andorra and Monaco, and parts of western Italy, southwest Germany and northern Spain. This includes the remnants of Pied-Noirs in formerly French territories of North Africa – the now independent nations of Algeria, Morocco and Tunisia; and in Southeast Asia (formerly French Indochina) – the now independent nations of Cambodia, Laos and Vietnam; and millions of those of French ancestry in North America (i.e. a major contributor of settlement in the US and 8 million French-Canadians in Canada), South America and the Caribbean, and Oceania (i.e. New Caledonia and French Polynesia).

Map of the French Diaspora in the World

  - French Canadian diaspora – includes hundreds of thousands of people who left Quebec for the United States (most went to New England states of Maine, Massachusetts, New Hampshire and Vermont), as well as Ontario and Western Canada, between about 1840 and 1930. In addition, since the 1970s Florida and other portions of the Southeastern United States have had sizable French-Canadian communities, consisting chiefly of retired senior citizens.
  - The Acadian diaspora – the Great Expulsion (Grand Dérangement) occurred when the British expelled about 10,000 Acadians (over three-fourths of the Acadian population of Nova Scotia) between 1755 and 1764. The British split the Acadians between different colonies to impose assimilation. Most of the French-speaking Acadians resettled in the then Spanish colony of Louisiana, now a state of the US where the "Cajuns" influenced the ethnological background of Louisiana. The Cajuns settled along bayous and rivers in Louisiana and have their own Cajun cooking. In New Orleans, French people from France, along with high admixture with Anglo-American, African, Spanish and other ethnicities introducing Jazz music and Creole cooking.
  - Walloons, in the southern half of Belgium. Several languages part of the langue d'oil family of languages, where spoken in Wallonia. (Atlas linguistique de la Wallonie ) In Belgium, due to French annexation in 1795 of what was to become Belgium, and French being at that time a lingua franca of European Elites (including that of Bourgeois and Aristocrats living in regions and cities currently part of Wallonia and Flanders ), the French language has been imposed as official language. At a later state, the Dutch language and, after their annexation as war reparations, the German in the easternmost parts are given co-official status. Many Walloon miners, factory workers and farmers migrated to France, Germany, Netherlands, Sweden and the UK; and other French and Dutch/Belgian colonial lands (i.e. Belgian Congo and Democratic Republic of the Congo formerly Zaire).
  - Occitans are persons from Southern France, some are known to speak the Occitan language or Langue D'Oc for thousands of years, but in general decline from pressures by the French Republican government since the early 19th century. Occitans were often felt denied the right of their cultural heritage and some relocated out of France in quiet protest to other countries, esp. French-speaking Canada and other parts of La Francophonie (French Empire and French-speaking areas of Europe). Also there have been Occitan-speaking settlers in Pigüé, Argentina; sporadically Mexico and Chile; and even into the United States in Valdese, North Carolina. Occitania is a regional-cultural movement that developed since the 1970s throughout the southern half of France with adjacent parts of Switzerland, Italy and Spain.
  - Huguenots, or French Protestants. They often migrated out of France in the 1600s and 1700s to nearby Protestant majority lands like Netherlands, Germany, the UK, the United States and Canada (then British North America), South Africa, and other lands like Switzerland, Scandinavia, Poland (the Prussian Empire), Hungary; and Australia and New Zealand in the 19th century.
  - Corsicans from the French administered island of Corsica, see Corsican immigration to Venezuela, Corsican immigration to Puerto Rico and Corsican American.

== G ==
- Galicians – left their region for mainly economic reasons to other areas of Spain and nearby Portugal; and to the Americas (esp. Argentina, Brazil, Canada, Cuba, Dominican Republic, Mexico, Puerto Rico, the United States, Uruguay Venezuela); and later, Western Europe (Austria, Germany, Switzerland, France, Belgium, the Netherlands and the United Kingdom) in the 1950s and 1960s. Galicians also went to Africa, Australia, New Zealand and east Asia: China, Japan and the Philippines which was a former Spanish colony from 1540 to 1898.

Map of the Galician Diaspora in the World

- German diaspora – an estimated 150 million ethnic Germans originally from the historic German-speaking homeland of Germany, Austria, Switzerland, South Tyrol and Liechtenstein, and includes parts of Belgium (see the German-speaking Community of Belgium), Croatia, Denmark, France (esp. the region of Alsace), Gottschee County of Slovenia, Italy (formerly ruled by Austria-Hungary), Lithuania, Luxembourg, the Netherlands, Pannonia (Bosnia-Herzegovina), Poland, Romania, Russia, Serbia and Ukraine. In World War II, Poland, Czechoslovakia, Hungary, and Yugoslavia expelled over 10 million ethnic Germans from the Sudetenland, Czechoslovakia (now Czech Republic) and former German provinces which were annexed by Poland, Slovakia, Hungary and the former USSR (Belarus) with Soviet and Allied support. In the 18th, 19th and 20th centuries, millions of Germans left German lands especially to the Americas (i.e. the United States-see German American, Canada, Mexico, Argentina, Brazil, Chile, Colombia, Panama, Peru and Venezuela). Large numbers also migrated to Australia, where they now form the fourth largest ethnic group, with nearly 750,000 people claiming German descent. Other smaller German communities in Africa or the Middle East (i.e. Egypt, Israel, Kenya, Morocco, Namibia, South Africa, Tanzania and Turkey), east Asia/Oceania (i.e. China, India, Indonesia, Japan, Malaysia, Philippines, Singapore and New Zealand), and across the former Soviet Union (i.e. Kazakhstan).
  - German Russians – Russians of German descent who settled in the Russian Empire in the 1600s and 1700s. The highest concentration are in the Volga region (Volga Germans). The majority of the German-Russian population left in the 1800s and 1900s, esp. after World War II to Germany, the US and all over the world.
  - "Ossi(e)s" – a term for former East Germans of the former East Germany or the German Democratic Republic in contrast to the "Wessies" or West Germans. The two countries reunified in 1990, but there is a level of Ostalgie (means East-Nostalagia) for the past and cultural aspects of East Germany. When the Berlin Wall fell and the East-West German border was demolished, hundreds of thousands of Eastern Germans moved to the west side not only for freedom, but for the additional quality of life and economic opportunities available in the west, but after reunification a good percentage returned to what is now the same country. The 5 states of the former East (see New states of Germany) remained culturally distinct, mainly the older generation whom grew up in the GDR era. In 1989, there was an influx of East Germans into opened countries of the Soviet Bloc: Hungary, Czechoslovakia and Poland with some western embassies, esp. East Germans went to obtain passports from the Federal Republic of (West) Germany; and others went to neutral nations like Austria, Belgium, Denmark, Netherlands, Scandinavia and Switzerland for political reasons as some were still sympathetic to communist ideals. Some smaller numbers of East Germans chose to move in various countries of Western Europe and the Americas as well the former Soviet Union, but most returned home in the course of the 1990s. Germany may be reunified, but some "Ossie" cultural identity remains.
  - Danube Swabians – Ethnic German (Austrian) communities in Hungary.
  - Mennonites – Christians rooted in the 16th and 17th century Anabaptist movement of the Protestant Reformation in northern Europe. Various groups of Mennonites migrated to the US, other parts of North America (i.e. Belize, Canada mainly in Saskatchewan and northern Mexico), eastern Europe and Asia (including Israel and Egypt in Africa). There are Mennonite settlements in Central and South America (esp. in the Gran Chaco, Paraguay) and over a million Mennonite adherents worldwide.
  - Pennsylvania Dutch a corrupted term of "Pennsedeutsch" in Pennsylvania, US, where a large (in demographic terms) German American cultural presence exists to this day. The Pennsylvania German language is decreasing in use, but has a history in the state going back 350 years (since 1660).
  - Barossa German spoken by a colony of German-Australians in the Barossa valley, South Australia, Australia.

Map of the German Diaspora in the World

- Gerashi diasporas – The people of Gerashi origin (of Iran) who have migrated to the Arab States of the southern Persian Gulf in search of necessities and basic human rights. It has continued since the early 20th century bombing of the city by Reza Shah and the federal forces.
- Ghanaian diaspora – Are people from the nation of Ghana living abroad. Significant populations can be found in Australia, Brazil, Canada, Germany, Italy, the Netherlands, South Africa, United Kingdom and United States.

Mapa of the Ghanaian Diaspora in the World

- Greek diaspora – refers to any ethnic Greek populations living outside the borders of Greece and Cyprus as a result of modern or ancient migrations. There is a Department of Diaspora Affairs in the Greek government. An estimated three million Greeks live in North America (the United States and Canada), Africa, Australia (especially Melbourne, the third largest 'Greek' city), across Europe – the largest groups being established in Germany, Sweden and Belgium – and the Middle East. Ancient Greek communities in what is now Turkey were destroyed due to the fallout from World War I and persecution. A Greek community remains in Istanbul according to the terms of the Lausanne treaty, but persecution in the 1950s and 1960s led most to flee. Only a small community (Pontic Greeks) remain in Turkey. A similarly ancient community of Greeks in Alexandria and Cairo was ordered to leave Egypt in the 1960s under Nasser's nationalisation programme. In addition, many Greek-speaking Cypriots migrated to Britain in the 20th century.

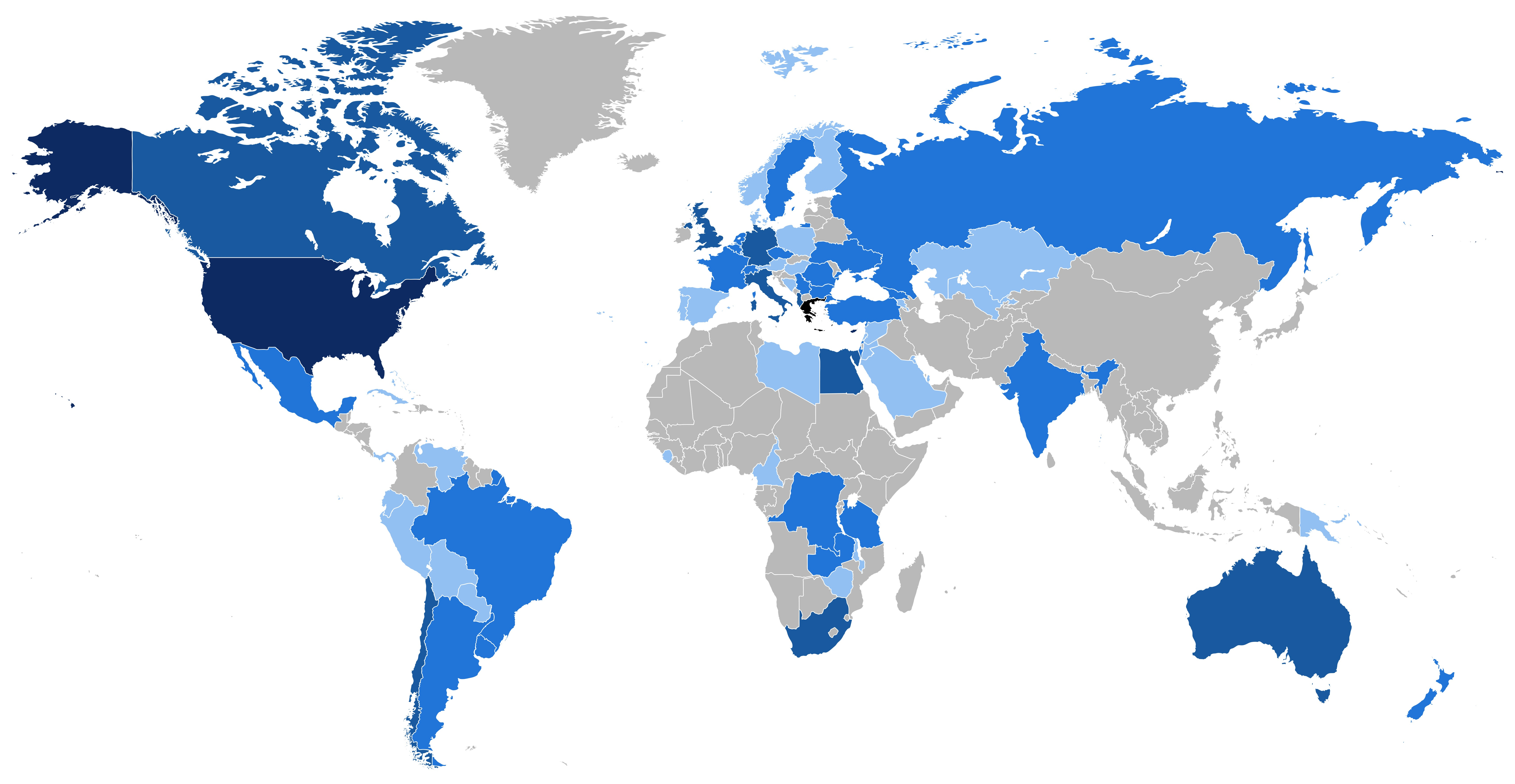
Mapa of the Greek Diaspora in the World

== H ==
- Habesha diaspora – the peoples of the Ethiopian Empire and its successor states of Eritrea and Ethiopia have migrated over the years due to political unrest, ethnic tensions, and civil wars like the Deg's Ethiopian Revolution, Red Terror (Ethiopia) Ethiopian Civil War, 1983–1985 famine in Ethiopia and Eritrea, Eritrean War of Independence, Eritrean–Ethiopian War, and other present conflicts and upheavals. The Habesha peoples have used various ethnological names like "Abyssinians", "Erthyreneans", "Habesha", "Oromo", "Amharic", "Eritrean", "Ethiopian", and "[Insert Name of Ethnic Group]" depending on the time period they fled, their national origin, their political position, regional ancestry, or which of the approximately 85 to 89 constituent ethnic groups they come from.
  - Eritreans – Around half a million of the total five million Eritreans fled the country during the thirty-year Eritrean War of Independence as well as fleeing violence perpetuated by the Eritrean government (EPLF–PFDJ). They have formed communities all over the western world (i.e. United States in Washington, D.C., and Los Angeles; and Europe: Sweden, Germany and Italy). There are more than half a million Eritreans in refugee camps (most in Ethiopia and Sudan).
  - Ethiopians – A mass movement of Ethiopian migration during the 20th century into the Middle East (mostly Israel), Europe, South Asia, East Asia, Australia, North America (esp. the United States and Canada), and Latin America caused by ethnic violence, politically unrest, and violence perpetuated by the Ethiopian government* (EPRDF) has created a global Ethiopian diaspora.
- Haitian diaspora – many white and mixed race Haitians migrated to Cuba and then New Orleans, Louisiana after the Haitian Revolution. More recently, many black Haitians have migrated to the United States and Canada. Others live in the Bahamas, Cuba, the Dominican Republic, and French Guiana. There are also smaller numbers in Belgium, France, Spain, and Venezuela. Increasingly, Haitians are searching for employment in Argentina, Chile, Mexico and Brazil.

Map of the Haitian Diaspora in the World

- Hapa – The modern term for mixed-race persons of Asian-Americans of white/Caucasian and Native Hawaiian ancestry. (see also Multiracial American) They tend to live across the US and western Canada, due to historic migration of Hawaiians into North America.
- Hispanics or Latinos in the US are sometimes referred to as a newly developed "diaspora" or dispersions of immigrant peoples from Latin America into the United States, and ethnic groups continued their cultural distinction, such as Chicanos or Mexican Americans, Puerto Rican people, Cuban Americans, etc.
- Hongkonger diaspora – lives in communities in cities such as London, UK; Toronto, Canada; California, United States; and Sydney, Australia. See Hongcouver the largest Hongkonger community in Vancouver, British Columbia and yacht people.
- Hungarian diaspora – lives in numerous communities across Europe, former USSR, North America and Australia. Historic Hungary extended into parts of Czech Republic, Slovakia, Romania, Serbia and Ukraine. For over 300 years, either they migrated west for economic opportunities or as political refugees, such as the failed Hungarian revolution of 1956 against the Communist government, when over 200,000 Hungarians fled the country for asylum in the United States, Canada, the United Kingdom, France, Switzerland, Germany, Austria (historic Austria-Hungary empire), Brazil, Argentina and Venezuela. It used to be Argentina and Venezuela had Hungarian immigrants before economic conditions worsened.

Map of the Hungarian Diaspora in the World

== I ==
- Icelandic diaspora: at an estimated number of 150,000, half of which are in Canada. See Icelanders.

Map of the Icelandic Diaspora in the World

- Igbo diaspora: One of the aftermaths of the devastating 1967–1970 Biafran War was the large scale emigration of Igbos from their homeland of Igboland in search of economic opportunities and generally better standard of living. Prior to that, millions of Igbo men and women were shipped to the Americas during the Atlantic Slave Trade. Today, places with the most population of diaspora Igbos and people of Igbo descent are the United States, the United Kingdom, Canada, Spain, Haiti and the West Indies.
- Inuit, their homeland spans across 4,000 miles (6,400 km) of northernmost reaches of North America along the Arctic Ocean. About 800,000 Arctic peoples (a.k.a. "Eskimos", a term that includes non-Inuit Arctic peoples such as Aleuts and Yupik peoples) live in four countries: The U.S. (Alaska, though most Alaska Natives are not Inuit), Canada (Nunavut is a territorial government established in 1999, Inuvialuit in the Northwest Territories, Nunavik in Quebec, Nunatsiavut and NunatuKavut in Labrador), Greenland (the "Greenlandic" people, the majority are of Inuit and Danish-European ancestry), self-ruling territory of Denmark, and about 3,000 Siberian Yupik (closely related to the Alutiiq and Yup'ik of Alaska) in the Chukchi Peninsula, Russia facing the Bering Strait.
- Indian Diaspora: They are broadly divided into two groups i.e. NRIs (Indian citizens not residing in India) and PIOs (Persons of Indian Origin who have acquired the citizenship of some other country). Major populations exist in Mauritius (where they form the majority), Guyana, Trinidad and Tobago, Suriname, Fiji, Malaysia, South Africa, Nepal and Réunion, primarily from 19th century indentured workers. Recent immigration to Canada, United Arab Emirates, United Kingdom and the United States (see Desi, a nickname for Indian Americans).

Map of the Indian Diaspora in the World

- Indochinese diaspora – includes the refugees from the numerous wars that took place in Southeast Asia, such as World War II and the Vietnam War.
  - The Vietnamese diaspora – fled communist rule in Vietnam following their victory in the Vietnam War (see South Vietnam) went to the United States (see Vietnamese Americans), the migration peaked in the 1980s and 1990s (esp. the largest Vietnamese-American communities in California, Texas, and Philadelphia). The Vietnamese also went to Canada, France (and overseas territories), Germany (also the Vietnamese guest workers in the former Communist East Germany), Italy, the Middle East, Australia, and other Asian countries (most went to Hong Kong, when it was a British colony, before the handover to the People's Republic of China in 1997, and Macau, which was under Portuguese rule until the handover to the People's Republic of China in 1999).
  - The wave of Hmong tribes from Laos, Laotians, Cambodians and Thai refugees and economic immigrants (Vietnamese who arrived since 1990) arrived in North America (i.e. the United States and Canada), Europe (esp. France), across Asia (most went to Thailand), Oceania (Australia) and South America (concentrated in French Guiana).
  - Some millions of Indochinese were of ethnic Chinese descent, the majority of Chinese/Sino-Vietnamese from Vietnam, Chinese-Cambodians of Cambodia and Thai-Chinese of Thailand had emigrated in the late 20th century.
- Indonesian diaspora – refers to any ethnic in Indonesia living outside of their homeland, the majority of Indonesian expatriates live in Malaysia, the US, Japan, the U.A.E., Australia, and the Netherlands, esp. South Moluccans, a predominantly Christian ethnic group found asylum and religious freedom by the thousands in the Netherlands since the 1950s.
  - Acehnese diaspora – From the Aceh state in Sumatra.
  - Malays diaspora – From neighboring Malaysia (East and West).
  - Minangkabau diaspora – two out of three Minangkabau people live in diaspora. Matrilineal system indirectly caused the diaspora in Minangkabau community. Nowadays, over a million Minangkabau people living outside of Indonesia, mainly in Malaysia and Singapore, but they recently joined the Indonesian emigration to Australia, China, Europe, Japan, South Korea, Taiwan and the Philippines.
  - Javanese diaspora – occurred in the Dutch colonial era. Vast numbers of Javanese send to other Dutch colonies as coulies. Most of them were sent to Suriname, New Caledonia, and East Sumatra, as well in the late 20th century the Javanese were introduced to the island of New Guinea by Indonesian government endorsed settlement programs in Papua and West Papua provinces. Others live in Malaysia, Europe, North America, the Middle East, South Africa and Australia.
  - Indo diaspora – During and after the Indonesian National Revolution, which followed the World War II, (1945–1965) around 300.000 people, predominantly Indos, left Indonesia to go to the Netherlands. This migration was called repatriation. The majority of this group had never set foot in the Netherlands before.

Map of the Indonesian Diaspora in the World

- Iranian diaspora (see Persian diaspora).

Map of the Iranian Diaspora in the World

- Iraqi diaspora – Refugees from Iraq have increased in number since the US-led invasion into Iraq in March 2003. As of November 4, 2006, the UNHCR estimated that 1.8 million Iraqis had been displaced to neighboring countries, with nearly 100,000 Iraqis fleeing to Syria and Jordan each month. There are over 200,000 Iraqi refugees said to reside in Egypt and 100,000 more in the Persian Gulf states. The main destinations for Iraqi immigration in the 2000s (decade) are the UK, Sweden, Germany, Canada, Australia and South America (i.e. Brazil). However, there is a large Iraqi community in the United States (see Arab American and Iraqi American) and some of the community in the US arrived as early as the 1900s-10s.

Map of the Iraqi Diaspora in the World

- Irish diaspora – consists of Irish emigrants and their descendants especially in countries such as the United States (see Irish Americans), the United Kingdom (see Irish migration to Great Britain and Irish-Scots, not to be confused with Ulster-Scots aka Scots-Irish), Canada (see Irish Canadians, Irish Quebecers, Irish Newfoundlanders), Australia (see Irish Australians), New Zealand (see Irish New Zealanders), and Argentina (see Irish Argentine), where vibrant Irish communities continue to exist. To a lesser extent, Irish people also immigrated to Chile (see Irish Chilean), Brazil (see Irish Brazilians), Uruguay (see Irish Uruguayan), Mexico (see Irish immigration to Mexico), South Africa (see Irish South African), and nations of the Caribbean (see Irish immigration to Barbados, Irish people in Jamaica, Irish immigration to Puerto Rico, Irish immigration to Saint Kitts and Nevis) and continental Europe (see Irish people in mainland Europe). The diaspora contains over 80 million people and it is the result of mass migration from Ireland, due to past famines (especially the Great Famine), poverty, and political oppression. The term first came widely into use in Ireland in the 1990s when the then-President of Ireland, Mary Robinson began using it to describe all those of Irish descent. Notable people of the global Irish diaspora are United States president John F. Kennedy (Roman Catholic), United States president Ronald Reagan (partially, not Catholic), United States president Joe Biden, and Chilean liberator Bernardo O'Higgins.

Map of the Irish Diaspora in the World

Map of the Italian diaspora in the world

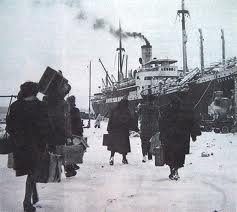
Istrian Italians leave Pola in 1947 during the Istrian-Dalmatian exodus

- Italian diaspora – occurred mainly between the 1890s and 1930s due to the economic crises and poverty in Italy, with emigrant numbers reaching into the tens of million. Vast numbers of mostly Southern Italians immigrated to the United States (see Italian Americans and Sicilian Americans) and Canada (see Italian Canadians, Italian Canadians in the Greater Toronto Area, Italians in Montreal) during this period, though immigration to North America (especially Canada) also picked up after World War II, most notably from the 1950s to 1970s.
  - Italian immigrants to North America, the majority of which came from Southern Italy, settled mainly in the Northeastern United States and various industrial cities in the Midwestern United States, such as Chicago, though significant but smaller communities evolved in cities such as New Orleans, San Diego, and San Francisco (with most Italians on the West Coast coming from Northern Italy.) In many of these American cities, Italian immigrants and their offspring established Italian ethnic communities known as "Little Italies." In most cases, these Italian communities generally began as impoverished neighborhoods, or effectively "ghettos" for Italian immigrants. (See Little Italy, List of Italian-American neighborhoods, Template:Italian Americans by location). In the United States and Canada, both historically Protestant countries with majority populations of people of Northwestern European descent, Italian immigrants experienced fierce and often violent anti-Italianism and discrimination, especially prior to the 1960s.
  - Italians also immigrated in vast numbers to South America, mainly to Brazil (see Italian Brazilian), Argentina (an estimated one-third to half of Argentines are of Italian descent, with some higher estimates putting Italian Argentines at 60% of the population (see also Italian Argentine), Uruguay (Italian Uruguayans constitute an estimated 40% of the population of Uruguay. See Italian Uruguayans), Chile (see Italian Chilean), Venezuela (see Italo-Venezuelans), and Paraguay (30% of the population of Paraguay, see Italians in Paraguay), although Italians also arrived in notable numbers elsewhere in Latin America (i.e. Colombia (Italian Colombians), Mexico (Italian-Mexicans), Panama, Puerto Rico (see Corsican immigration to Puerto Rico), Costa Rica (Italian Costa Ricans), Cuba (Italian Cubans), Peru (Italian Peruvians), Guatemala (Italian Guatemalans), and Haiti (Italian Haitians). In contrast to the Italian immigrants to North America, a slight but significant majority of Italian immigrants to South America were Northern Italians from Veneto and other depressed Northern Italian areas, though Southern Italians from areas such as Sicily, Campania, and Calabria still constituted a significant percentage of Italian immigrants to South America, and later Italian immigration to South America from World War II to the 2000s has consisted mostly of Southern Italians.
  - Though Italians began immigrating to Australia in small but significant numbers since the early 20th Century, the biggest wave of Italian immigration to Australia occurred after World War II and in the later part of the 20th century, with most Italian immigrants to Australia being Southern Italians (see Italian Australians and Italian community of Melbourne).
  - Many Italians also immigrated north to other European countries offering better economic prospects. Italian immigration to France began in large numbers after World War I at a time when France needed a large workforce to compensate for the war losses and its very low birthrate. Initially, Italian immigration to modern France (late 18th to the early 20th century) came predominantly from northern Italy (Piedmont, Veneto), then from central Italy (Marche, Umbria), mostly to the bordering southeastern region of Provence. It wasn't until after World War II that large numbers of immigrants from southern Italy immigrated to France, usually settling in industrialized areas of France, such as Lorraine, Paris and Lyon. (See Italians in France). Italian immigration to the United Kingdom became notable around the time of World War I and picked up in intensity for a period after World War II before slowing in the 1960s. (See: Italians in the United Kingdom, Italian Scots, Italian Welsh). With Germany's post-World War II economic boom, a large wave of immigrants from Italy settled in Germany. Since the establishment of freedom of movement for workers between the two countries in 1961, more than 580,000 Italians also migrated to Germany for work, mainly from southern and northeastern Italy. (See Italians in Germany). Italians also notably immigrated in large numbers in search of economic opportunities in Switzerland after World War II. In 1970, there were around a million immigrants in Switzerland, 54% of whom were Italians. Rising friction with the indigenous majority even led to the creation of an "anti-Italian party" in 1963, with anti-Italian sentiment leading to the 1971 murder of Italian migrant worker Alfredo Zardini by an anti-Italian xenophobe in Switzerland. (See Italian immigration to Switzerland). Italians also immigrated in significant numbers to Malta, the Netherlands, and Sweden (See Swedish Italians), while smaller numbers of Italians went to South Africa (see Italian South African) and Israel (Italian Jews). Italians have also established historical communities in Lebanon (see Italian Lebanese).
  - Small Italian expatriate communities once thrived until the mid-20th century in Africa and the Middle East (Algeria, Egypt, Eritrea, Ethiopia, Libya, Morocco, Syria, Tunisia and Turkey).
  - Istrian–Dalmatian exodus- Another diaspora came after the end of World War II, with 350,000 ethnic Italians (Istrian Italians and Dalmatian Italians) leaving their homeland on the eastern front after the capture of Istria and Dalmatia by the Yugoslavs. Most of them were relocated in Italy itself; a lower percentage flew overseas (the racer Mario Andretti for example).
  - Niçard exodus- It was one of the first emigration phenomena that involved the Italian populations in the contemporary age. It was due to the refusal of a quarter of the Niçard Italians to stay in Nice after its annexation to France in 1861, which was decided after the Plombières Agreement.
  - See also: Template:Italian diaspora, Calabrian diaspora, Sicily, Sicilians, Sicilian American and Italians in New York City.
  - Related: Maltese people, Maltese Americans, Maltese Australians, Maltese people in the United Kingdom, Maltese in Belgium; Gibraltarians in the United Kingdom; Corsican immigration to Puerto Rico, Corsican immigration to Venezuela, and Corsican American (Corsicans, Maltese people, and, to a much lesser extent, Gibraltarians share an ethnic, linguistic, cultural, and historical connection to Italy and immigrated abroad in large numbers at a similar time as the Southern Italians in early 20th century.) and Waldensians – a church with origins in Northern Italy.

== J ==
- Jassic (or Yassic) people, a small ethnic group of peoples that resided in enclaves in Hungary, Romania, throughout Russia and Ukraine. The Jassic are ethnologically related to the Ossetians of the Northern Caucasus range, along with other Iranian peoples in their linguistic similarities between the Iranian language. Their ancestral origin may have been of North Caucasian origins, perhaps mixed with peoples from Persia or Iran, and more precisely, the steppes of Central Asia about 3,000 years ago when migratory patterns of speakers of Indo-European and later Uralic languages arrived in Eastern Europe. The Jassic people are minuscule in number, dwindled down by each generation, and they were assimilated into the Hungarian population and Slavic majorities they lived among with.
- Jaffnese/Ceylonese Diaspora – refers to the diaspora of Sri Lankan Tamils, especially those post-1983 due to the civil conflict in Sri Lanka. This has created huge Tamil communities in countries such as Canada, the United States, Australia, the United Kingdom, Germany and other European countries. In many ways, the Jaffnese Diaspora is compared to the Jewish Diaspora, both historically, socially and economically. It is a subset of the greater Tamil Diaspora.
- Jamaican diaspora – An estimated 3 million Jamaicans live outside the island country of Jamaica, an English-speaking majority African descendant country in the Caribbean. The main destinations for Jamaican immigration in the 20th century are the U.S., Great Britain and Canada. But, Jamaican immigration across the Caribbean, to Latin America, Australia and New Zealand, and even Africa are well noted. Jamaicans living aboard, such as Bob Marley introduced the music form of reggae to the international music market in the 1970s.

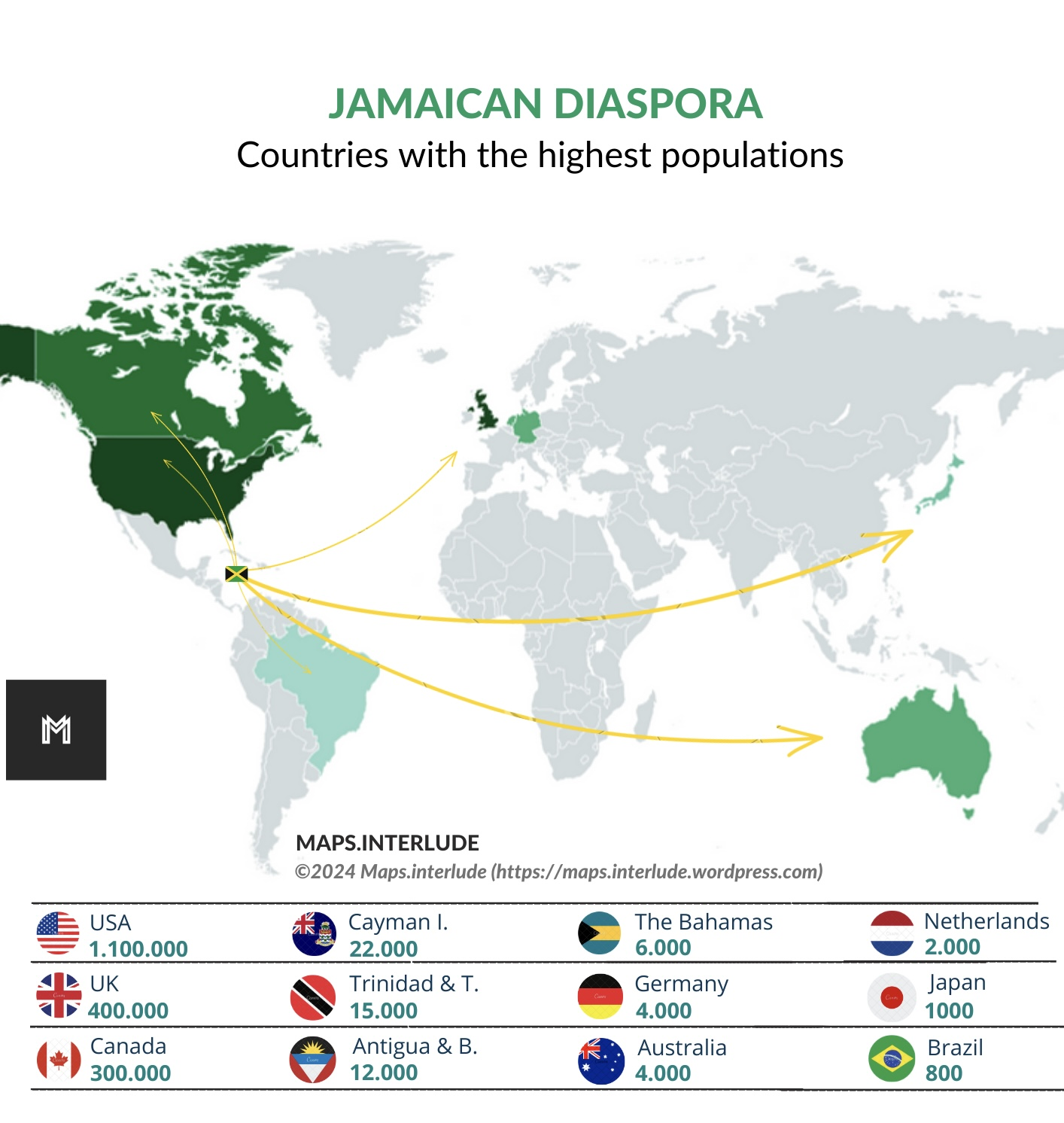
Map of the Jamaican Diaspora in the World

- Japanese diaspora – Brazil (see Japanese Brazilian), the United States (see Japanese Americans), Canada (See Japanese Canadian) and the Philippines (see Japanese Filipinos), as well sizable communities in Peru (see Japanese Peruvian), Argentina (see Asian Argentine), Chile and Ecuador, and smaller numbers of Japanese in Australia, New Zealand, Cuba, Venezuela and Mexico are the countries with the highest numbers of Japanese people outside Japan. The largest community of ethnic Japanese is in Hawaii where they make up a quarter of the state's population. However, there are smaller Japanese communities around the world that developed in the late 20th century such as throughout western Europe (esp. the Japanese expatriate colony in Düsseldorf, Germany), eastern Russia and South Africa. The Japanese population used to have nicknames to indicate generational levels: "Issei"-foreign born parents, next is "Nisei"-1st generation born outside Japan or children, and "Sansei"-2nd generation born outside Japan or grandchildren.

Map of the Japanese Diaspora in the World

- Jerez diaspora – People from the Spanish town of Jerez who live elsewhere. There is a committee that grants an honorary membership each year to the most relevant "jerezano" that lives outside Jerez and brings the name to the world. The president of the Diaspora de Jerez is Miguel Primo de Rivera. The committee has 6 members and votes are in two rounds.
- Jewish diaspora – in its historical use, refers to the period between the Roman occupation and subsequent deportation of Jews from Judea from 70 CE to the Middle Ages, to the re-establishment of Israel in 1948. In modern use, the 'Diaspora' refers to ethnic Jews who continue to live outside of Israel.
  - Ashkenazi Jews – large numbers of Jews were exiled or taken as slaves to Rome following the failed Jewish revolts against the Roman occupation. It is postulated by most scholars and geneticists that these Jews eventually migrated northward in the 8th century, settling alone the Rhine river, and were later joined by Jewish merchants and exiles from Israel in the 7th-8th centuries CE. Increased persecution pushed them into Eastern Europe, where they largely remained until the Zionist movement and/or World War II. Currently, North America (the USA has the world's second largest Jewish community) and western Europe are home to the vast majority of diaspora Jews.
  - Sephardi Jews – Unlike the Ashkenazim, who moved to the north, Sephardim moved westward and settled in what is now Spain and Portugal. In 1492, Isabella and Ferdinand of Spain expelled all Jews and Moors from their territory. The Sephardi Jews, as they were known, resettled across Southern Europe, North Africa, and the Middle East, whereas others went to Germany, Poland, and the Netherlands (where they merged with their Ashkenazi co-ethnics). Likewise, some went to Britain, North and South America, and other colonies of the British and Spanish empires by the late 16th century.
  - Mizrahi Jews: Nazi incitement in Arabia and Arab colonized lands throughout the rest of the MENA region, compounded by the re-establishment of Israel in 1948 resulted in an Arab axis aggression against both the newly reborn Jewish state and the Jewish communities in their midst. After the resulting 1948 Arab–Israeli War, about 700,000 Jews residing in other parts of the Middle East were expelled or fled from their countries of residence, and were subsequently dispossessed of nearly all of their property. The majority of these Jewish refugees made aliyah to Israel, or immigrated to France and the United States. By the Yom Kippur War of 1973, most of the Jewish communities throughout the Arab World, as well as Pakistan and Afghanistan, were practically non-existent. A total of 800,000–1,000,000 diaspora Jews left or fled from their homes in the Arab world, or were driven out in the Jewish exodus (1948–1972). As of today, less than 4,500 Jews live in the Arab world.
  - American Jews – currently the United States has the world's largest Jewish population outside Israel itself. Between 5.5 and 7.5 million observant Jews, and 1–2.5 million more of Jewish descent in the USA. New York City has 1.5-2 million out of 8-8.5 million people who are Jewish, while other demographers place Jews 10-15% of the NYC population. See Jews in New York City.
  - Haredi or Ultra-Orthodox Jews are a small percentage community of practicing in Judaism, the largest known Haredi/Hasidim community is in Williamsburg, Brooklyn, New York City of the Satmar and Lubavitch groups who originated in Hungary or Romania arrived in the US after WW2 when they experienced the Holocaust.

Map of the Jewish Diaspora in the World

Map of the Israeli Diaspora in the World

== K ==
- Kaszubian diaspora – the Kaszubians are a Slavic, Roman Catholic people who have lived and maintained their language and unique traditions for centuries despite living on the boundary between the Germanic and Polish cultures. Between 1850 and 1900, many Kaszubians moved to North America, to Brazil, and to Australia and New Zealand.
- Khmer people – The main ethnic group of Cambodia have historically emigrated in the 18th, 19th and esp. 20th centuries. The largest Cambodian communities are in the US, Canada, France, Thailand, Vietnam, China (with Hong Kong), Malaysia, Singapore, Australia, New Zealand, Great Britain and Arabia (i.e. the U.A.E).

Map of the Khmer Diaspora in the World

- Korean diaspora – a people from the Korean peninsula located between China and Japan. The first wave of Korean diaspora was during the Japanese colonial occupation (1910–1945), the peace treaty division of the Korean peninsula into two republics, the Korean War (1950–53) produced a wave of millions of war refugees who fled to the United States, Canada, China, Japan, the Philippines, South Vietnam until 1975, and the USSR, now Russia. Today, Korea remains a politically divided geographic unit. South Korea was under military rule 1953–1987, now a civilian democracy, but economic problems and a sense for adventure made over 500,000 South Koreans emigrate to the United States and Canada, and 100,000 more to Europe, Australia and South America (i.e. Brazil and Argentina). North Korea remains under an isolationist military state under Communism since 1948, while millions of political refugees fled to nearby China for freedom in the late 20th century. See also Jilin or "Kirin", a Chinese province with millions of native Koreans. And Koryo-Saram for ethnic Koreans in Russia, the majority live along the Amur River which is the Chinese-Russian border.

Map of the Korean Diaspora in the World

- Kosovan diaspora – Ethnic Albanian peoples from Kosovo in the former Yugoslavia and Serbia in the 1990s.

Map of the Kosovar Diaspora in the World

- Kurdish diaspora – Kurdish diaspora is the Kurdish populations found in regions outside their ancestral homeland Kurdistan. The United Nations declared the Kurds the largest ethnic nationality (over 40 million) without a country in the world.

Map of the Kurdish Diaspora in the World

== L ==
- Latvian diaspora – the majority of Latvians whom left Latvia in World War II reside in North America (the US and Canada), across Europe mainly in Eastern countries and the former USSR with just as many in Western Europe and Scandinavian nations, and the rest in former Latvian lands in the Baltic states (Estonia, Lithuania, Poland, Russia and Belarus). The most Russified of the three Baltic states, Latvia struggles with the issue of national identity after one million ethnic Russians and other Russian speaking people settled there since 1940. Currently in 2018, only 1/4 of Latvia's population (joined the European Union in 2004) are ethnic Russians.

Map of the Latvian Diaspora in the World

  - Latgalians, a predominantly Catholic people in eastern Latvia in the region of Latgale and have a close history with Lithuania, due to differences in church denomination between them and Latvians who are a majority Lutheran along with Estonians not ethnically related to Latvians and Lithuanians.
- Lebanese diaspora – An estimated 15-16 million Lebanese live worldwide. Over half of the country's population are of Muslim faith and the rest are Christians, but in the world Christians Lebanese outnumber Muslims by 3:1. Lebanese are found in over 150 countries, the largest known Lebanese community is in Brazil, the U.S. followed by Canada; and Australia, where Lebanese immigration has occurred in large numbers since the 1975–1990 civil war. Although there are millions of Lebanese descendants in Europe, and the Middle East, the Lebanese are also present in much of the continental span of Africa and Latin America.

Map of the Lebanese Diaspora in the World

- Lithuanian diaspora – the majority of post-World War II Lithuanians live in North America (Canada and the United States) and across Europe (France, Germany, Ireland, Poland, Sweden, Netherlands and England), but are scattered across Russia and the former USSR, and smaller numbers in Mexico and Brazil. Between 1880 and 1910, over 40,000 Lithuanian Jews immigrated to South Africa to avoid persecution. To date around 80% of the 75,000 Jews in South Africa (around 60,000) are of Lithuanian descent.
  - Litvins in northern Belarus and westernmost Russia of ethnic Lithuanian and Baltic origin.

Map of the Lithuanian Diaspora in the World

- Lusatian Sorbs, Sorbians or just Sorbs, their native homeland is in the Cottbus region of the state of Saxony of Germany, they also live in nearby Poland and the Czech Republic. They are the only surviving of the Slavic peoples native to the eastern half of Germany (until total German settlement and cultural absorption of all except the Sorbs by the early 19th century.)

== M ==
- Macedonian diaspora – formed from Macedonian refugees and economic migrants from Macedonia, to the United States, Australia, Canada, Germany, Sweden, New Zealand, South Africa, Argentina, Italy, Greece, and many other European Union states. There are approximately 2,500,000 Macedonians worldwide, with more than a third living outside North Macedonia.

Map of the Macedonian Diaspora in the World

- Maghrebi diaspora – consists of people from the North African countries, notably Algeria, Morocco and Tunisia. The largest Maghrebi community outside of North Africa is in France, where it is estimated that North Africans make up the majority of the country's Muslim population.
  - Algerian-French residents make up an estimated 5 to 8 percent of the ethnic makeup of France's population, despite the French government not keeping data records on race and ethnicity. Algerians resided in France for over 150 years as a result of the French colonial period in Algeria from 1830 to 1962, when the seven-year Algerian War brought independence. The largest North African French communities are in (and surrounding) Marseille, Paris, Lille, Nice and Lyon. A growing community in Canada and the UK came to light during the 1990s and the Algerian Civil War.
  - Non-Arab North Africans like Berbers (Amazighs) and Kabyles live in diaspora in Western Europe, esp. France.
  - Moroccans are found throughout the world, mainly in Europe (i.e. the largest being in France, followed by Spain, Italy, Belgium, the Netherlands, Germany, Sweden and Luxembourg) developed by Moroccan immigration since the 1950s, especially Western Europe and the Arab World (a large Jewish colony in Israel). Of the estimated 5.6 million Moroccans living abroad, 5.1 million live in Europe; the remainder are distributed throughout the Americas (including North America – mainly in Montreal, Quebec, Canada; and Latin America), Australia, Africa (in particular West Africa), and the countries of the Arab World. Some cities with a big Moroccan community are Paris, Lille, Roubaix, Marseille and Nice (every French city has a Moroccan community); Madrid, Barcelona and Málaga in Spain; Brussels, Antwerp and Liege in Belgium; Amsterdam and Rotterdam in the Netherlands; and Luxembourg. Half of the Moroccans living in Belgium (630,000), reside in its capital Brussels and a quarter in Antwerp, see Moroccans in Belgium.
  - Tunisians in Europe, the largest number of Tunisian expats live in France and Italy (former colonial rulers), Egypt, Israel, Turkey and throughout the European Union.

Map of the Algerian Diaspora in the World

Map of the Moroccan Daspora in the World

Map of the Tunisian Daspora in the World

Map of the Libyan Diaspora in the World

- Maltese diaspora: established mainly in the United Kingdom, Australia, Canada (Maltese Canadian) and the U.S. (Maltese American), as well throughout Europe and the Americas. Large communities existed in Algeria, Tunisia, Libya and Egypt but were mostly dispersed by the mid-20th century when these countries acquired independence. Since Malta's membership of the EU in 2004, new communities were established such as the one in Belgium.

Map of the Maltese Diaspora in the World

- Mexican Americans (Mexican diaspora)- over 20 million people of Mexican ancestry live in the United States, ranging from recent immigrants since the 1970s to long-established Americans of Spanish or Mexican descent. The majority of Mexican Americans live especially in the American Southwest, which borders with Mexico, an area that belonged to Mexico from 1821 to 1848. They were fundamental to development in the states of California, Texas, Arizona and New Mexico in the 20th century. Los Angeles is said to be the second largest Mexican city (home to 1 to 2 million alone- 31% of the city and 20% of the L.A. county population in 2015), while the populace of San Antonio is over half of Mexican descent. Also known by other ethnic self-titles, like Californios, Chicanos, Hispanos, La Raza, Nortenos in Northern California, Nuevomexicanos and Tejanos, however are officially called Hispanics and Latinos in terms of ethnic/cultural origins, but Mexican Americans had a large mestizo or mixed European/Native American heritage.

Map of the Mexican Diaspora in the World

- Moldovan diaspora – A Romanian province was divided many times in its history, they are of ethnically Romanian origin. A diaspora indicating most of the Moldovans who have moved out of Moldova. Most found their homes in the Soviet Union and the Baltics. There is also a diaspora in Western European countries such as Ireland, Spain, Portugal, Italy, France and the Netherlands.

Map of the Moldavian Diaspora in the World

- Moluccan diaspora – Begins in the 1950s as the result of the end of its occupation over Dutch Indies, the Netherlands government decided to transport around 12,000 Moluccan KNIL (The Royal Netherlands East Indies Army) the remaining men and their families to Europe. They were discharged on arrival and 'temporarily' housed in camps until it was possible for them to return to the Moluccan islands. Although The South Moluccan Republic has been declared on 25 April 1950, this movement was defeated by Indonesian government and the rest of RMS (Republik Maluku Selatan) followers leave their homeland and formatting a Government in Exile in the Netherlands since 1966. Nowadays, at least 200,000 Moluccan living side by side with Dutch people and becoming the biggest ethnic groups outside native Dutch in The Netherlands. The second wave happened during the civil war in Maluku 1999 to 2003, causing over 800,000 left the country. Most of the refugees moved to United States (mainly concentrated in Maryland, Florida, California and New York), Netherlands, France, Israel (mostly by Moluccan Jewish), Italy, Denmark, United Kingdom, Russia (mainly in St. Petersburg), Australia, Brazil, Portugal and Austria. After prosecuted, scattered, and finally settle down among the nations, latest statistics reporting the number of Moluccan in diaspora including their descendants (make up to 1.4 million) is a bit smaller than those who are staying in Indonesia (nearly 2.5 million).
- Moravian Church – has a nickname "the Moravian Diaspora" named from a religious, not ethnic' identity, having been founded in the province of Moravia, now in the Czech Republic. During the 16th and 17th centuries, religious persecution drove the majority of church members to other countries, and by the late 18th and 19th centuries, the church had managed to grow, thrive and survive. There are hundreds of thousands of Moravian church members in small communities in Europe (the Netherlands), the Americas (the United States), Africa (South Africa), east Asia (South Korea), the Indian subcontinent (India), and Oceania (Australia). However, the vast majority of these would consider themselves natives of the country where they live – the nickname (presumably) being of only historic interest.
- Mormons, a Christian religious group whose official name is the Church of Jesus Christ of Latter-day Saints, headquartered in Salt Lake City, as well smaller other churches based on Mormonism. Just under 50 percent of all Mormons live in the United States, while about three-fourths of the population of Utah are Mormon and form large minorities in 8 to 10 other Western U.S. states; and California is said to have the most LDS church members by population. Mormonism began as a small following of Christians who followed the teachings of Joseph Smith, founder of the Latter Day Saint movement in the early 19th century. The following were often forced to migrate and lived in the states of New York, Ohio, Illinois and Missouri by 1840. The Mormons were expelled by mob violence (Joseph Smith was killed) and persecution by neighbors in the 1840s and their new leader Brigham Young took the Mormons throughout the Great Plains and Rockies to settle the Salt Lake Valley, then a part of Mexico but soon to become part of the U.S., in 1847. Mormons play a fundamental role in the development of Utah and most other Western states, with Utah becoming a state in 1896. Today, an estimated 13 million Mormons are found around the world, after missionary activity and conversion programs extended the L.D.S. and other Mormon-based churches worldwide, the largest concentrations of Mormons other than the U.S. are Mexico, Canada, South America, the South Pacific (esp. in Fiji, Samoa and Tonga), Scandinavia, Britain and East Asia, but the fastest growth in Mormonism in the late 20th century was in Africa, India and Eastern Europe. In Chile, between 550 and 750,000 people out of the nation's 18.5 million are Mormon, and form a large community similar to Seventh-day Adventists and Jehovah's Witnesses due to US American churches missionary work in Latin America.
- Montenegrins, a diaspora of South Slavs in the country of Montenegro who had a 650-year tradition of independence and autonomy. They were a former republic of pre-1991 Yugoslavia and later a co-republic with Serbia until Montenegro declared independence in 2006. Over 1.3 million Montenegrins live in the Balkans, while half a million more are in Western Europe, 600,000 live in the US and another 1 million around the world (i.e. Canada, Brazil, Argentina, South Africa and Australia).

Map of the Montenegrin Diaspora in the World

- Muscogee (Creek)#Muscogee diaspora (1814), Muscogee#Muscogee Diaspora (today) Muscogee Diaspora, part of the Muscogee (Creek) Nation of Oklahoma, US (see Urban Indians). The largest communities are Detroit; Los Angeles; Nashville, Tennessee; Oakland, California; and Tulsa.

== N ==
- The Navajo Nation or Na-Dene, is said to cover not only the four-corner states of the Southwest US (Arizona, New Mexico, Utah and Colorado), but the "Na-Dene Diaspora" stretches from Fort Sumner (New Mexico) to Fort Sumter (So. Carolina), to Bosque Rodendo (N.M.) to Redondo Beach (California), Tuba City in Arizona or Yuba City Cal. and as far north as Fort Yukon, Alaska to Yukon near Oklahoma City and Kansas City (Kansas), and as far south as Mexico City. The dispersal of several hundred Native American tribes in the 18th and 19th centuries, also by BIA relocation programs into urban areas in the mid-20th century has indeed produced more Navajo/Dene people to indicate the Long Walk in the 1860s when 20,000 Navajo was forcibly removed then returned to their homeland (the Navajo Indian Reservation) was the beginning of the Na-Dene diaspora. An estimated 160,000 Navajo/Dene people live in the Southwest and about 250,000 more live across the U.S. (est. 400,000 citizens in 2022) with Navajo communities developed in Albuquerque; Chicago; Dallas, Texas; Denver; Kansas City, Missouri; Las Vegas, Nevada; Los Angeles; Minneapolis/St. Paul, Minnesota; Omaha, Nebraska; Phoenix, Arizona; and the San Francisco Bay Area.
- New Caledonia Kanaks – a Melanesian people native to the overseas French territory brought to Australia and New Zealand, and across Polynesia (The French territory of Tahiti) as agricultural workers in newly founded plantations during the late 19th and early 20th centuries. Most Kanak laborers in Australia were deported back to New Caledonia in the 1910s due to racial fears of Kanaks live among the country's white European-descent majority. Today, an estimated 30,000 Australian descendants of Kanaks live in the state of Queensland, where the main concentration of Australian plantation agriculture took place.
- Newfie, a colloquial name for people from the Canadian province of Newfoundland and Labrador, originally for inhabitants of the Island of Newfoundland. The Newfie diaspora frequently emigrated to other provinces of Canada for employment opportunities in the tens of thousands since the 1920s, while some Newfoundlanders went to the US and the UK in a lesser extent. Newfoundland became Canada's 10th province in 1949, after 350 years of British rule.
- New York City relocatees to other US states like Florida and California number at one million. The world-famous major city, the US' largest (8-9 million people), is known for its local subculture (esp. Brooklyn and the Bronx). Similarly, Bostonians, Michiganians and Californians moved across the US and the world.
- Nigerian diaspora, people from the country of Nigeria, the most populous country in Africa. Over 5 million Nigerians live outside the country, as immigrants are known to live in the US (Large Nigerian communities in New York City and Houston, Texas), the UK, throughout the EU and South Africa, among other nations. The Nigeria Diaspora is also one of the most organized Diasporas with an umbrella organization, Nigerians in Diaspora Organisation (NIDO America, NIDO Asia, NIDO Africa and NIDO Europe) represented with chapters in most countries and continents of the world. The organisation also have a Worldwide governing body NIDO Worldwide comprising stakeholders from the continental executives.
  - Yoruba people.
  - Igbo people.

Map of the Nigerian Diaspora in the World

- Norwegian people, the country of origin is Norway. Many Norwegians emigrated outward from there, while it was under Danish (until 1814) and later Swedish rule (until independence came in 1905). The largest group of Norwegians settled in North America (i.e. the US and Canada mainly in Manitoba) in the late 19th century, esp. in the states of Illinois, Minnesota, North Dakota and Wisconsin; and in the Pacific Northwest (Alaska, Oregon and Washington state). See Norwegian Americans and Norwegian Canadians.

Map of the Norwegian Diaspora in the World

== O ==
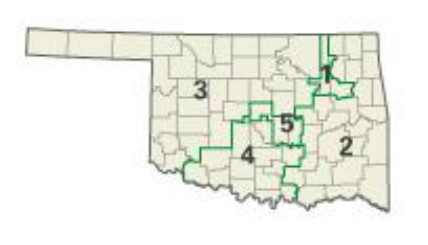
The Five congressional districts in Oklahoma. The Map shows districts 1 and 2 with parts of 3 4 and 5 are former Indian Territory from 1830 to 1907. The largest American Indian tribal groups live there in the eastern half of the state, most notably the Cherokee, Choctaw and Creek Indian Nations, whose populations mostly live outside of them.

- Okies from the U.S. state of Oklahoma. The state has a long history of settlement, emigration and mass dispersal of a subculture across the US and elsewhere in the world, due to economic conditions and conflicts with the U.S. government. Many happen to be Native Americans yet most of the population is white and a sizable minority are African American. Oklahoma was formerly reserved for Native Americans dislocated by white Euro-American settlement and the Indian Wars in the 19th century, mostly in the Great Plains of the United States and Western United States regions. See also Texans of Texas, Crackers of Florida and Southeastern United States where the main origin of Oklahomans came from. Includes Osage people – A Native American people who were originally from the Ohio Valley, they migrated into the Central Plains region in the 19th century and finally, Indian Territory (now Osage Nation the U.S. state of Oklahoma, the majority live in Osage County, Oklahoma) with other Osages living across the United States.

== P ==
- Pacific Islander Americans aka Pasifikas – largest concentrations who tend to be Native Hawaiians and Samoans are in the states of Hawaii and California, USA. Included are Indo-Fijians of Indian/South Asian descent from the island country of Fiji.
- Pakistani Diaspora – People who are originally from Pakistan and have settled abroad. Are mainly economic migrants and settled mainly in the Middle East and Britain. The total population is approximately 7 million.

Map of the Pakistani Diaspora in the World

- Palestinian Diaspora – People who originally came from Palestine the majority of whom are made up of refugees from the 1948 Arab–Israeli War and the 1967 Six-Day War. It is estimated that more than 6 million Palestinians live in the global diaspora.

Map of the Palestinian Diaspora in the World

- Papua New Guinean diaspora - People who originally came from Papua New Guinea and are now based in other countries overseas like Australia, New Zealand, Canada and the United States of America.
- Pashtun diaspora – People who can trace their paternal lineage to East Iranic speaking tribes that stem from a legendary figure named Qais Abdur Rashid. Pashtuns are defined by their tribal genealogies, Pakhto dialects and the practice of Pashtunwali. Many South Asian Muslim communities are Pashtuns that have assimilated into south Asian culture and will carry Pashtun lineage or ancestry. Pakhtun homeland is southern Afghanistan, historically called Arachosia by ancient Macedonians. Historically Afghan was an exonym for Pashtun people however this is an ongoing controversy.
- Pattanian Diaspora or Malay Pattani – Pattania homeland is Southern Thailand border to Northern Malaysia. Under colonisation of Thailand from 1876 until today.
- Persian Diaspora – (See Iranian diaspora) a.k.a. Iranians are a major community in Los Angeles, and California in the US, as the major number of Persians in Los Angeles are located in the community of Westwood, Los Angeles a.k.a. Little Persia, and even the mayor of the nearby city of Beverly Hills is Persian (see Iranian Americans). Other large Iranian communities exist throughout the U.S., Canada, Europe, the Middle East, east Asia and Australia, make up a total of 10 million belonged to the Persian/Iranian diaspora, the majority are political refugees who fled the overthrow of the Mohammad Reza Pahlavi regime in 1978 and Islamic Revolution of 1979. Persians can also refer to Tajiks of Afghanistan and Tajikistan that are defined by speaking the archaic "dari" Persian dialect. Many have Pashtun and other east-iranic admixture, as well as the Aimaq and Hazara communities of mixed Mongolic and Turkic ancestry that speak Persian.
- Peruvian diaspora – People who originally came from Peru. The largest Peruvian communities are in the United States (see Peruvian Americans), Canada, Argentine, Chile, Venezuela, Europe (i.e. Spain, Italy and France), Japan and Australia.

Map of the Peruvian Diaspora in the World

- Pilipino diaspora (see Filipino diaspora).
- "Polonia" – the diaspora of the Poles started with the emigrations after the partitions of Poland, January Uprising and the November Uprising, enlarged by the Nazi policies, and later by the establishment of the Curzon line. Historic Poland extended into nearby countries: Belarus, Czech Republic, Estonia, Latvia, Lithuania, Russia, Slovakia and Ukraine. For over 600 years, large waves of Polish Émigrés, refugees and guest workers moved across Europe, established themselves in Austria, Belgium, Croatia, Denmark, France, Germany, Greece, Italy, Luxembourg, the Netherlands, Serbia, Spain, Sweden, Switzerland and the UK. 19th- and 20th-century Polish immigration extended into the United States, Canada, Brazil, Argentina, Mexico, Venezuela, Israel and Australia, as well across the former USSR. After Poland joined the É.U. in 2004, about a million Poles went to find work in the E.U. member states, the largest destinations were the UK, Ireland, the Netherlands, France, Spain and Portugal. See also Polish Americans for the 9 million of Polish descent in the US, as well as Polish Brazilian for the 3.5 million Brazilians of Polish descent.

Map of the Polish Diaspora in the World

- The Portuguese diaspora – main countries were the Portuguese live are in Europe: Portugal, Spain, France, Belgium, Germany, Luxembourg, Switzerland, Andorra and the UK. Former Portuguese African and Asian colonies (Angola, Cape Verde, Guinea-Bissau, India, Macau, Mozambique, São Tomé and Príncipe, Sri Lanka and Timor-Leste). Portuguese settled the country of Brazil in South America, but Portuguese colonies and communities in the western hemisphere: Argentina, Canada, the Caribbean islands, Chile, Guyana, Hawaii, Mexico, Panama, Peru, Suriname, Uruguay and Venezuela are well noted. See also Portuguese Americans for the diaspora in the United States.

Map of the Portuguese Diaspora in the World

- Puerto Rican diaspora – a mass migration of Puerto Ricans from the island territory of Puerto Rico to the United States mainland began during the first half of the 20th century and has become a subject often studied in colleges, because of Puerto Ricans who achieved success in the United States. The largest Puerto Rican communities in the mainland U.S. are in New York City (about 1 to 2 million in the New York City metro area), New Jersey, Pennsylvania and Florida, but other Puerto Ricans live in all 50 states including Hawaii, and also a smaller community each in Canada, England and Spain in Europe. Some Puerto Ricans from New York call themselves Nuyoricans. Puerto Ricans everywhere commonly refer to themselves as Boricuas, referring to Borinquen, or Puerto Rico's name given by the Taínos before the arrival of the Spanish.

== Q ==
- Quebec diaspora or Québécois diaspora; the French name for French-speaking Canadian residing in the province of Quebec. See also French-Canadian diaspora. Quebec is the only non-English speaking majority region of Anglo-America.

== R ==
- Rhodesian diaspora. Southern Rhodesia had the distinction amongst Britain's African colonies of being a self-governing Crown Colony. As a result, most Southern Rhodesians did not regard Great Britain as home but instead regarded Southern Rhodesia as home, though they did recognise cultural ties to Great Britain. During and following the Bush War (1966–1979, during which period the former Southern Rhodesia was known as Rhodesia) more than half of Rhodesia's population of European descent emigrated mainly to Australia, New Zealand and Canada. For many South Africa was the first destination, where some have settled, but most of these migrants where transient and later reached further destinations. Others recognising their cultural ties to Great Britain emigrated there. This trend continued after Rhodesia became Zimbabwe-Rhodesia in June 1979 and increased when Zimbabwe-Rhodesia became Zimbabwe in March 1980 (following a brief 85-day period during which the land's name formally reverted to "Southern Rhodesia" for reasons of political expediency); it is estimated that the population of European descent decreased from a peak 275,000 in 1970, to 120,000 in 1999. British citizens resident in the region joined in this migration and did not in all cases return to Great Britain, or in some cases did so only temporarily before moving on. Northern Rhodesians of European descent also emigrated to these same destinations, though their migration began earlier when Northern Rhodesia became Zambia in 1964 and was not the result of war but economic pressure. People of European descent also emigrated from Nyasaland after 1964 and followed the same routes as Northern Rhodesians, for the same reason. See: Federation of Rhodesia and Nyasaland.
- Romani Diaspora – originating in the Punjab region of India, the Romani people began a mass migration to Europe c. 1000. Romani also live in other continents around the world, including the United States. AKA "Gypsies", other names for them are Rom, Roma, Romany, Romanichol and somewhat related or ethnically distinct groups like Ashkali or Balkan Egyptians, Cagots, Cigans/Zigans, Gitans/Gitanos, Kale, Manouches, Quinquins, Shelta, Sinti, Tattares/Taters, and Yeni/Yenish.

Map of the Romani Diaspora in the World

- Romanians – who emigrated for the first time in larger figures between 1910 and 1925, and left in mass after the fall of communist regime in Romania in 1989, and comprise the Romanian diaspora, are found today in large numbers in Italy, Spain, Portugal, France, Germany, Greece, Israel, Russia, Turkey, Belgium, the U.K., Ireland, China, Japan, Australia, the U.S., Canada, Mexico, Brazil, Venezuela and Argentina. Today there are over 10 mil. people of Romanian descent outside the country.

Map of the Romanian Diaspora in the World

- The Russian diaspora – The earliest significant wave of ethnic Russian emigration took place in the wake of the Old Believer schism in the 17th century. A sizable "wave" of ethnic Russians emigrated during a short time period in the wake of the October Revolution and Russian Civil War, known collectively as the White emigres. A smaller group of Russians (often referred to by Russians as the second emigration or second wave) had also left during World War II, many were refugees or eastern workers. During the Soviet period, ethnic Russians migrated throughout the area of former Russian Empire and Soviet Union, and after the collapse of the Soviet Union found themselves living outside Russia.
  - White Russian diaspora – named for the Russians and Belarusians who left Russia (the USSR 1918–91) in the wake of the 1917 October Revolution and Russian Civil War, seeking to preserve pre-Soviet Russian culture, the Orthodox Christian faith, and includes exiled former Communist party members, such as Leon Trotsky found exile in Mexico but was assassinated in 1940. The millions of Russian émigré and refugees found live in North America (the U.S. and Canada), Latin America with a sect of Pryguny or Molokans settled in Guadalupe Valley, Baja California in Mexico, even more went to Europe (The UK, Austria, Belgium, former Czechoslovakia, France, Germany, Greece, Hungary, Italy, the Netherlands, Poland, Scandinavia, Switzerland and former Yugoslavia), some to east Asia (China and Japan), south Asia (India and Iran) and the Middle East (Egypt and Turkey).

Map of the Russian Diaspora in the World

- Ryukyuan people – Also known as Okinawans, an Asian people closely related to the Japanese in terms of culture and language, from the Ryukyu Islands, politically part of Japan since 1879. Thousands emigrated to Japan, Hawaii, and various Pacific islands after the Japanese annexation to form the initial Ryukyuan diaspora. After World War II, the U.S. controlled the Ryukyu Islands from 1945 until their return to Japanese rule in 1972. Since then, tens of thousands of Okinawans settled in the U.S. and in the 1960s, there massive settlement programs of Okinawan farmers into Latin America, the majority in Brazil and Peru, and some Ryukyuan transplants in Ecuador, Bolivia (the Santa Cruz, Bolivia province area) and Paraguay (i.e. the Gran Chaco) to develop their countries' agricultural farmlands.

== S ==
- Salvadorans from El Salvador, large refugee and immigrant communities in the Americas, esp. the USA. Salvadorans formed communities during the civil wars (1980s-90s), escaping drug cartel violence (2000s-10s) and for economic reasons (since the 1970s onward) in Los Angeles; Miami, Florida; New Orleans, Louisiana; San Francisco Bay; and the Washington, D.C. areas. (see Salvadoran diaspora in Los Angeles). Many Salvadorans also settled in Mexico and Canada.
- Scottish diaspora – includes the Auld Alliance and the Scottish Wars of Independence which led countless Scots to emigrate to mainland Europe to escape persecution and hardship. The Highland clearances which depopulated large parts of the Scottish Highlands and had lasting effects on Scottish Gaelic culture; the Lowland Clearances which resulted in significant migration of Lowland Scots to Canada (highest concentration in the province Nova Scotia) and the United States after 1776; the Ulster-Scots, descended primarily from Lowland Scots who settled Ulster during the Plantation of Ulster in the 17th century and subsequently fled to the Americas in mass numbers throughout the 18th century due to religious and cultural persecution as well as other socio-economic factors. Other Scots and Ulster Scots went to Australia, New Zealand, South Africa and a smaller but important community in Argentina. (See also British diaspora and Scots-Irish people).
- Serbian diaspora – from Serbia, former Yugoslavia. Over 12 million of Serbian descent live around the world, historically based in Serbia, nearby Montenegro, Kosovo (disputed by Serbia), Bosnia and Herzegovina, Croatia, Hungary, Albania, North Macedonia and Romania. The largest overseas Serbian communities are in the U.S. (see Serbian American), nearby Bulgaria and Slovenia in the Balkans of Europe, and further away in Switzerland and Germany. Other communities in Sweden, Norway, Austria, Australia, Canada, Poland, Portugal, Spain, Denmark, the United Kingdom, France, Italy, the Netherlands, Venezuela, Brazil and South Africa.

Map of the Serbian Diaspora in the World

- Seventh-day Adventists – similar to Mormons and Jehovah's Witnesses who believe in political neutrality, this Christian sect has 15 million members (nearly tied with LDS church and JWs) in the world. They form a majority of residents in only one town: Loma Linda, California, USA – where the church has offices, as well have a university, free hospital and TV network.
- Somali diaspora – includes ethnic Somalis who live in Djibouti, Ethiopia, Yemen, Kenya, as well other parts of Africa. It also includes about 2.5 million people of Somali origin who live in the Middle East, Europe, Oceania, and North America, either as recent immigrants or as naturalized citizens. Little Mogadishu in Minneapolis, USA is the largest Somali community in North America. Several Little Somalias formed in the US by refugees since the 1990s.
- South African diaspora – mainly consists of white South African emigrants of British and to a lesser extent, Afrikaner origin. A minority of British diaspora have moved to Great Britain (often through the UK ancestry visa), due to socioeconomic concerns such as South Africa's high crime rate in the 1990s, volatile South African Rand, economic mismanagement during the Jacob Zuma presidency and changes in the South African economy. Afrikaners and Black South Africans generally have much lower emigration rates than their English and Jewish counterparts. South Africans have largely settled in the UK, Australia, the United States, New Zealand, Canada, and to a lesser extent, Zimbabwe, Ireland, the UAE, France and Portugal. In the 2000s, Russia and nearby Georgia invited thousands of Afrikaner farmers.

Map of the South African Diaspora in the World

- South Asian diaspora – includes millions of people from India, Bangladesh, Sindh, Pakistan and Sri Lanka, whose descendants live in Suriname, South Africa, Trinidad and Tobago, Guyana, Jamaica, Kenya, Mauritius, Fiji, Singapore, Malaysia, Thailand, Tanzania, Uganda, and other countries who left British India in the 19th and early 20th centuries, and millions more who have moved to Australia, Canada, France, Germany, Italy, New Zealand, the Netherlands, Norway, Sweden, the United States, the United Kingdom and the United Arab Emirates in recent decades (see Desi, British Asian, South Asian American, Indo-Canadian and Parsees).
  - Indian diaspora – estimated at over 30 million, refers to people originating from India living in other parts of the world.
  - Pakistani diaspora – estimated at over 9 million, refers to people originating from Pakistan living in other parts of the world.
  - Bengali Hindu diaspora – the worldwide population of the Bengali Hindus of Indian and Bangladeshi origin.
  - Tamil diaspora – denotes people of Tamil Nadu and Sri Lankan Tamil origin who have settled in many parts of rest of India, Sri Lanka, Malaysia, Singapore, Reunion, South Africa, Mauritius, Fiji, Guyana, Trinidad and Tobago, French Caribbean islands, Europe, Australia and North America (US and Canada).
  - Sikh diaspora – from the Punjab region Sikhs have emigrated to all over the world. Now there are more than a million Sikhs outside of India. The biggest community is the British Sikh community which in the last census was recorded as 336,179 people. There are also major Sikh communities in Canada with 278,000, 150,000 living in Europe, Malaysia (100,000), East Africa (100,000), America (87,000), 50,000 in Asia outside India, and 32,000 in Australia and New Zealand.
  - Punjabi diaspora – main regions Punjabis have migrated to include: EU (chiefly UK), Canada, US, Malaysia and Australia, which took place in the 20th century.
  - Punjabi Mexican Americans – a duality of diasporas when the first Punjabi (Indian and Pakistani) immigrants intermarried with the Mexican American population of California, USA.
  - Sindhi diaspora – main regions Sindh, Sindhis have migrated to include: EU (chiefly UK), Canada, United States, Malaysia and Australia, which took place in the 20th century or before.
  - The Romani (English terms: Gypsy, Gypsies) – a traditionally 'dispersed' people in Europe, with origins in South Asia (or perhaps, northern India and Sindh) for 800-some years, are even more 'dispersed' today, following the Holocaust of Nazi Germany. (See Some names for the Roma) – one name for Roma in England are "Tinkers". Over 10 million Romani live across Europe, the majority in Spain, and then Eastern countries (Russia, Ukraine, Belarus, Latvia, Lithuania, Romania, Bulgaria, Hungary, Poland, Albania, Greece, Serbia, Slovakia, Slovenia, Croatia, Bosnia and Herzegovina, Montenegro and Macedonia), and estimates of 250,000 Romani are known to live in North America (the US and Canada).
- Spanish diaspora – Refers to the migration of millions Spanish people over the last 500 years all over the world, for a great variety of reasons, especially to the Americas, Africa (Spanish Guinea, Spanish Morocco, and the Canary Islands), and other Spanish territories in Europe. This has resulted in the diffusion of the Spanish language and the large number of Spanish names in the places mentioned. During the 20th century, the Spanish diaspora was increased due to the political and economic emigrants who left Spain during the Francoist dictatorship (1930s but his death in 1975 brought democratic reform back to Spain). Notable communities were established in Argentina, Venezuela, Cuba, Mexico, France, Italy, Russia, the United Kingdom and across Latin America.

Map of the Spanish Diaspora in the World

- Sri Lankan diaspora. The Sri Lankan diaspora are Sri Lankan emigrants from Sri Lanka, and their descendants and reside in a foreign country. They number a total estimated population of around 3 million.

Map of the Sri Lankan Diaspora in the World

- Sudanese from the African nation of Sudan and the new independent country of South Sudan inhabited by the mostly Christian Dinka and Nuer peoples. Many Sudanese of both countries immigrated into Europe, esp. the UK and scattered across the Middle East. There has been substantial growth of Sudanese in the US and Canada, esp. in the Midwest and Central States (see Sudanese American), and were areas of resettlement of tens of thousands of (many Southern) Sudanese refugee children known the Lost Boys of Sudan in the 1990s and 2000s (decade).
- Swedish diaspora. Large numbers of Swedes (and Swedish-speaking Finns from Finland also under Russian rule) migrated to the US in the late 19th and early 20th centuries. It is estimated that about eight million Americans have some Swedish ancestry. Swedish Americans constitute 10% of the population of Minnesota and other large numbers settled in Wisconsin, Illinois, New York and Pennsylvania. A large colony of Swedes settled towns in the US like Lindsborg, Kansas and Kingsburg, California in the late 19th century. Large Swedish migration took place in Canada in the same time period along with other ethnic Scandinavians from Norway, Denmark and Iceland. Smaller waves of Swedish expatriates live across Europe, east Asia, Australia and Latin America, usually made up of retirees and businessmen in the late 20th century. It is estimated that between 80,000 and 100,000 Swedes live in Norway (2012), many of whom being young workers.

Map of the Swedish Diaspora in the World

- Swiss diaspora, some 9% of Swiss citizens live across the globe. Swiss nationals and descendants live in the U.S., Canada, Mexico, Peru, Bolivia, Argentina, Brazil and nearby nations of France, Germany, Italy and Austria. In the late 19th century, an immigration settlement program brought tens of thousands of Swiss Germans, ethnic Germans and Austrians alike into southern Chile, and the imprint of Germanic culture remains strong there. Also to note West African nations such as Liberia and Ghana are known for several thousands of Swiss expatriates.

Map of the Swiss Diaspora in the World

- Syrian diaspora – The largest Arab nationality diaspora in the world.

Map of the Syrian Diaspora in the World

== T ==
- Tamil diaspora – a demographic group of Tamil people of Indian or Sri Lankan origin who have settled in other parts of the world.
- Tibetan diaspora – a group of Tibetan people who left Tibet to be with the 14th Dalai Lama after he went into exile in 1959. Most live in India and Nepal, but some live in the United States and Europe. An estimated 20–40,000 Tibetans live in Switzerland alone, and Tibetans live throughout the world. Large Tibetan communities exist in California (US) esp. in New York City, Los Angeles and San Francisco. The Tibetans in exile were influential in the Free Tibet movement which has many American activists, including celebrities and converts to Buddhism.
- Turkish diaspora – refers to the Turkish people living outside of Turkey (most notably in Germany).

Map of the Turkish Diaspora in the World

== U ==
- Ukrainian diaspora, represented by Ukrainians who left their homeland in several waves of emigration, settling mainly in the Americas (United States, Canada, Mexico, Brazil and Argentina), but also Australia, east Asia (China) and across Europe. Also includes the tens and millions of Ukrainians who migrated from Ukraine to other parts of the former Soviet Union (mainly Russia and the Baltics) during the Soviet time. Ukrainians in the Middle East should be noted and the large-scale Ukrainian with Russian Jewish emigration to Israel.
  Map of the Ukrainian Diaspora in the world
  - Ruthenians and Carpathians, self-titles for Slavic peoples from the small region of Ruthenia, encompasses easternmost Slovakia, southeast parts of Poland, northern edges of Hungary and westernmost Ukraine, had preserved a unique ethnocultural identity, but lacked an independent country of their own for almost a millennium. In the late 19th century and again between World Wars I and II, over a million Ruthenians fled their homeland and settled across Western Europe (France, Germany and Austria), North America (the U.S. and Canada) and the USSR (Russia), but lesser numbers settled in East Asia (China), the Middle East (Turkey), South America (Brazil) and Australia in the late 20th century.
- Uganda Diaspora refers to about 1.5 million Ugandans (according to the UN Human Development Report of 2009) who left Uganda from the early 1970s—during the dictatorship reign of Idi Amin (to escape persecution and death)--to the current time "in [their] search for better social and economic opportunities." The Ugandans who left are diverse, knowledgeable, talented and have raised families overseas with some now identifying as mixed race. Many have settled in Europe, Asia and North America. Studies show that Ugandans in the diaspora have contributed vast revenue to the Ugandan economy through investments and remittances they send back to their families in Uganda. In 2016, over US$1.2 billion was introduced into the Uganda's economy; in 2017, about US$1.4 billion was introduced into Uganda's coffers, and in 2018—US$1.3 billion was injected into the economy.

== V ==
- The Venezuelan diaspora – People from Venezuela who live outside of their territory: Mainly in the United States, Mexico, Spain, Italy, Panama, Trinidad and Tobago and most of South America. Most of them arrived to escape from the military dictatorship of the 1950s and the political repressions in the 1960s. There is also a growing number of Venezuelans in Canada almost all of them working for the Oil industry after the 2002 strike. See also Venezuelan American. Since the arrival of President Hugo Chávez, a significant growing number of young Venezuelans are fleeing their country in search of better living standards and work opportunities. More recently, since the crisis worsening in 2012, another wave of Venezuelans have emigrated, including people from all age groups and socioeconomic statuses.

Map of the Venezuelan Diaspora in the World

- Vietnamese diaspora - See Vietnamese boat people

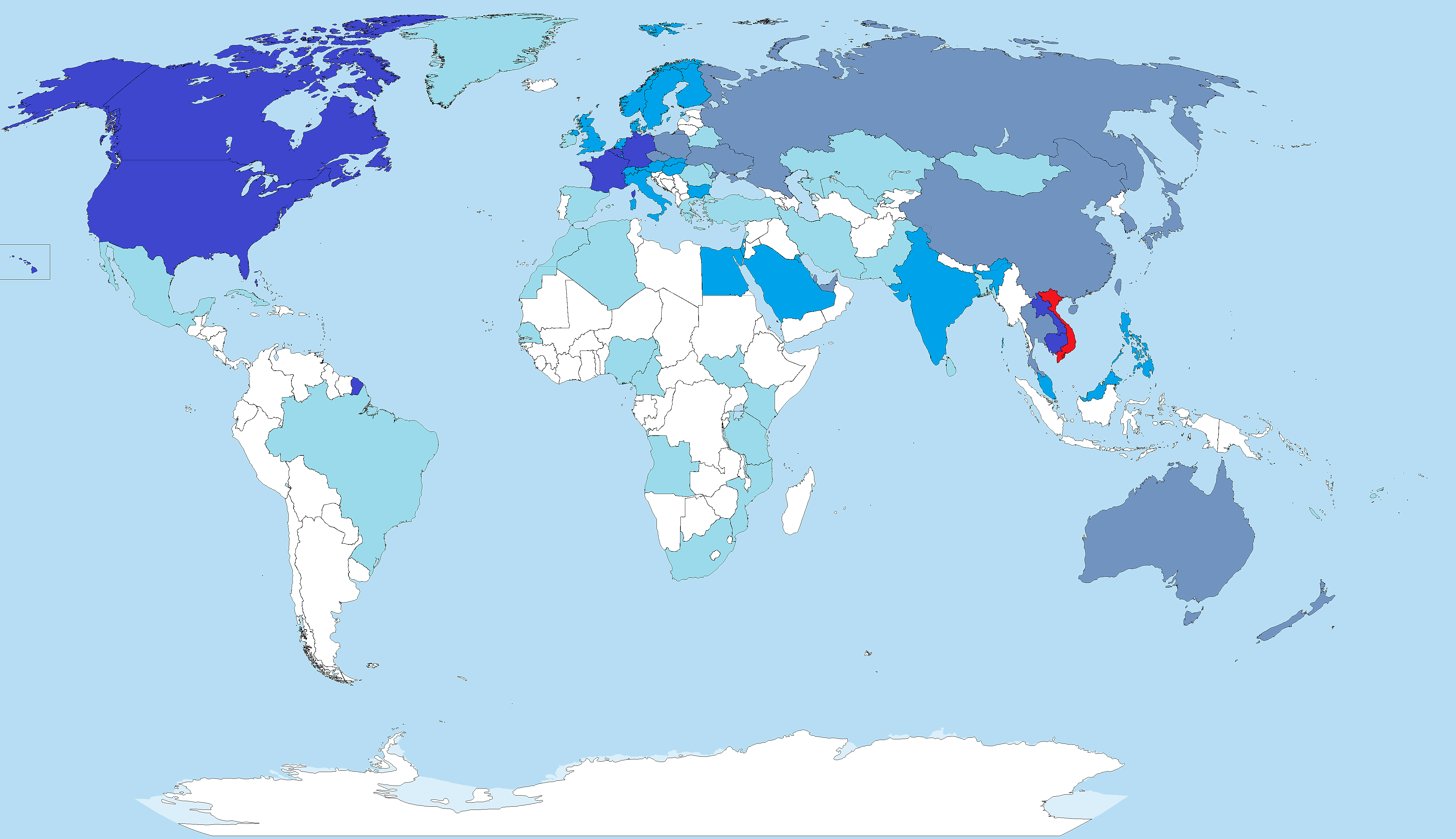
Map of the Vietnamese Diaspora in the World

== W ==
- Welsh diaspora – The Welsh (or in the Welsh language – Cymry) are a Celtic people from Wales one of the four countries of the United Kingdom who manage to preserve their Celtic heritage after a millennium of English and then British rule. An estimated 5 million people of Welsh ancestry live globally in areas formerly part of the British Empire (Canada, Australia, New Zealand and lesser numbers in Latin America) and about 2 million Americans are of Welsh descent. In the 19th century, over 500,000 Welsh miners migrated out of Wales throughout the British Empire, western Europe, the Americas (the U.S. such as Jackson County, Ohio was nicknamed Little Wales) and South Africa for mining jobs, but others came as shepherds, factory workers and fishermen. The Welsh fought hard to preserve their culture, such as the revived Welsh language and their sense of identity in face of forced assimilation to the Anglo-British fabric. In the late 19th century, a small but solid group of Welsh people settled in Patagonia, creating the Welsh community known as Y Wladfa that survived to this day in the Argentine provinces of Chubut and Santa Cruz. Many there are bilingual in Spanish and Welsh.
- Western Sahara the people on the exile of Mali, France, Spain, Algeria (mainly Tinduf), Mauritania, Niger, Italy and Senegal. And on the Free Zone of the Saharaui Republic.
- West Philadelphia was a recent scene of the Urban Indian culture, especially of the Lenni-Lenape or Delaware Indian tribe. Their community of University City, Philadelphia is called "Lenapehoking" for the indigenous name for the region. Also the Iroquois Confederacy formed communities there and in Boston, New York City, Washington, D.C. and Cleveland by the BIA relocation program during the mid-20th century. Although minuscule in number, many of them (their moniker the "Mohawks") arrived as skyscraper construction workers.

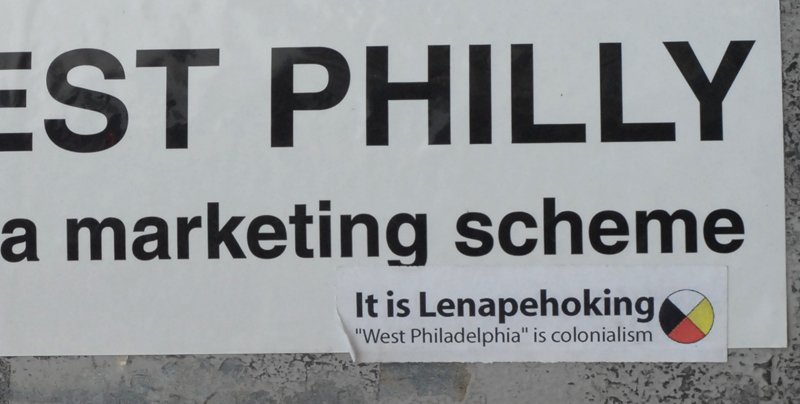
Sticker from the American Indian activist community of West Philadelphia in Philadelphia PA US.

== X ==
- "Xin (New) Uygurs", a Turkic ethnic group of the Northwestern region of Xinjiang in China. Over 2 million Uygurs migrated outward, to autochthonous Uygur tribal areas in nearby countries of Kazakhstan, Kyrgyzstan, Tajikistan, Turkmenistan, Uzbekistan and elsewhere in the former USSR (Russia). Other Uygurs long settled across China, but also are in Pakistan, the U.A.E, throughout Europe (the EU) and 200,000 live in the United States, the main communities of Uygurs in San Francisco and Los Angeles.

== Y ==
- Yemenis from the country of Yemen in the Arabian peninsula. Historically Yemen was one kingdom until Ottoman Turks and then British colonialism in the late 19th century. The British maintained the former country of South Yemen until its independence (1967–90) and was the only Marxist government in the Middle East before unification with North Yemen. Yemeni immigration in the 20th and early 21st century have dispersed the population throughout the Middle East (esp. Bahrain, Qatar, Saudi Arabia and the UAE), guest workers in Europe (see Yemeni British), Australia and East Asia. Yemenis have been arriving in the United States (see Yemeni American) with a large concentration in Lackawanna, New York near Buffalo and also in Detroit, while large numbers of Yemenis also live in adjacent Canada.

Map of the Yemeni Diaspora in the World

- Yugoslavs (see Bosnians, Croats, Macedonians, Montenegrins, Serbs and Slovenes). From 1918 to 1990, the country of Yugoslavia in southeastern Europe existed (until 2006, when the nation renamed to Serbia and Montenegro broke apart). Millions of former Yugoslavs moved across Europe (laborers encouraged by the Yugoslavian government in the 1950s-80s to relocate), emigrated to North America (especially the United States) and around the world (Chile may have the largest pre-1990 Yugoslavian communities in ratio of its population).

== Z ==
- Zimbabwean diaspora – Zimbabwean people who live outside Zimbabwe; many have emigrated to South Africa, the United Kingdom, Australia, Canada and the United States. Most white Zimbabweans left the country after independence in 1980. Black Zimbabweans began leaving the country in significant numbers in the 1990s. Today, there are millions of Zimbabweans living and working abroad.
- Zoroastrian diaspora – two waves; the first took place in the 7th century when the Arabs conquered Persia and those who fled to India became known as the Parsees. In addition, after the Iranian Revolution of 1979, several thousand of the remaining Zoroastrians in Iran fled to the United States and the European Union, the largest diaspora being in Great Britain.

== Various ==
- Various Native Americans of the United States have diaspora legends, stories and identity, but this applies only after contact with Europeans and removal of entire tribal peoples by post-colonial white European governments from the 16th to 19th centuries.
- Various ethnic minorities from areas under Russian and Soviet control following the Russian Revolution, continuing through the mass forced resettlements under Joseph Stalin.
- Various groups fled in large numbers from areas under Axis control during World War II, or after the border changes following the war, and formed their own diasporas. Only a few larger sized ethnic groups and nationalities were able to restore autonomy after the fall of Communism and the disbanding of the Soviet Union (1990–91).
