= Corsican Americans =

Americans of Corsican birth or descent

Americani corsi (Corsican) Américains corses (French) Americani corsi (Italian)

Total population
- 1,840

Languages
- English, Corsican, French, Italian

Religion
- Catholicism

Related ethnic groups
- Corsican-Puerto Ricans, French Americans, Italian Americans, Sicilian Americans, Maltese Americans, Catalan Americans, Gibraltarians

Corsican Americans (Corsican: Americani corsi) are Americans of full or partial Corsican descent.

== Notable people ==
- René Auberjonois
- John Bernard
- Charles J. Bonaparte
- Cipriano Ferrandini
- Tania Raymonde
- Reni Santoni
