= Sicilian Americans =

Americans of Sicilian birth or descent

Siculo-americani (Italian) Sìculu-miricani (Sicilian)
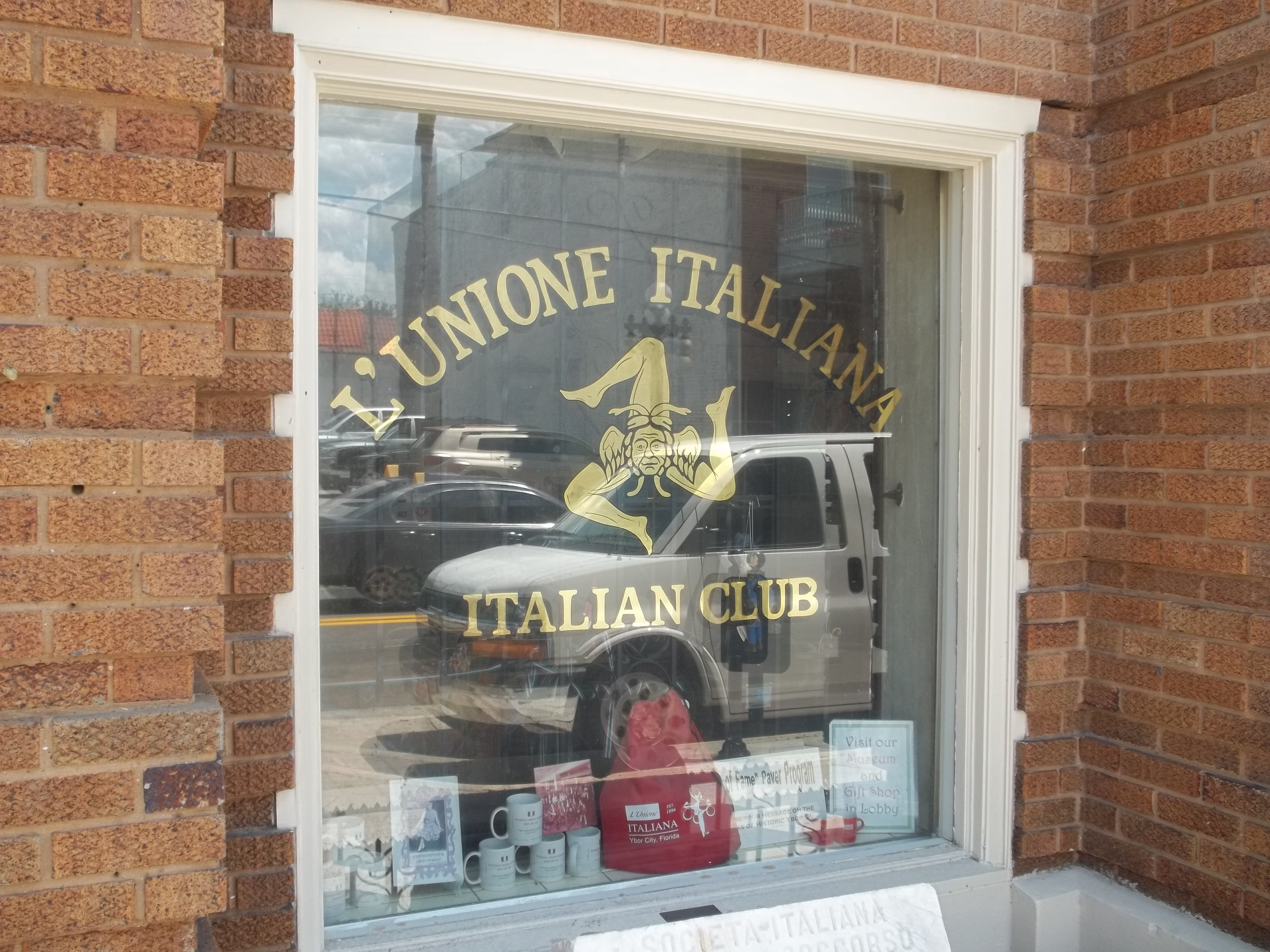
- The Sicilian triskelion in Ybor City, a district of Tampa, Florida, home to many Sicilian Americans

Total population
- 68,290 (alone) or 85,175 (incl. combination) (2000)

Regions with significant populations
- Middletown (CT), New York City, New Haven, Buffalo, Rochester, Cleveland, Erie, Tampa, Miami, Pittsburgh, Chicago, Boston, Scranton, Pittston (PA), Dunmore (PA), Easton (PA), Johnston (RI), Detroit, Philadelphia, Los Angeles, San Francisco, New Orleans, Milwaukee, St. Louis, Seattle

Languages
- American English • Siculish • Italian • Sicilian

Religion
- Predominantly Roman Catholic

Related ethnic groups
- Sicilians • Italians • Arbëreshë • Maltese Americans • Corsican Americans • Southern Italians

Sicilian Americans (Italian: siculo-americani; Sicilian: sìculu-miricani) are Italian Americans who are fully or partially of Sicilian descent, whose ancestors were Sicilians who immigrated to United States during the Italian diaspora, or Sicilian-born people in U.S. They are a large ethnic group in the United States.

The first Sicilians who came to the territory that is now the United States were explorers and missionaries in the 17th century under the Spanish crown. Sicilian immigration to the United States then increased significantly starting from the late 1800s to the early 1900s. Direct connections by sea departed from the ports of Palermo and Castellammare del Golfo.

Since emigration from Sicily began in the United States before Italian unification, and reached its peak at a time when regional differences were still very strong and marked, many Sicilian immigrants identified (and still identify), both linguistically and ethnically, primarily on a regional rather than a national basis. Today, there are many studies also dedicated to the history of Sicilian Americans.

== History ==
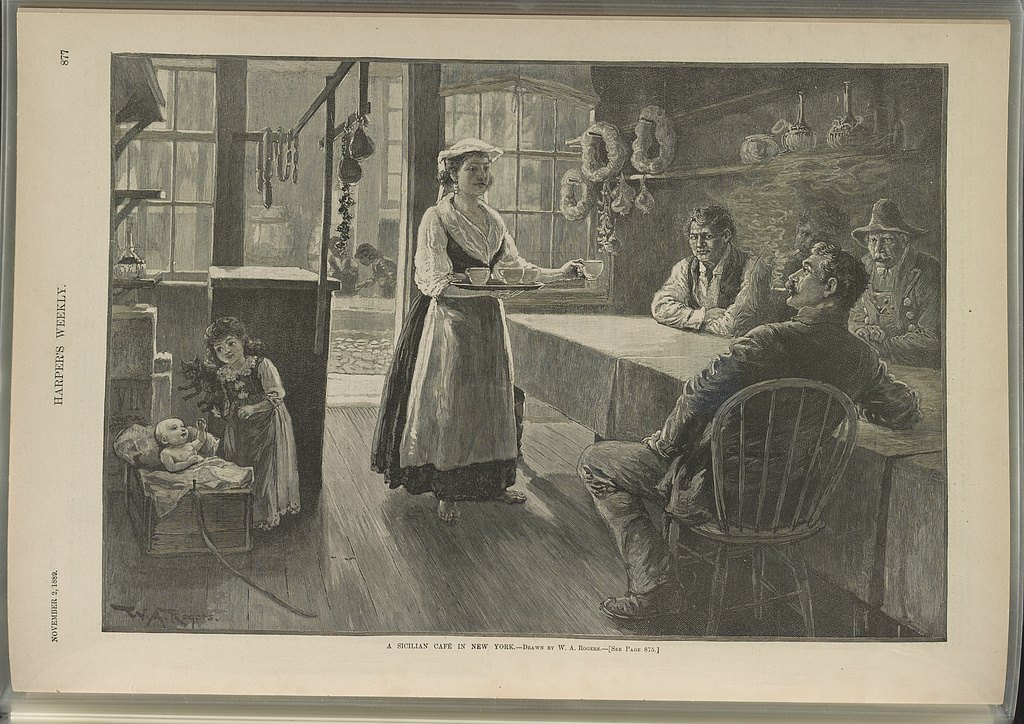
A Sicilian café in New York, 1889.

Sicilian immigration to the United States grew substantially starting in the 1880s to 1914, when it was cut off by World War I. Many Sicilians planned to return home after a few years making money in the United States, but the wartime delay allowed many to assimilate into better jobs and wartime experience, so they did not return.

Sicilian Bakery in New York City, 1943.

By 1924, about 4,000,000 Italians immigrated to the US. The Emergency Quota Act, and the subsequent Immigration Act of 1924 sharply reduced immigration from Southern Europe except for relatives of immigrants already in the U.S. This period saw political and economic shifts in Sicily that made emigration desirable. There was also a large wave of immigration after World War II. A great portion of the Sicilian immigrants would settle in Middletown, New York City, New Jersey, New Haven, Buffalo, Rochester, Erie, Tampa, Pittsburgh, Chicago, Boston, Pittston, Johnston, Rhode Island, Detroit, Philadelphia, Los Angeles, San Francisco, New Orleans, Milwaukee, and Birmingham.

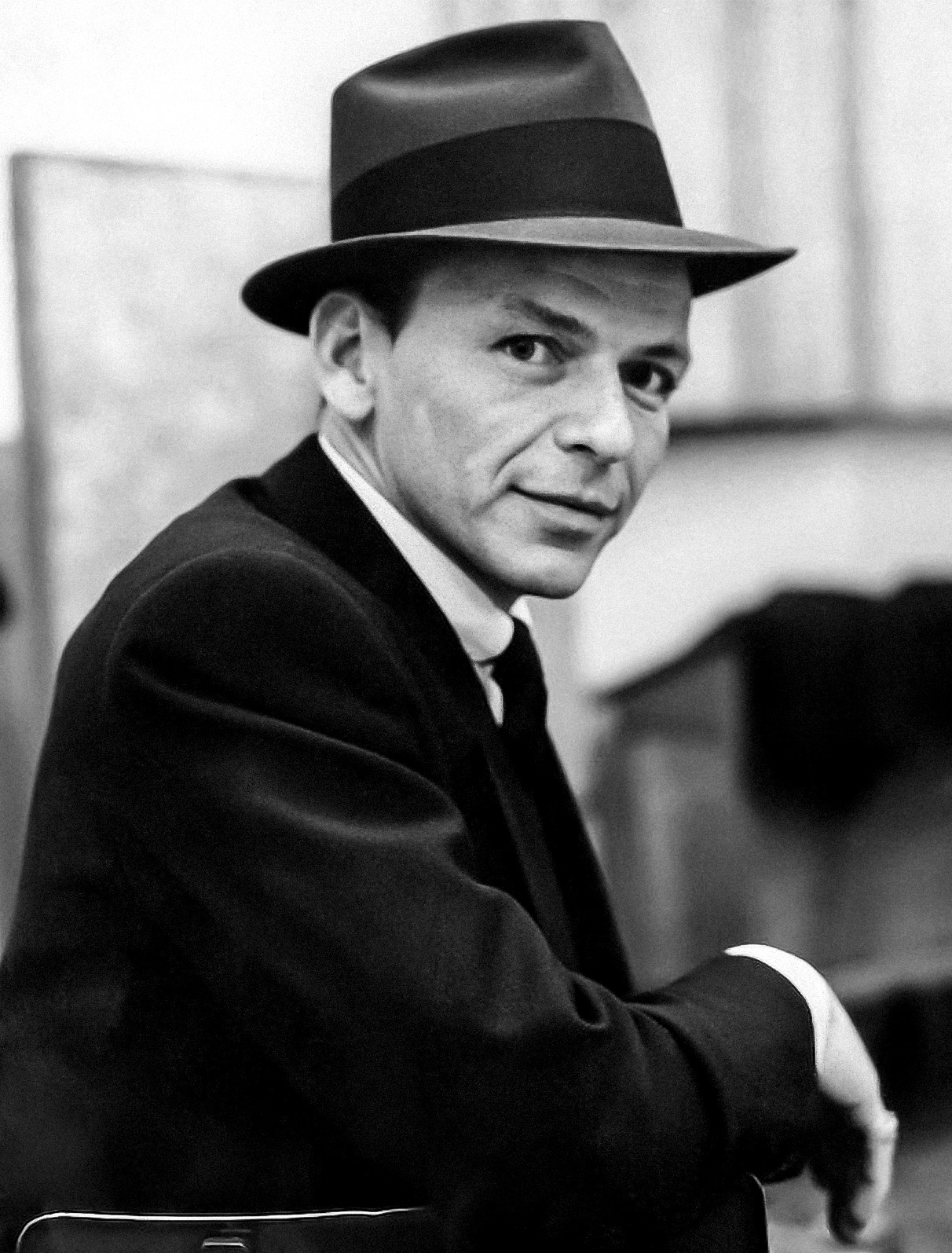
Frank Sinatra. He was born in Hoboken, New Jersey, as the only child of a Sicilian fireman father, Anthony Martin Sinatra (1894–1969). Anthony had emigrated to the United States in 1903 from Lercara Friddi, near Palermo.

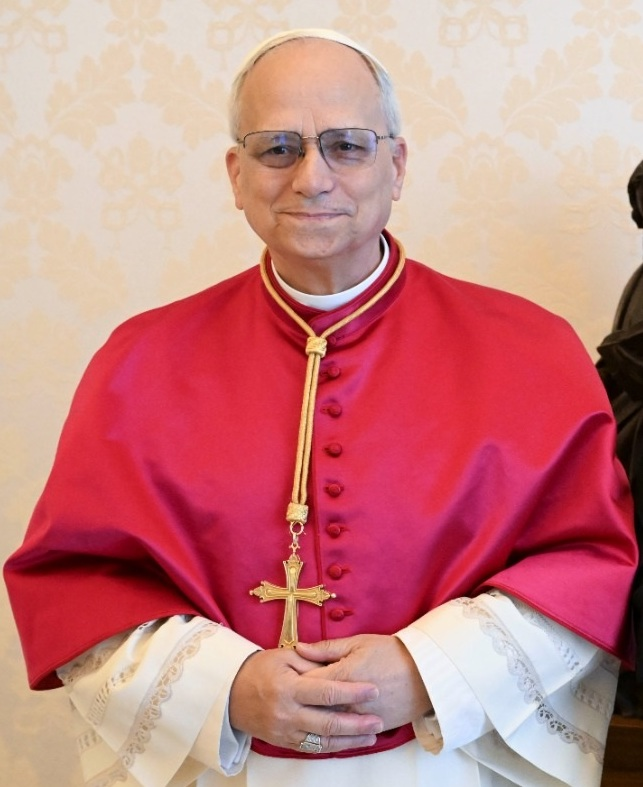
Pope Leo XIV. His paternal grandfather's family name was Riggitano, and later changed to Prevost, when he was settled in the United States. Leo XIV's paternal grandparents were John Riggitano Prevost (born Salvatore Giovanni Gaetano Riggitano, changed by him in the United States; 1876–1960), a Sicilian immigrant from Milazzo near Messina, Sicily region;

== Culture ==
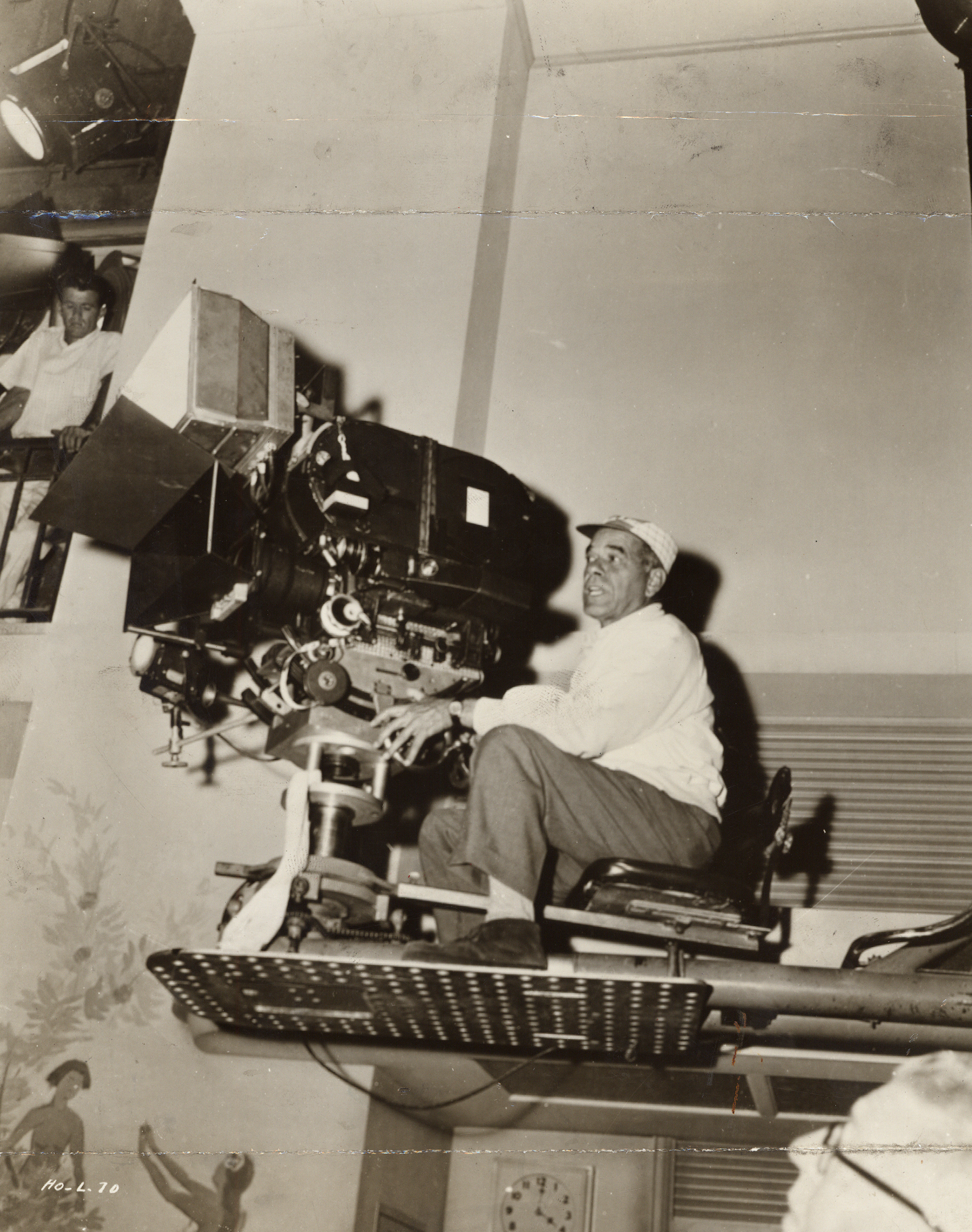
Film director Frank Capra, a native of Bisacquino, Sicily

Sicilian immigrants brought with them their own unique culture, including theatre and music. Giovanni De Rosalia was a noted Sicilian American playwright in the early period and farce was popular in several Sicilian dominated theatres. In music Sicilian Americans would be linked, to some extent, to jazz. Three of the more popular cities for Sicilian immigrants were New York City (especially Brooklyn), New Orleans and Chicago. The latter two cities were pivotal in the history of jazz. In New York City, the predominantly Sicilian neighborhoods prior to World War II were East Harlem and Elizabeth Street in Harlem and Little Italy, respectively, in Manhattan, Bushwick, Carroll Gardens and East Williamsburg in Brooklyn, and the predominantly Sicilian neighborhoods after World War II were Bensonhurst, Dyker Heights, and Gravesend, all in Brooklyn; in Chicago, "Little Sicily" was predominantly Sicilian, and in New Orleans, "Little Palermo", the lower French Quarter, was mostly Sicilian. One of the earliest, and among the most controversial, figures in jazz was Nick LaRocca, who was of Sicilian heritage. Modern Sicilian-American jazz artists include Bobby Militello and Chuck Mangione.

In 1892 Mother Cabrini arrived in New Orleans and opened an orphanage which became Cabrini High School in 1959.

The Sicilian-American respect for San Giuseppe (Saint Joseph) is reflected in the celebration of the Feast of Saint Joseph, primarily in New Orleans and Buffalo, every March 19. Many families in those cities prepare a "Saint Joseph's Day table", at which relatives or neighbors portray Jesus, Joseph and Mary and oversee the serving of meat-free Lenten meals to the poor of the community. The tables are the vestiges of a Sicilian legend which states that farmers prayed to St. Joseph, promising that if he interceded in a drought, they would share their bounty with the poor. The foods served at such tables include: Pasta con le sarde (spaghetti with sardines); lenticchie (lentils); and various froscie (omelettes) made with cardoon (wild artichoke), cicoria (dandelion) and other homely vegetables. Desserts include sfingi, zeppoli, a light puff pastry; sfogliatelle, pignolati, struffoli (honey balls); and cannoli, a Sicilian creation. One tradition has each guest at a St. Joseph's Day table receiving a slice of orange, a bit of fennel and a fava bean, for good luck.

== See also ==
- Immigration to the United States
- Italian Americans
- Italian diaspora
- List of Italian Americans
