= Gozitan dialects =

Dialect of Maltese

Gozitan
- Għawdxi
- Pronunciation: [/ˈaːw.t͡ʃɪ/]
- Native to: Malta
- Region: Gozo
- Native speakers: About 32,000
- Language family: Afro-Asiatic: Semitic; West Semitic; Central Semitic; Arabic; Maghrebi Arabic; Pre-Hilalian; Sicilian Arabic; Maltese; Gozitan
- Dialects: Għarb; Xewkija; Żebbuġ; Nadur; Għajnsielem
- Writing system: Latin (Maltese alphabet)

Language codes
- ISO 639-3: –
- Glottolog: gozo1238
- Linguasphere: 12-AAC-cag
- Gozo Island, Malta

The Gozitan dialects are rural dialects of Maltese spoken in the island of Gozo. The vowel shift of *ā (phonologically a) to o or u is their main differentiating trait.

== Vocabulary ==
Comparison of some words in Standard Maltese and in the Gozitan dialects:

English	Maltese	Gozitan
pills	pilloli	pinuri
shy	staħa	regħex
biscuit	biskuttel	fettul
mattress	saqqu	mitraħ
Gozo	Għawdex	Għawdix
dizzy	sturdament	mejt
bunch of	għanqud	xenxul
small table	tavolina	mejdina
internal hall door	antiporta	boxxla
to spoil someone	fsied	ħajm
silver foil	fidda	smontor
Yes	iva	ijwa
Beach	baħar	beħer

== See also ==
- Gozo
- Nadur Carnival
- Languages of Malta
