= Għarb dialect =

Dialect of Maltese spoken in Għarb, Gozo

- Region: Għarb, Gozo, Malta
- Language family: Afro-Asiatic: Semitic; West Semitic; Central Semitic; Arabic; Maghrebi Arabic; Pre-Hilalian; Sicilian Arabic; Maltese; Gozitan; Għarb dialect
- Writing system: Maltese alphabet

Language codes
- ISO 639-3: –
- Għarb in Malta

The Għarb dialect is a dialect of Maltese spoken in Għarb, on the island of Gozo, Malta. It is one of the Gozitan dialects. Its traditional pronunciation includes the retention of a historical consonant represented by għ, and pausal diphthongisation, in which vowel pronunciation changes before a pause.

== History and documentation ==
An early written record associated with the dialect is a letter dated 30 November 1838, published in The Harlequin on 6 December that year. Written by a correspondent identifying himself with Għarb, the letter used dialectal Maltese in the Latin alphabet before Maltese spelling was standardised. Joseph Galea's study of the letter describes its language as resembling the modern Għarb dialect, while noting differences attributable to subsequent linguistic change.

Maria Lipnicka's monograph The Dialect of Għarb (Gozo/Malta), published in 2025, provides a systematic description based on fieldwork conducted between 2013 and 2022 and comparative material from the 1970s. It examines the dialect's phonology, morphophonemics and morphology, including the relationship between pausal forms and prosody.

== Features ==
=== Consonants ===
Conservative Għarb speech preserves a historical consonant corresponding to some occurrences of written għ. Gilbert Puech records the survival of a postvelar [ɣ] among older speakers in Għarb and Qala, giving examples such as għalaq [ɣɑlɑʔ] ('he closed') and għalaqt [ɣlɒʔt] ('I closed').

The University of Malta's dialect project describes this pronunciation as resembling the French r, illustrating it with dgħajsa ('boat'), għana ('folk music') and xogħol ('work'). This historical għ sound is distinct from the retroflex r associated with western Gozitan speech. In a 2026 interview, Lipnicka reported that she had found the traditional għ pronunciation among older Għarb speakers but not younger generations, whereas the western Gozitan retroflex r remained in use among younger speakers.

=== Vowels and pausal forms ===
Pausal diphthongisation is a feature of Għarb and other Gozitan dialects. A word's vowels can have a different realisation immediately before a pause from their realisation within continuous speech. Lipnicka's comparative study describes diphthongisation in both open and closed final syllables, examining the influence of historical vowel length and consonantal emphasis on the resulting diphthongs. It also compares Gozitan pausal forms with those documented in the Arabic dialect of Zahlé, Lebanon.

== Use and vitality ==
Writing in 2020, sociolinguist Antoinette Camilleri Grima noted the absence of national statistics on Maltese dialect use and the omission of dialect questions from national censuses. Her 2018 survey involved 97 respondents from across Gozo, including six from Għarb. Across the sample, dialect use was widespread in communication with family members and other Gozitans, while Standard Maltese was commonly used with people from Malta. Camilleri Grima considered the outlook for Gozitan dialects broadly positive, emphasising their association with local identity and community relationships.

Lipnicka has distinguished the decline of particular traditional pronunciations from the broader survival of Gozitan dialects. In September 2026, she reported hearing children and young people using pausal forms during a visit to Gozo that June, and cautioned against interpreting the loss of individual features as the disappearance of the dialects themselves.

== Example ==
The University of Malta's dialect project provides recordings with orthophonic transcriptions, which adapt standard spelling to reflect pronunciation, and phonetic transcriptions.

Għarb	IPA transcription
It-tila ma tobrom xejn, punt wara punt, u din tobrom allura tiġi, tiġi turnetta jgħidulha, inkella mbagħad tal wara tista’ tgħallimha taħdim it-testa, dit-testa tkun, turnetta u mat-turnetta taħdim ċumbatur… fit-tarf. Ċumbatur tiġi, ċumbatur jiġi tahamżu fit-tarf fil-labra u jiġi testa, ngħidu aħna żgħar.	ɪtˈtiːlɐ mɐ ˈtʊbrʊm ʃɛjn pʊnt wɐrɐ pʊnt ʊ dɪn ˈtʊbrʊm ɐlˈluːrɐ ˈtɪʤɪ ˈtɪʤɪ tʊrˈnɛttɐ jɛˈduːlɐ ɪnˈkɛllɐ ˈɪmbɐːd tɐl ˈwɐrɐ ˈtɪstɐ tɐlˈlɪmɐ ˈtɐhdɪm ɪtˈtɛstɐ dɪtˈtɛstɐ tkuːn tʊrˈnɛttɐ ʊ mɐt tʊrˈnɛttɐ ˈtɐhdɪm ʧʊmbɐˈtuːr fɪt tɐrf ʧʊmbɐˈtuːr ˈtɪʤɪ ʧʊmbɐˈtuːr ˈjɪʤɪ tɐˈhɐmzʊ fɪt tɐrf fɪl ˈlɐbrɐ ʊ ˈjɪʤɪ ˈtɛstɐ ˈnɐjdʊ ˈɐhnɐ zɐːr
