= Maltese English =

Variety of English spoken in Malta

- Native to: Malta
- Ethnicity: Maltese
- Native speakers: 320,000 (2005)
- Language family: Indo-European: Germanic; West Germanic; Ingvaeonic; Anglo-Frisian; Anglic; English; British English; Maltese English
- Writing system: Latin (English alphabet); Unified English Braille

Official status
- Official language in: Malta

Language codes
- ISO 639-3: –
- Glottolog: malt1247
- IETF: en-MT

Maltese English (MaltE) is a postcolonial variety of the English language spoken by the Maltese people. Maltese English is heavily influenced by its contact with the Maltese language. It is close to the linguistically prestigious dialects of British English, but diverges from them in phonology and morphosyntax.

== Sociolinguistic information ==
Maltese English is an intermediate variety between ESL and EFL, undergoing nativisation. Overall, English in Malta can be divided into "foreign" varieties (e. g. Australian English) and the local dialect, which will be referred to as "Maltese English", but they exist as a continuum, with Received Pronunciation and the low-prestige local variety as its extrema. The mixed English-Maltese language is known as Maltenglish.

Although more than 100,000 Maltese immigrant English speakers live outside Malta, they often move to English-speaking countries and use the local variety of the language instead of Maltese English. Due to the technological advancements, many Maltese people regularly talk to their relatives living abroad.

While there is no law specifying a language of instruction in the educational setting, the National Minimum Curriculum requires the schools to pay sufficient attention to Maltese and English, as well as add at least one other language to the curriculum. English gradually replaces Maltese in the classroom as students move further in their education, but the choice of the language of instruction is largely defined by the language of the textbooks (most of them are in British English, but Maltese is used to teach Maltese language and History). Private schools provide much more instruction in English, with some forgoing Maltese entirely.

The command of English correlates with the prevalence of tertiary education, so among older people, Maltese English is generally spoken by the wealthier class, but younger Maltese have a higher university attendance rate, and are thus more proficient in English. It is estimated that more than 300,000 people speak Maltese English, which constitutes 88% of the population of Malta; it is acquired by young people without interruptions, so it is not endangered, unlike many other varieties of English. For most Maltese, English is their second language, even though it is acquired early in life; only 9% of the population report that they use English as a main language at home.

The wealthier strata of the Maltese society are often mocked for their "snobbery", which is represented by their choice of English over Maltese for communication, but also by their RP-like accent and avoidance of features typical for Maltese English. English remains the prestige language while Maltese is still stigmatised.

English is very prominent in the media: all advertisements and most magazines that target women are in English; the most popular books are English-language bestsellers. Television has more Italian and Maltese than English, but it is still prominent.

== History ==
Kachru's three circles of English

Malta was conquered by Arabs during the Arab–Byzantine wars in 870 and remained under their control until 1091 when Normans conquered Sicily and Malta. Europeans controlled Malta from that time on, with the British Empire ruling from 1814 until the declaration of its independence in 1964. Italian was brought to Malta by the Knights of St. John, who ruled over Malta in 1530−1798. It remained popular among the higher strata of the Maltese society, and so English was spreading across the population rather slowly. It became one of the two official languages of Malta in 1934 together with Italian, and only after that the Maltese people started learning it in large numbers.

Maltese English is not a settler variety: it formed because the native population needed to read English, but not to speak it, which is reflected in its features such as abundance of the spelling pronunciation. The main force affecting MaltE is Maltese, there is some Italian influence; it also acquired a lot from the "inner circle" dialects of English, mainly British and American English.

Maltese English is poorly documented. The first mention of "Maltese English" occurred in 1978. There is no grammar book, and while several bilingual MaltE-BrE dictionaries exist, there is no defining dictionary. Speakers have historically believed that Maltese English is the same as the prestigious dialect of the UK, but as of 2018, the local variety starts getting recognition as an identity marker for the Maltese people.

== Phonology ==
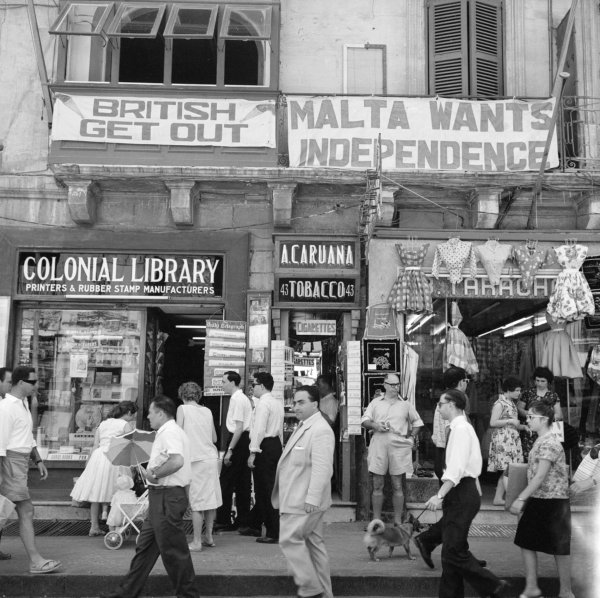
Shops with anti-British and pro-Independence signs in English. Valetta, Malta

Roberta Metsola, a Maltese politician, speaks a rhotic dialect but omits some of the r's

The phonology of Maltese English is usually described in relation to RP because it has always been the exonormative standard.

=== Consonants ===
Like many ESL varieties, Maltese English has a strong tendency towards devoicing the syllable coda and word-final obstruents: "lobster" is [lɒpstə] and "mug" is [mʌk]. It can be attributed to language contact, as Maltese also has this feature. On the other hand, in some words the /s/ that occurs between two sonorants or vowels undergoes voicing by analogy with Maltese and Italian cognates: "basically" is pronounced [ˈbeɪzɪkəli]. Another reason for this voicing is hypercorrection: "based" is often pronounced as [beɪzd].

Dark L (velarised /l/) is rare even in positions where it is expected in BrE: "hill" is [hɪɫ] in BrE, but [hɪl] in MaltE.

The tendency to use spelling pronunciation is exemplified by the pronunciation of the "ng" digraph as /ŋɡ/, akin to the dialects of the North of Britain. Words like "ringing" might be pronounced as [rɪŋgɪŋg]. This is most likely to happen at the end of a word if the next one starts with a vowel, or before a pause; it is rare before consonants while the word-final realisation of "ng" as /n/ occurs infrequently. This feature is more rare in words undergoing grammaticalisation, such as "going".

The common allophones of /r/ are a trill [r], an alveolar tap [ɾ], a retroflex approximant [ɻ] and a postalveolar approximant [ɹ]; they occur in near-free variation with a preference for approximants and a dispreference for trills, however, men have more trills while women strongly prefer approximants.

Maltese English can be characterised as a rhotic dialect, although /r/ is often omitted if it is not preceding a vowel. However, this is different in different social strata: in a study of L1 English speakers and Maltese-English bilinguals, the prevalence of omission of /r/ in a position before a vowel happens around 80% of the time, with an exception for contracted forms "you're", "we're" and "they're", where a rhotic form is used to avoid homonymy with non-rhotic "your", "were", "there" and "their". In contrast, a study of ESL English speakers had the exact opposite result with 80% of the /r/ being heard in non-prevocalic position.

The dental fricatives /θ/ and /ð/ usually appear as alveo-dental, but they are often perceived as alveolar [s] and [z] and sometimes realised as such with further tongue retraction. Th-stopping happens in the prestigious variety, but is rare; in the non-prestigious variety it is common, with a strongly aspirated [t].

=== Vowels ===
Due to the rich vocalic inventory of Maltese, full MaltE vowels are generally close to BrE ones.

Maltese has no schwa, and in Maltese English, it is usually realised as [ə~ɐ] in words like "comma" and as [ə~ɔ] in words like "support"; this quality is emphasised because of the tendency to not shorten vowels in reduced syllables. There is, however, a schwa insertion at the end of words ending with stops and affricates: "stop" [ˈstɔpʰə].

TRAP vowel (Note: See Lexical set) /æ/ is also not a part of the Maltese English sound system; it is replaced with [ɐ] or [ɛ].

Maltese /ɪ/ and /ʊ/ are more peripheral (less centralised) than the corresponding RP vowels, and their long counterparts are even more peripheral, tenser and less diphthongised than in RP.

Maltese English speakers usually insert an [ɪ] before /l/, /n/ and /m/ if these consonants often become syllabic in British English: BrE [ˈbɒtᵊɫ] - MaltE [ˈbɒtɪl]; the unstressed vowel that precedes these consonants often changes to [ɪ]: "bottom" [ˈbɒtɪm].

BATH and PALM vowels are both /a(ː)/, typically realised as [ɐ(ː)]; the /l/ is often pronounced, especially in lower-prestige varieties.

The FACE vowel /eɪ/ is realised as [ɛi] in Maltese and sometimes monophthongised to [ɛ(ː)] or [e(ː)].

The GOAT vowel is [ɔʊ] in MaltE ([əʊ] in RP) and can get smoothed to [o(ː)] or [ɔ(ː)].

Most other non-r-coloured vowels are very similar to RP:

- THOUGHT [ɔː],
- PRICE [ɐɪ], MOUTH [ɐʊ] and CHOICE [ɔɪ] ([aɪ], [aʊ] and [ɔɪ] in RP),
- HAPPY [i(ː)], never [ɪ],
- DRESS [e~ɛ̝],
- LOT [ɔ] ([ɒ] in RP),
- STRUT [ɐ], may be merged with TRAP, PALM, START or BATH.

==== R-coloured vowels ====
The BIRD, NURSE and FATHER vowels are realised as [ɛr] for rhotic speakers and as [ɜː] in the prestige variety. Rhotic prestige varieties have either an r-coloured schwa, or a short schwa and a /r/.

The NORTH and FORCE vowels have merged.

The START vowel is [ɐ~ɐː] for the speakers of the non-rhotic variant while the rhotic speakers add one of the allophones of /r/ at the end. The same is true for NORTH: [ɔ~ɔː] for non-rhotic and the same vowel with an /r/ for the rest.

The NEAR [ɪ(ə~ɐ)r], SQUARE [ɛ(ə~ɐ)r] and CURE [ʊ(ə~ɐ)r] vowels are the same for rhotic and non-rhotic speakers, but the NEAR and CURE are tenser at the beginning than their British equivalents.

RP triphthongs (e. g. in words like "tower" and "tire") are realised as [ɐʊɛr] and [ɐɪɛr] for rhotic speakers, [ɐʊɐ] and [ɐɪɐ] for non-rhotic ones; they are almost never turning into diphthongs or monophthongs.

=== Suprasegmental features ===
In Maltese English, the tendency to use weak and reduced forms is less prominent than in RP or AmE: unstressed vowels are longer and less reduced; there are fewer weak forms of auxiliary verbs and fewer contractions ("we're"). This is coupled with frequent insertion of a glottal stop at the beginning and end of words, which additionally prevents the liaison (addition of a /j/ or /w/ in sequences like "he is" or "go around").

Due to the aforementioned factors, Maltese English sounds more syllable-timed than RP, resembling the Italian accent in English, especially among the speakers of the low-prestige variety.

Stress is often moved to a later syllable if the RP stresses any syllable other than the last one: "centimetre" is cen.ti.'me.tre; words ending with -ism are pronounced with a Maltese stress on the final heavy syllable: cri.ti.'cism.

Common intonation patterns of Maltese English are a high rising terminal in polar questions and interrogatives, including questions disguised as statements, as opposed to the falling or rising-falling intonation in RP. The same pattern is observed in declarative statements and imperatives.

== Morphosyntax ==
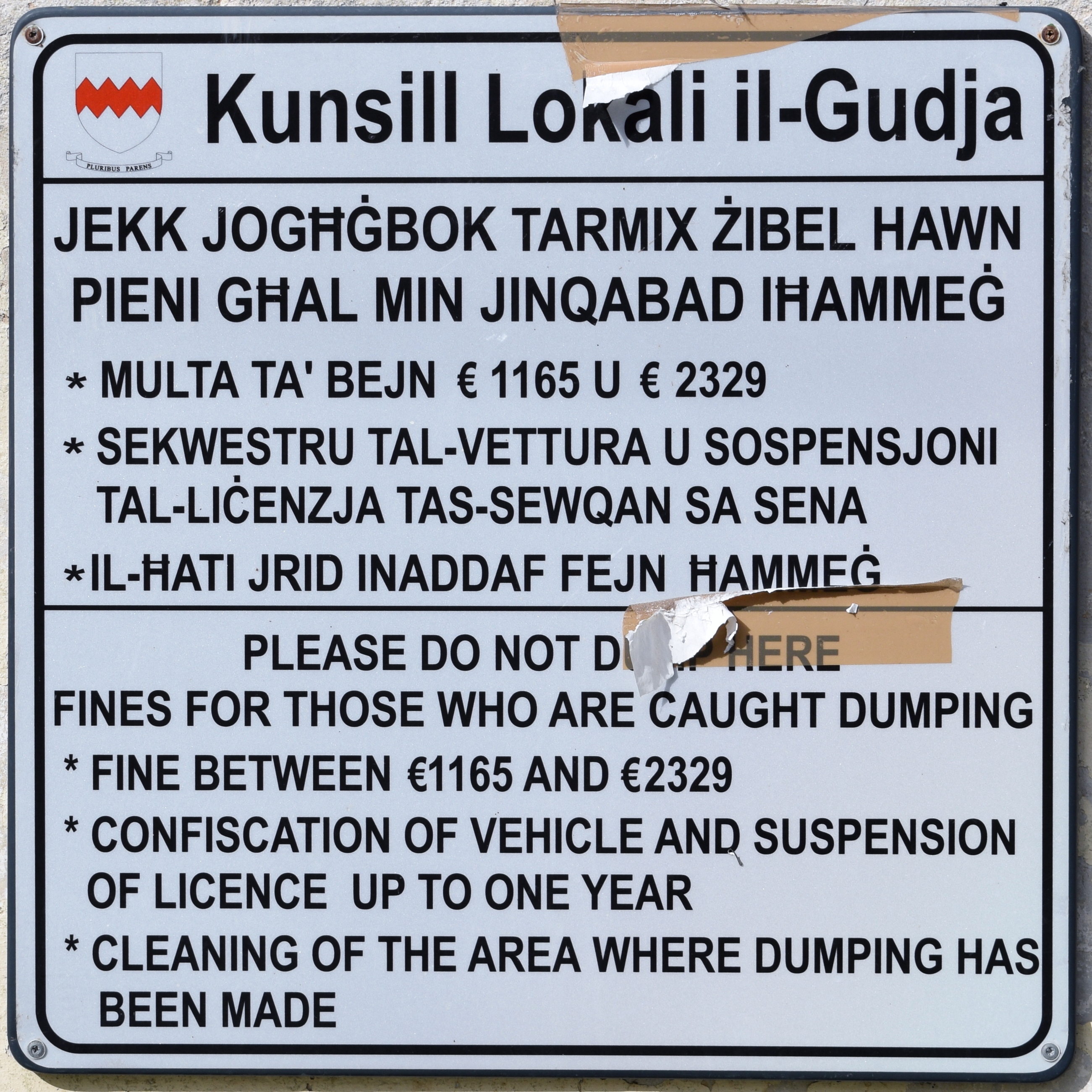
A bilingual plaque in Maltese and English

Morphosyntactically, Maltese English has four prominent features: a special "want" construction, a sentence-final "but", omission of "the" and special use of progressive aspect.

Maltese English uses a special volitional construction with the verb "to want": the dependent clause starts with a subjective pronoun, and both verbs are finite; it mainly happens in questions in offers and is much more frequent in spoken language. This syntactical pattern is likely borrowed from Maltese language, although in Maltese, the matrix clause (Note: A clause that contains a subordinate clause) can be marked for tense, and the subjects of the two clauses can refer to the same noun.

- Do you want I stand over there?

Another borrowed construction is the sentence-final "but" to mean "though"; it occurs in both Maltese and Italian. It also is less common in writing.

- I like this painting, I prefer the other one, but.

Questions without "do"-support are common in general, including with the special "want" construction: "You want I buy a drink for you?"

"The" can occur in quasi-locatives like "learn at the school", but it is often omitted when preceding job titles ("dean"), language-denoting adjectives ("Albanian language") and government institutions ("cabinet"), especially when the person or the organisation is inherently definite or recognisable. Increased definite article omission is typical for all English dialects, but in the International Corpus of English, the use of "cabinet" without an article is only found in Maltese.

=== Progressive ===
The use of progressives in Maltese English is mostly similar to British English, but the former uses the progressive aspect with modal and some stative verbs more often.

- ...the winding roads that we are having it's quite expensive yeah.

Progressive aspect can also occur in habitual constructions: "every month we are gathering all this data..."

Maltese English has an iterative/progressive construction similar to Maltese: "stay" + verb + -ing: "we don't want to stay changing currency."

On the other hand, using progressive aspect with verbs denoting preference and dispreference for emphasis is common in BrE and AmE, but rare in MaltE.

Bonnici et al. (2012) found that the quotative construction "be like" is spreading in MaltE, although it is limited to speakers younger than 35. Another markedly Maltese quotative is "tell".

- She told me, "Go and buy the milk"

=== Other features ===
Maltese English exhibits many features typical for ESL varieties: inconsistent marking of the third person singular verb forms ("she go", "Maltese people who tries to show off"), simple present replacing perfective ("I live here since 1999"), double marking on comparatives ("more better") etc.

Maltese English is more topic-prominent than the "inner circle" varieties.

- Maltese English, I do not use a lot.

== Discourse markers ==
The discourse marker "eh" (/ɛɪ/ in higher-prestige varieties an /ɛ~ɛː/ in others) is used much more often than in any national varieties of English, potentially due to the existence of a similar tag in Italian and Maltese. "No" is another common tag that can be attributed to language contact with Romance languages.

The word "alright?" /ɔ(ː)ˈraɪt/ is a common MaltE and Maltese greeting.

Maltese English speakers often repeat the word "yes" three or even four times, just like the Italian "si, si, si".

The construction "even I" lost its emphatic character and simply means "me too".

The phrase "first of all" became a discourse marker; it is often used in the beginning of the turn to speak.

== Lexicon ==
Overall, Maltese English uses more British forms than American ones (e. g. preferring "nappies" to "diapers") and British spelling conventions, but younger speakers use more Americanised spelling and more American words in general.

Italian loanwords and Maltese calques affect Maltese English too, for example, by changing the meaning of the word "pretend" to also mean "demand" and changing the meaning of the word "scope" to mean "goal" or "aim".
