= Maltenglish =

Phenomenon of code-switching

- Manglish, Minglish, Maltese English, Pepè
- Region: Malta, Maltese diaspora
- Language family: mixed Maltese–English

Language codes
- ISO 639-3: –

Maltenglish, also known as Manglish, Minglish, Maltese English, Pepè or Maltingliż refers to the phenomenon of code-mixing or code-switching between Maltese, a Semitic language derived from late medieval Sicilian Arabic with Romance superstrata, and English, an Indo-European Germanic language with Romance superstrata. It is separate from the local dialect of English, which is also called Maltese English.

Both Maltese and English are official languages in Malta, and about 88% of the Maltese people can speak English as a second language. Various Maltese social groups switch back and forth between the two languages, or macaronically mix lexical aspects of Maltese and English while engaging in informal conversation or writing.

The term Maltenglish is first recorded in 2007. Other colloquial portmanteau words include (chronologically): Minglish (2006), Malglish (2016), and Manglish (2016).

Maltenglish can also refer to English loanwords in the Maltese language.

== Prevalence ==
Code-switching is practiced by at least a third of the population regularly.

The most common areas where code-switching occurs are in part of the Northern Harbour District, mainly in the towns of Sliema, St. Julian's, Pembroke, Swieqi, Madliena, San Ġwann and Kappara. These areas are sometimes stereotyped as tal-pepé.

== Examples ==
	English	Maltese	Maltenglish
Mixed case	Give mummy a kiss.	Tiha bewsa 'l ommok.	Tiha kiss 'ill-mummy.
In a Maltese sentence	The actor of that film took the limo to meet the director.	L-attur ta' dak il-film mar jiltaqa' mad-direttur bil-limużin.	L-actor ta' dak il-film mar jiltaqa' mad-director bil-limo.
In an English sentence	So tell him I'm coming now, you know, because I can't make it tomorrow.	Mela għidlu li ġejja issa, ta, għax ma nistax għada.	Mela tell him I'm coming now, ta, għax I can't make it tomorrow.

While code switching in English sentences is most predominant in the Northern Harbour District, code switching in a Maltese sentence is much more common throughout the country. This is usually because the Maltese word is not so well known or used. Examples include:

- the Maltese word for a mushroom is faqqiegħ, but most people still tend to call it a mushroom in Maltese.
- the word for television in standard Maltese is televiżjoni (as derived from Italian), but most people still call it a television, for example Rajt film fuq it-television ilbieraħ ("I saw a film on television yesterday").

== See also ==
- Languages of Malta
- Llanito
- Żejtun dialect
- Qormi dialect
