= Languages of Malta =

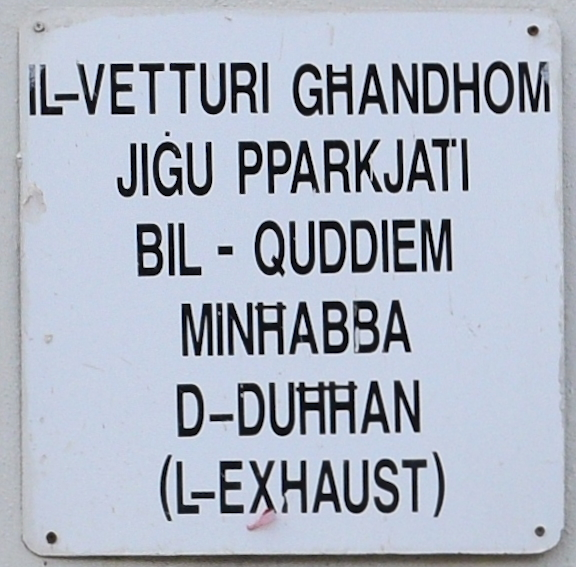
- Maltese language signs in Ħal Luqa
- Official: Maltese, Maltese Sign Language and English
- National: Maltese
- Recognised: Italian (62–66% conversational), Arabic, French, German, Russian, Spanish, Serbian
- Signed: Maltese Sign Language
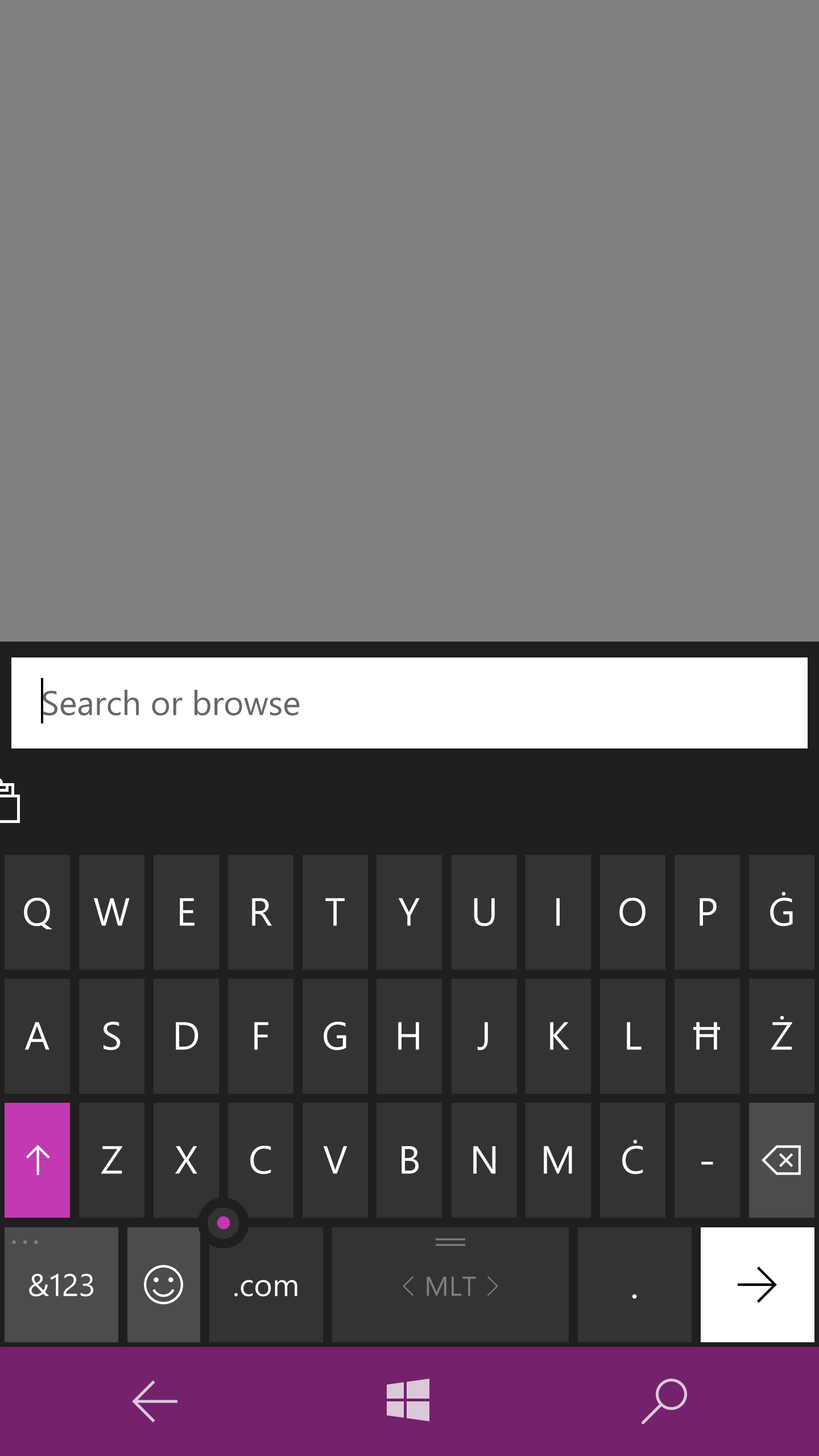
- Keyboard layout: Maltese QWERTY

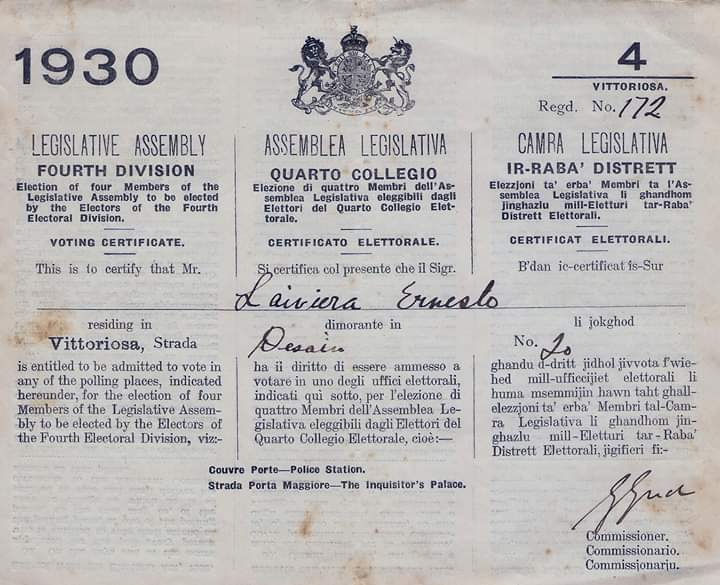
Tri-lingual voting document for the later cancelled 1930 elections in Malta in English, Italian and Maltese

Malta has three official languages: Maltese, Maltese Sign Language and English. Maltese is the national language. Until 1934, Italian was also an official language in Malta, and in the 19th and 20th centuries there was a linguistic and political debate known as the Language Question about the roles of these three languages. The Maltese population is generally able to converse in languages which are not native to the country, particularly English and Italian. They can also somewhat understand Darija.

In 2022, Malta National Statistics Office states that 90 percent of the Maltese population has at least a basic knowledge of Maltese. Also, 96 percent of the population has at least a basic knowledge of English, 62 percent of Italian, and 20 percent of French. According to the Eurobarometer poll conducted in 2012, 98% of Maltese people can speak Maltese, 88% can speak English, 66% can speak Italian, and more than 17% speak French. This shows a recent increase in fluency in languages, since in 1995, while 98% of the population spoke Maltese, only 76% spoke English, 36% Italian, and 10% French. It shows an increase in Italian fluency, compared to when Italian was an official language of Malta, due to Italian television broadcasts reaching Malta.

According to the 2011 census, there were 377,952 people aged 10 and over, of whom 357,692 people (94.7%) declared that they spoke Maltese at least at an average level, 248,570 (82.1%) that they spoke English at least at an average level and 93,401 (43.7%) that they spoke Italian at least at an average level, out of a scale made of "Well", "Average", "A little" and "Not at all". French, Russian, Spanish, and German are the other main languages studied in secondary and tertiary education.

== Background ==
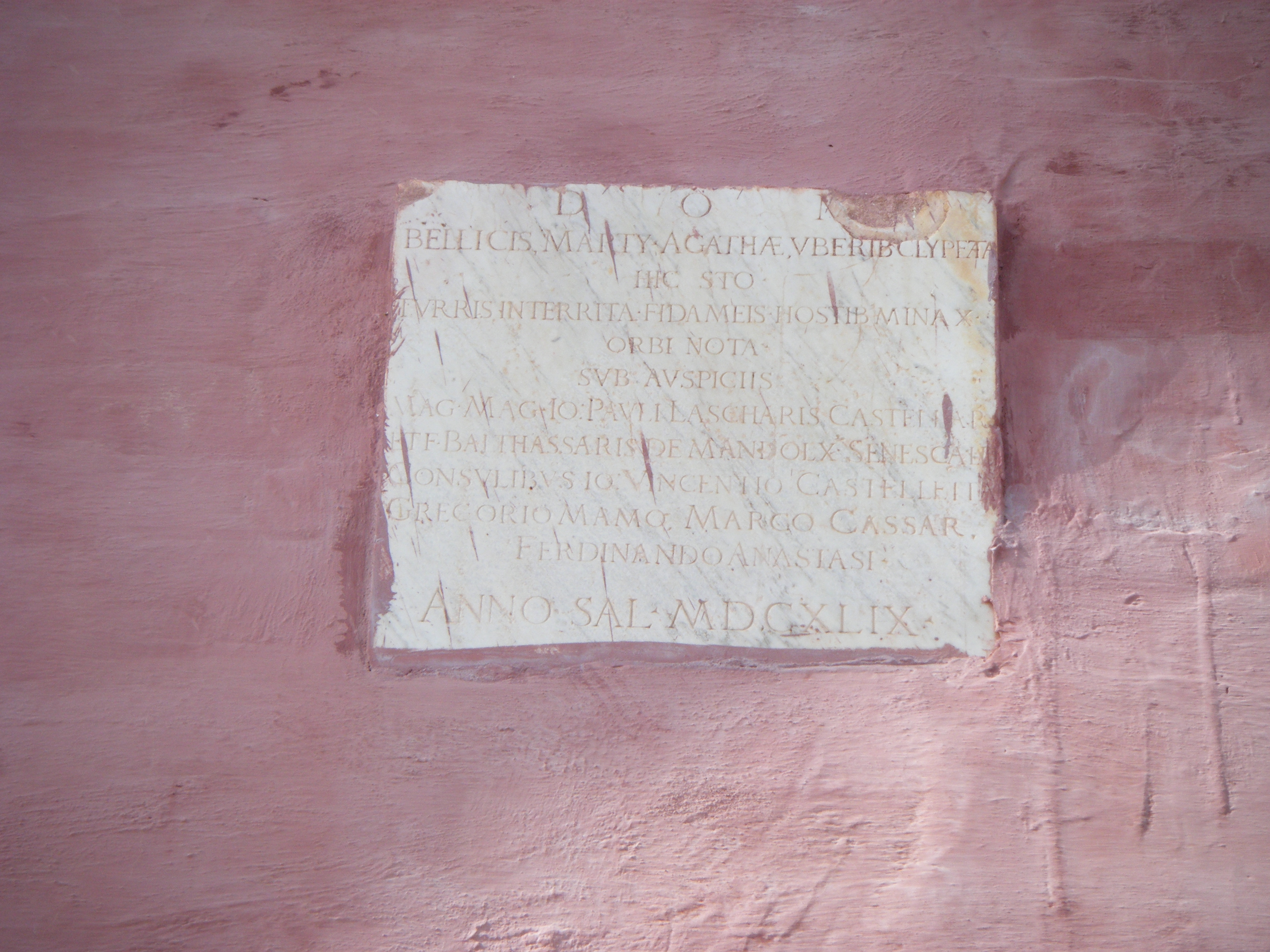
A Latin inscription from 1649 at Saint Agatha's Tower.

Greek was made an official language of Malta in 553 as part of Sicily by Justinian I, the Eastern Roman Emperor. Though Siculo-Arabic became officially used in Muslim Sicily in the 9th century, the upper class continued to use Greek until Norman rule (1091–1194). Greek began to be replaced by Medieval Latin in documents around 1130.

For several centuries, Malta was ruled by the order of the Knights of Malta, with members coming from different parts of Europe, when, beside Tuscan dialects, Latin was commonly used for official purposes such as at the Castellania. During the rule of the Order of St. John, many knights were French, and Middle French was used by the community in everyday life. However, Italian varieties remained dominant for official purposes. However, because prominent military engineers of the order were French, French was often used for documentation and maps,.

French was the official language of the Maltese islands during the brief French occupation of Malta (1798–1800).

== Maltese ==
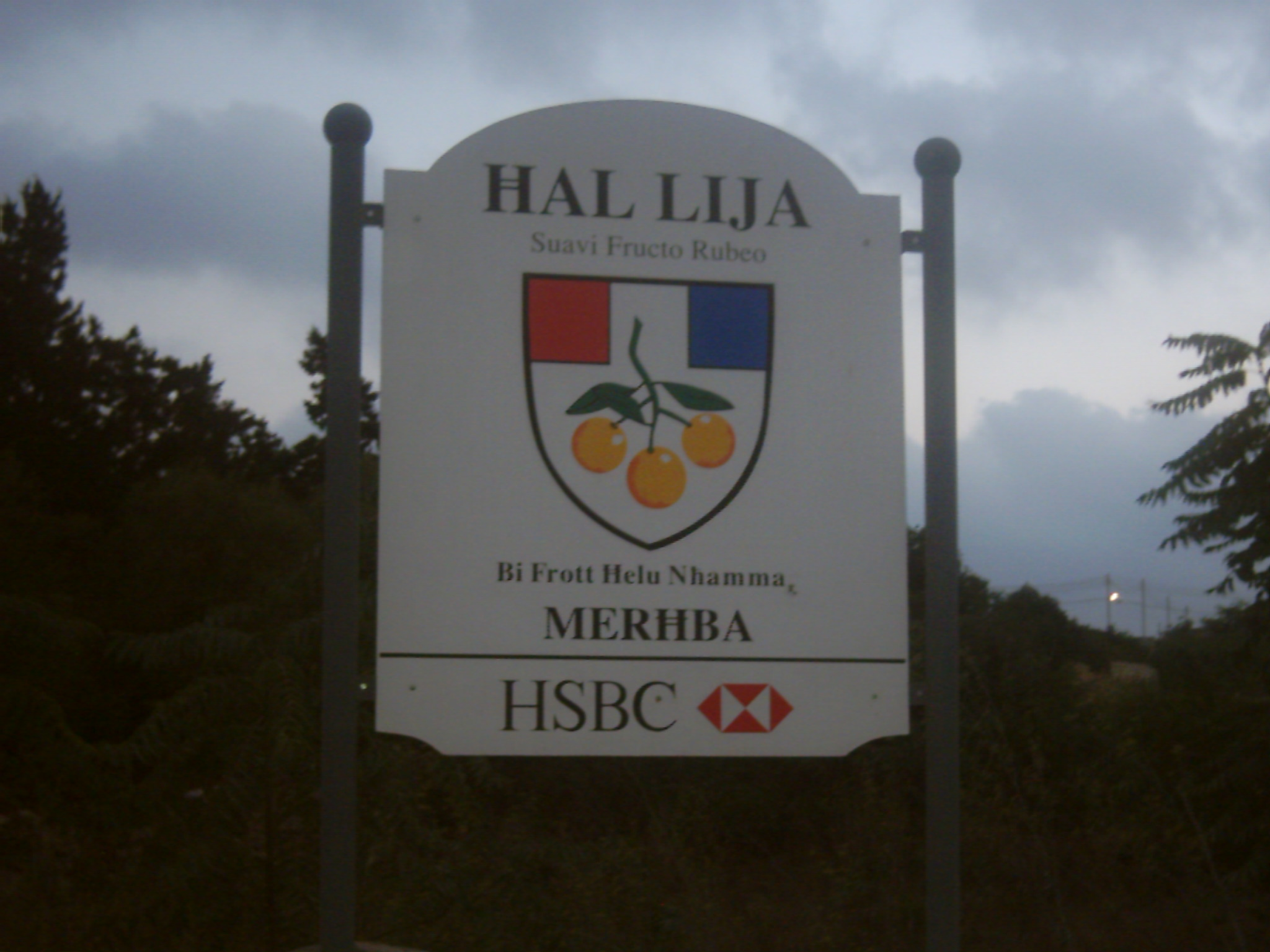
A Maltese welcome sign to the village of Ħal Lija, making use of the letter Ħ, unique to Maltese. Suavi fructo rubeo is a Latin motto, meaning "I glow red with sweet fruit", referring to the many orange orchards present in the village.

Maltese is the national language of the Maltese people, and one of the official languages of Malta and the European Union. It is one of the Semitic languages and is descended from Siculo-Arabic. However, a majority of its vocabulary comes from Sicilian and Italian, as described by Maltese linguist May Butcher. 52% of Maltese words are of Romance origin, a result of significant influence from Sicily, Italy, and, to a lesser extent, France. Malta holds the distinction of being the only country in Europe with a historically Semitic language. Maltese is written with a modified Latin Alphabet that includes the graphemes ż, ċ, ġ, ħ, and għ.

Various localities have accents and dialects divergent from standard Maltese. There has been a decline in the number of dialectal speakers, mostly because of exposure to standard Maltese in the media and the institutionalisation of education. The standard language also shows a more pronounced Italianization and Anglicization of the language.

Signers in Malta use the Maltese Sign Language.

== English ==
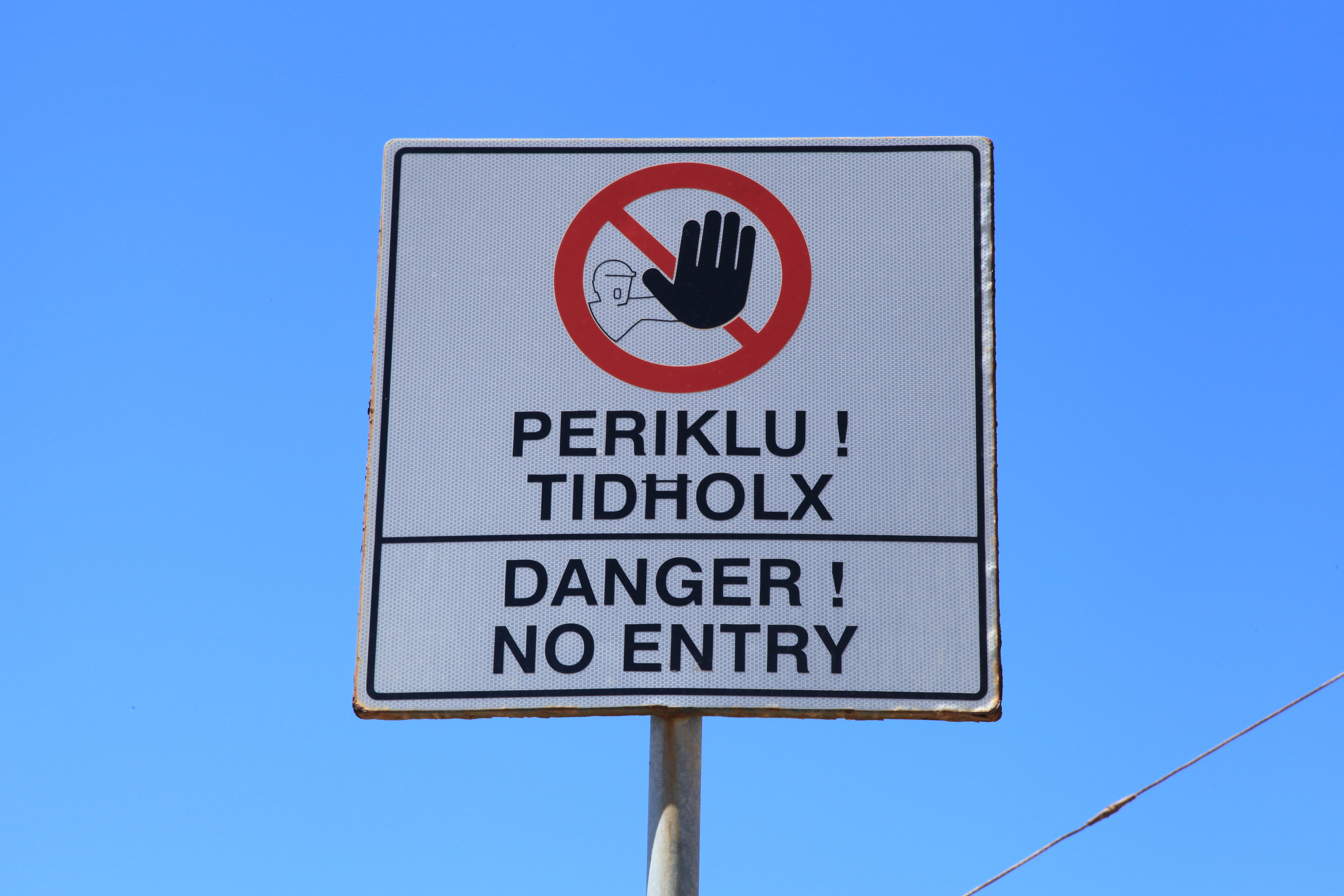
Bilingual danger sign at Comino in both Maltese and English

Prior to its independence in 1964 Malta had a significant history as a British possession and, as a result, English is an official language in Malta. Government business is carried out in both languages, and most Maltese learn English in school. Secondary and tertiary education is conducted exclusively in English. Today, 88% of Malta's population speak English (about 400,000 people). However, only about 10% speak English as a first language (about 48,000), as the majority speak Maltese as a first language.

The variety of English commonly spoken in Malta is based on British English. It is also heavily influenced by Maltese and Italian, not only in vocabulary (most commonly by pronouncing Franco-Latin loan words in English in an Italian style) but extending to phonology, with the English being heavily accented, in a mixed dialect sometimes called Maltenglish; however, Received Pronunciation remains standard amongst Maltese individuals of a high socioeconomic bracket.

== Italian ==
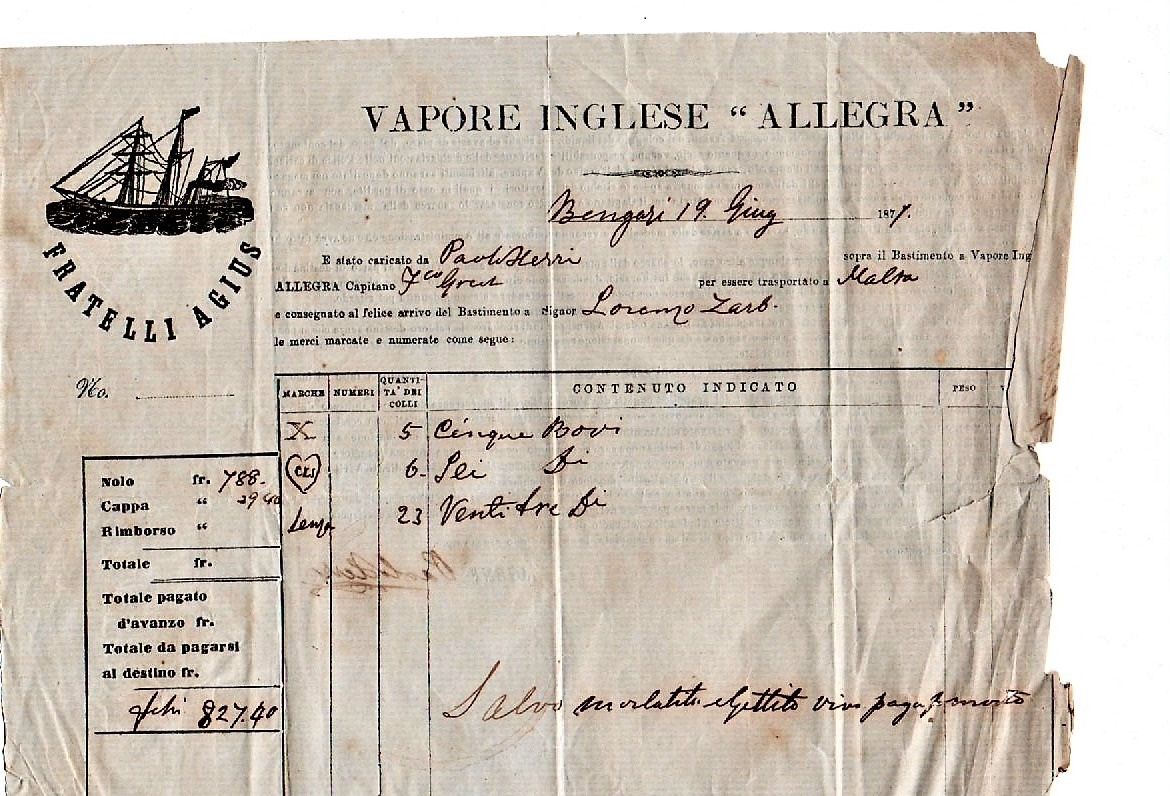
Italian-language loading bill of the English steamship Allegra, 1871 owned by Fratelli Agius, transporting cattle from Benghazi (then part of the Ottoman Empire) to Malta.

For many centuries and until 1934, Italian was the official language of Malta. Indeed, it was considered the language of culture in Malta since the Italian Renaissance. In the 19th century, Italian irredentists and Italian Maltese wanted to promote its use throughout Malta for plans to re-unify it to Italy as Malta was part of the Kingdom of Sicily up to 13th century. In the first decades of the 20th century, there was even a struggle within Maltese society and politics over the "language problem", which came to a head before World War II.

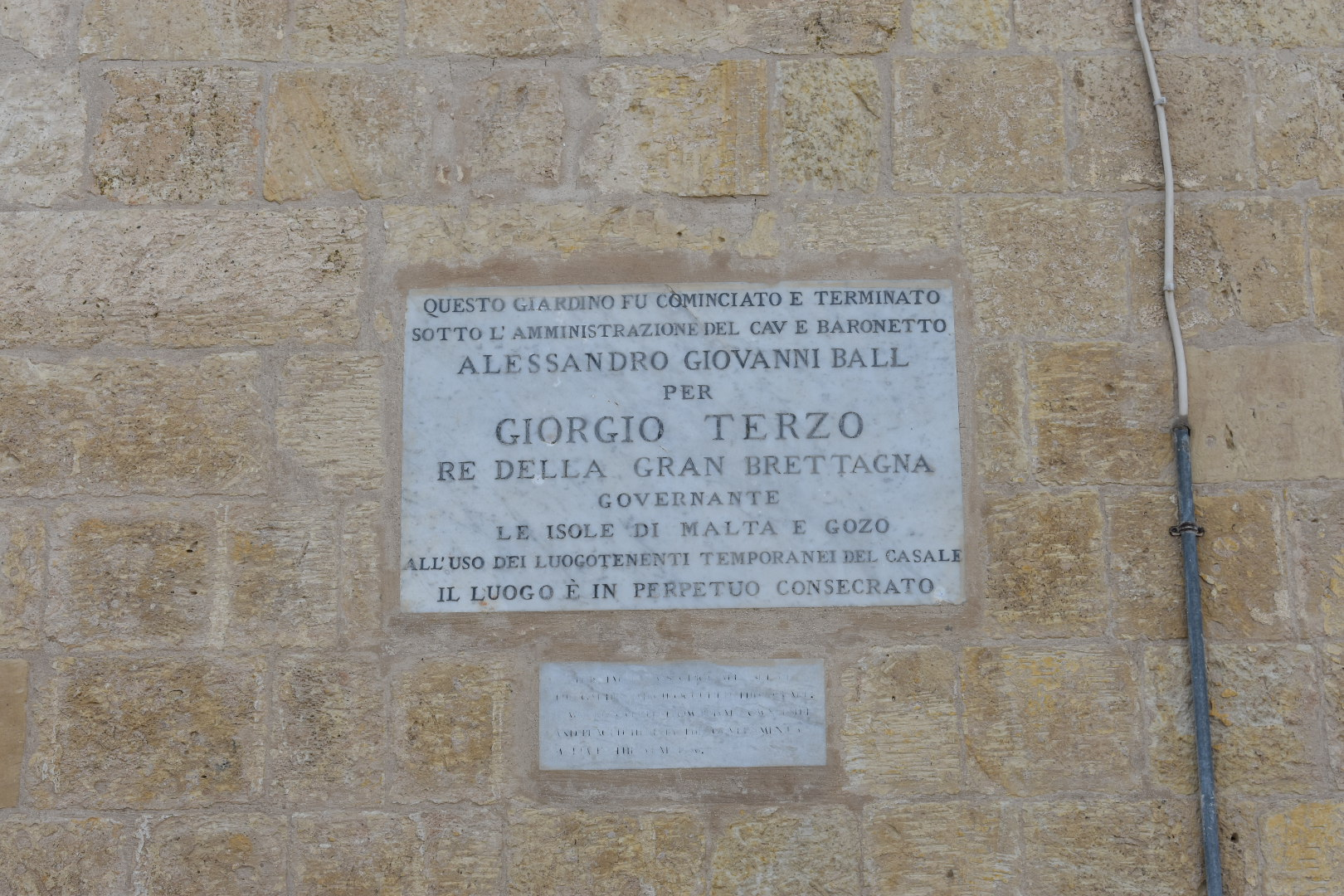
Italian inscription from the former Ġnien tal-Kmand at Żabbar. This inscription dates back from the early 19th century, when Malta was a British protectorate.

In 1933, the Constitution was withdrawn over the Government's budgetary vote for the teaching of Italian in elementary schools. The use of Italian in official matters was politically motivated by the anti-reformist party and by the Roman Catholic Church as a form of status quo and conservative measures against the Protestant British.

Today, 66% of the Maltese population can speak Italian, and 8% of the population "prefer" to use it in day-to-day conversation, due to the large recent influx of Italian immigrants. Although Italian has been replaced by English as an official language, it is still used and is spoken commonly in certain professional workplaces by Italian immigrants. The percentage of speakers today, 66%, is in fact much greater than when the language was actually official, in 1931, when only 14% spoke it.

A large number of Maltese learn Italian through Italian television as Italian media broadcast reach the Maltese Islands.

== Foreign languages ==
In addition to Italian, many Maltese generally have some degree of proficiency in French, and quite a few understand or speak Spanish or German. Several other languages are studied too, and Arabic and Russian are offered in schools.

The Governmental Circular letter for the school year 2011–2012 shows the following language options should be available in schools:

Form I (around the age of 11)

- Arabic
- French
- German
- Italian
- Spanish

This language is studied for the five years in secondary school.

Form III (around the age of 13)

- Arabic
- French
- German
- Italian
- Russian
- Spanish

This language is studied for the last three years in secondary school.

== Media ==
=== Publications ===
There are equal numbers of newspapers published in English and Maltese, with none in Italian.

The vast majority of people preferred English as their choice of reading, with English being preferred by 61.1% of the population for books and 70.89% for magazines. Only 35.8% of the population preferred to read books in Maltese, and 22.7% of them preferred it for magazines.

=== Radio ===
Regarding radio, Italian takes the place of English, with radio stations being predominantly in Maltese and Italian, with a few in English too.

According to a 2004 study, 82.41% of the population regularly listens to Maltese radio, 25.41% listens to Italian, and a smaller 14.69% listens to English radio.

=== Television ===
Local television channels are broadcast mainly in Maltese and sometimes English. However, many people have access to foreign television channels from Italy, the UK, or other European countries, or from the United States, either via local cable or digital terrestrial services, or directly via satellite.

=== Online usage of Maltese language ===
As of 2005, Maltese was not a commonly used language on the internet, with the majority of Maltese websites being written in other languages. Out of a survey conducted on 13 Maltese websites, 12 of them were entirely in English, with one being bilingual, but not Maltese. A Eurobarometer survey conducted in January 2011 concluded that only 6.5% of Maltese people prefer to browse and read the web in Maltese, though this may be due to lack of content in that language rather than snobbism. 82% stated that a Maltese language version of every Maltese website should be compulsory.

== Future ==
Possible scenarios for the future of Maltese are a subject of speculation among scholars. Dialectal variation of Maltese is in decline. There is influence from English and Italian and code-switching is widespread. Lexological and grammatical patterns in Maltese are increasingly anglicized, and there are even reported cases of language shift towards English in some especially affluent families, although this remains relatively uncommon. However this absorption of linguistic influences saturates the history of the Maltese language, which remains spoken by a very high percentage of the population.

== See also ==
- Maltenglish – code switching between Maltese and English

== Sources ==
- Hull, Geoffrey. The Malta Language Question: A Case Study in Cultural Imperialism. Said International, Valletta, 1993.
