= Imgarri dialect =

Dialect of Maltese language

Imgarri
- Imġarri
- Region: Mġarr
- Language family: Afro-Asiatic: Semitic; West Semitic; Central Semitic; Arabic; Maghrebi Arabic; Pre-Hilalian; Sicilian Arabic; Maltese; Imgarri
- Early forms: Central Maltese: Mosta dialect
- Dialects: Manikata dialect; Wied il-Għasel dialect; Australasian variants
- Writing system: Maltese alphabet

Language codes
- ISO 639-3: –
- IETF: mt-u-sd-mt31
- Mġarr in Malta

Imġarri (also known as the Mġarr dialect) is a dialect of the Maltese language spoken in the village of Mġarr.

It is believed to be closely related or otherwise an offshoot of the Mosta dialect, though not much is written about this early dialect. In 1994, it had about 3000 speakers.

== Phonology ==
	Labial		Dental/ Alveolar		Postalveolar	Palatal	Velar		Pharyngeal		Glottal
Nasal		m		n							
Plosive	p	b	t	d			k	ɡ			ʔ
Affricate			t͡s	d͡z	t͡ʃ d͡ʒ						
Fricative	f	v	s	z	ʃ ʒ				ħ	ʕ	
Trill				r							
Approximant				l		j		w			
