= Maltese Sign Language =

Deaf sign language of Malta

- Native to: Malta
- Native speakers: 200 (2014)
- Language family: Language isolate

Language codes
- ISO 639-3: mdl
- Glottolog: malt1238

A Maltese Sign Language user, recorded in Malta.

Maltese Sign Language (Maltese: Lingwa tas-Sinjali Maltija, LSM) is a young sign language of Malta.

== Development ==
Maltese Sign Language has existed in some form since the 1950s, when education of deaf children officially started in 1956; however, signing was neither taught nor encouraged. LSM developed into its modern form in the 1980s, with the establishment of the first deaf club in Malta in 1981, at Lastaris Wharf in Valletta. This space allowed Deaf individuals to congregate and interact more regularly, allowing the language to proliferate and develop from more basic home signs. The term "Maltese Sign Language" was first used in 1986.

In the 1990s, signing began to be encouraged among Deaf students in some schools. During early education involving sign language, teachers exposed students to signs from British Sign Language and Gestuno; however, these signs were largely not retained.

Maltese Sign Language uses a one-handed alphabet system, unlike BSL, which has a two-handed alphabet. It is thought this system developed from 17th-century Spanish Sign Language.

== Official recognition and use ==
The Archdiocese of Malta has offered limited LSM interpretation of Mass since 2010. The Archdiocese has also translated scripture passages and some prayers into LSM, making these filmed translations available online.

LSM courses have been offered by the University of Malta since 2015.

In March 2016, the Maltese Parliament recognized LSM as an official language of the country. Following recognition of LSM nationally, the Maltese Sign Language Council was established "to advise on matters related to sign language, support research, and promote its development".

Despite official recognition, the Deaf community in Malta has struggled with shortages of qualified LSM interpreters. In 2000, the country had one interpreter; by 2014, only four, while there were 15 deaf students in Malta's schools who could benefit from interpretation. In 2016, Aġenzija Sapport launched an LSM interpretation service. By 2018, the country had eight interpreters, five of whom worked for Aġenzija Sapport, and three who were freelancers. In October 2018, the University of Malta launched an LSM Interpretation postgraduate program; in November 2021, the University graduated its first class of LSM interpreters.

== Vocabulary ==
Due to the young age of LSM in comparison to other sign languages, many signs are not fully standardized. LSM speakers both develop their own signs and adopt signs from other sign languages when a standardized sign does not exist. Some adopted signs are maintained in their original form, while others are adapted into a form unique to LSM.

As with other sign languages, LSM makes use of many iconic signs, ie, signs that reference the specific traits or features of the idea being described. For example, the sign for book uses both hands to mimic opening a book. These more basic iconic signs tend to develop into more arbitrary signs for related concepts; the sign for library uses a similar motion to the sign for book, but with a different hand shape.

Many signs referring to locations draw on specific geographic or social traits; for example, the sign for house references the flat roofs of Maltese houses, while the sign for the island of Gozo references its three hills.

When forming new signs to describe more specific subjects, signers often sign the general term followed by a more specific descriptor; for example, the sign for "dog" followed by "spots" creates the sign "Dalmatian".

The LSM manual alphabet is used in combination with other signs. One such combination is a sign for Mediterranean ("Mediterran" in Maltese), which combines the letter handshape "M" with the sign for "sea". Some place names use fingerspelled abbreviations of Maltese names, such as "ATT" for Attard.

Younger signers tend to use the LSM manual alphabet more frequently than older signers, potentially due to lower literacy rates among the older population.

== Academic study and recording ==
LSM began to be studied by academics in the 1994. The Maltese Sign Language Research Project was set up at the University of Malta, and published two volumes of a sign language dictionary in 2003 and 2004.

Maria Galea has described the use of SignWriting when used to write Maltese Sign Language.

In the late 2010s, academics began work on an online, filmed LSM dictionary.

== In media ==
The Maltese public broadcaster PBS Ltd. began airing a nightly newscast in LSM on its TVM2 network in 2012.

LSM interpretation has been broadcast alongside episodes of Peppa Pig in Malta since January 2025.
