= Maltese language =

Semitic language spoken mostly in Malta

Maltese
- Malti
- Pronunciation: [ˈmɐːltɪ]
- Native to: Malta
- Ethnicity: Maltese
- Native speakers: 570,000 (2012)
- Language family: Afro-Asiatic: Semitic; West Semitic; Central Semitic; Arabic; Maghrebi; Pre-Hilalian; Pre-Hilalian Tunisian; Sicilian Arabic; Maltese
- Early forms: Sicilian Arabic: Old Maltese
- Dialects: Cottonera; Gozitan; Qormi; Żejtuni; Australian; Central; Western; Eastern; Żurrieq; Port Maltese; Mġarr; Xlukkajr; Għaxaq; Qawsra †
- Writing system: Latin (Maltese alphabet); Maltese Braille

Official status
- Official language in: Malta; European Union
- Recognised minority language in: Gibraltar; Victoria
- Regulated by: National Council for the Maltese Language; Il-Kunsill Nazzjonali tal-Ilsien Malti

Language codes
- ISO 639-1: mt
- ISO 639-2: mlt
- ISO 639-3: mlt
- Glottolog: malt1254
- Linguasphere: 12-AAC-c
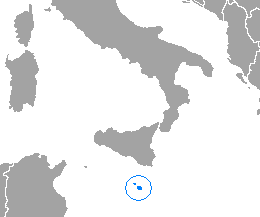

A Maltese speaker, recorded in Malta

Maltese (Maltese: Malti, also L-Ilsien Malti or Lingwa Maltija) is a Central Semitic language derived from late medieval Sicilian Arabic. It is the only Semitic language officially written in the Latin script. It is spoken by the Maltese people and is a national language of Malta, and is the only official Semitic and Afroasiatic language of the European Union. The pioneering Maltese linguists Canon Giovanni Pietro Francesco Agius de Soldanis and Mikiel Anton Vassalli both mistakenly hypothesised that Maltese originated from the Punic language. Later scholars like John L. Hayes considered it to be descended from a North African dialect of Colloquial Arabic, which was introduced to Malta when the Aghlabids captured it in the 9th century. However, genetic studies and historical evidence have established that Malta was depopulated after that raid, and that the island was subsequently repopulated by settlers from Sicily and Calabria who spoke Siculo-Arabic, which had developed as a Maghrebi Arabic dialect in the Emirate of Sicily between 831 and 1091. As a result of the Norman invasion of Malta and the subsequent re-Christianisation of the islands, Maltese evolved independently of Classical Arabic in a gradual process of Latinisation. It is therefore exceptional as a variety of historical Arabic that has no diglossic relationship with Classical or Modern Standard Arabic. Maltese is thus classified separately from the 30 varieties constituting the modern Arabic macrolanguage. Maltese is also distinguished from Arabic and other Semitic languages since its morphology has been deeply influenced by Romance languages, namely Italian and Sicilian.

The original Arabic base comprises around one-third of the Maltese vocabulary, especially words that denote basic ideas and the function words, but about half of the vocabulary is derived from standard Italian and Sicilian; English words make up 6–20% of the vocabulary. A 2016 study shows that, in terms of basic everyday language, speakers of Maltese are able to understand less than a third of what is said to them in Tunisian Arabic and Libyan Arabic, which are Maghrebi Arabic dialects related to Siculo-Arabic, whereas speakers of Tunisian Arabic and Libyan Arabic are able to understand about 40% of what is said to them in Maltese. This reported level of asymmetric intelligibility is considerably lower than the mutual intelligibility found between mainstream varieties of Arabic.

Maltese has always been written in the Latin script, the earliest surviving example dating from the late Middle Ages. It is the only standardised Semitic language written exclusively in the Latin script.

== History ==
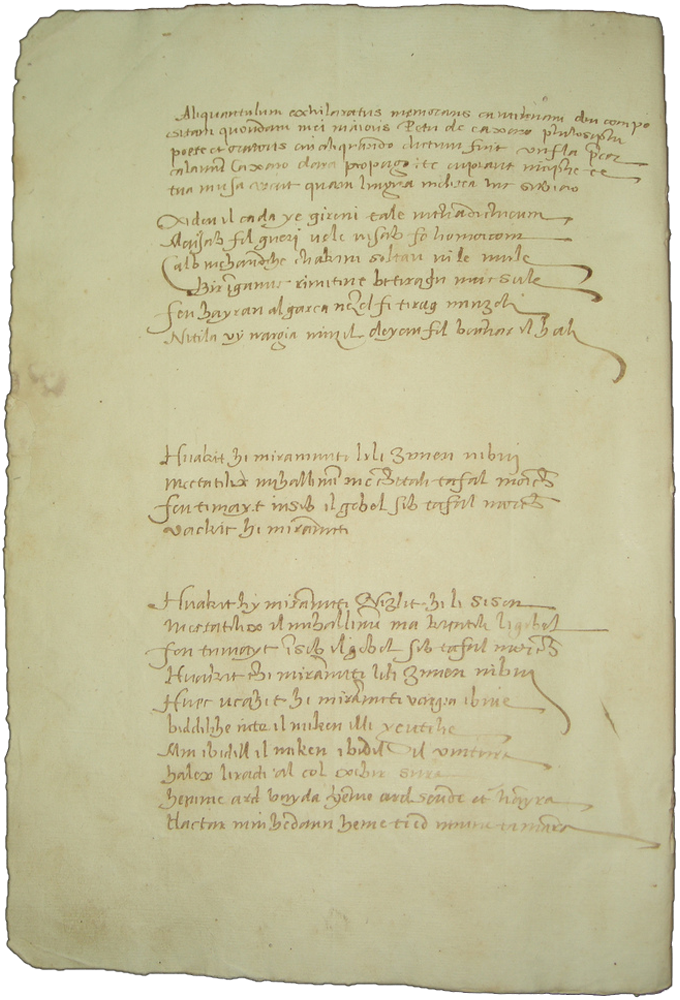
Oldest Maltese text: Il-Kantilena by Pietru Caxaro, 15th century

The origins of the Maltese language are attributed to the arrival, early in the 11th century, of settlers from neighbouring Sicily, where Siculo-Arabic was spoken, reversing the Fatimid Caliphate's conquest of the island at the end of the 9th century.

The Norman conquest in 1091, followed by the expulsion of the Muslims, complete by 1249, permanently isolated the vernacular from its Arabic source, creating the conditions for its evolution into a distinct language. In contrast to Sicily, where Siculo-Arabic became extinct and was replaced by Sicilian, the vernacular in Malta continued to develop alongside Italian, eventually replacing it as official language in 1934, alongside English. The first written reference to the Maltese language is in a will of 1436, where it is called lingua maltensi. The oldest known document in Maltese, Il-Kantilena (Xidew il-Qada) by Pietru Caxaro, dates from the 15th century.

The earliest known Maltese dictionary was a 16th-century manuscript entitled "Maltese-Italiano"; it was included in the Biblioteca Maltese of Mifsud in 1764, but is now lost. A list of Maltese words was included in both the Thesaurus Polyglottus (1603) and Propugnaculum Europae (1606) of Hieronymus Megiser, who had visited Malta in 1588–1589; Domenico Magri gave the etymologies of some Maltese words in his Hierolexicon, sive sacrum dictionarium (1677).

An early manuscript dictionary, Dizionario Italiano e Maltese, was discovered in the Biblioteca Vallicelliana in Rome in the 1980s, together with a grammar, the Regole per la Lingua Maltese, attributed to a French knight named Thezan. The first systematic lexicon is that of Giovanni Pietro Francesco Agius de Soldanis, who also wrote the first systematic grammar of the language and proposed a standard orthography.

The use of the language declined heavily under the British administration of Malta compared with English. Following the independence of Malta, language reforms under the Dom Mintoff government saw the language increase in use and today it is used regularly in Malta.

== Demographics ==
Ethnologue reports a total of 530,000 Maltese speakers: 450,000 in Malta and 79,000 in the diaspora. Most speakers also use English, usually the local dialect known as Maltese English.

The largest diaspora community of Maltese speakers is in Australia, with 36,000 speakers reported in 2006 (down from 45,000 in 1996, and expected to decline further).

The Maltese linguistic community in Tunisia originated in the 18th century. Numbering several thousand in the 19th century, it was reported to be only 100 to 200 people as of 2017.

== Classification ==
Maltese is descended from Siculo-Arabic, a Semitic language within the Afroasiatic family. In the course of its history, Maltese has been influenced by Sicilian, Italian, to a lesser extent by Norman, and, more recently, English. Today, the core vocabulary (including both the most commonly used vocabulary and function words) is Semitic, with a large number of loanwords. Due to the Sicilian influence on Siculo-Arabic, Maltese has many language contact features and is most commonly described as a language with a large number of loanwords.

Maltese has historically been classified in various ways, with some arguing that it was derived from ancient Punic (another Semitic language) instead of Siculo-Arabic, and others arguing it is one of the Berber languages (another language family within Afroasiatic). Implausibly, Fascist Italy classified it as regional Italian.

== Dialects ==
Urban varieties of Maltese are closer to Standard Maltese than rural varieties, which have some characteristics that distinguish them from Standard Maltese. They tend to show some archaic features such as the realisation of ⟨kh⟩ and ⟨gh⟩ and the imāla of Arabic ā into ē (or ī especially in Gozo), considered archaic because they are reminiscent of 15th-century transcriptions of this sound. Another archaic feature is the realisation of Standard Maltese ā as ō in rural dialects. There is also a tendency to diphthongise simple vowels, e.g. ū becomes eo or eu. Rural dialects also tend to employ more Semitic roots and broken plurals than Standard Maltese. In general rural Maltese is less distant from its Siculo-Arabic ancestor than is Standard Maltese.

== Phonology ==
=== Consonants ===
Consonant phonemes
		Labial	Dental/Alveolar		Palatal (-alveolar)	Velar	Laryngeal
		Labial	plain	sibilant	Palatal (-alveolar)	Velar	Laryngeal
Nasal		m	n				
Plosive/ Affricate	voiceless	p	t	t͡s	t͡ʃ	k	ʔ
Plosive/ Affricate	voiced	b	d	d͡z	d͡ʒ	ɡ	
Fricative	voiceless	f		s	ʃ		ħ
Fricative	voiced	v		z	ʒ		
Approximant			l		j	w	
Trill			r				

- /ʔ/ is glottal while /ħ/ is pharyngeal.

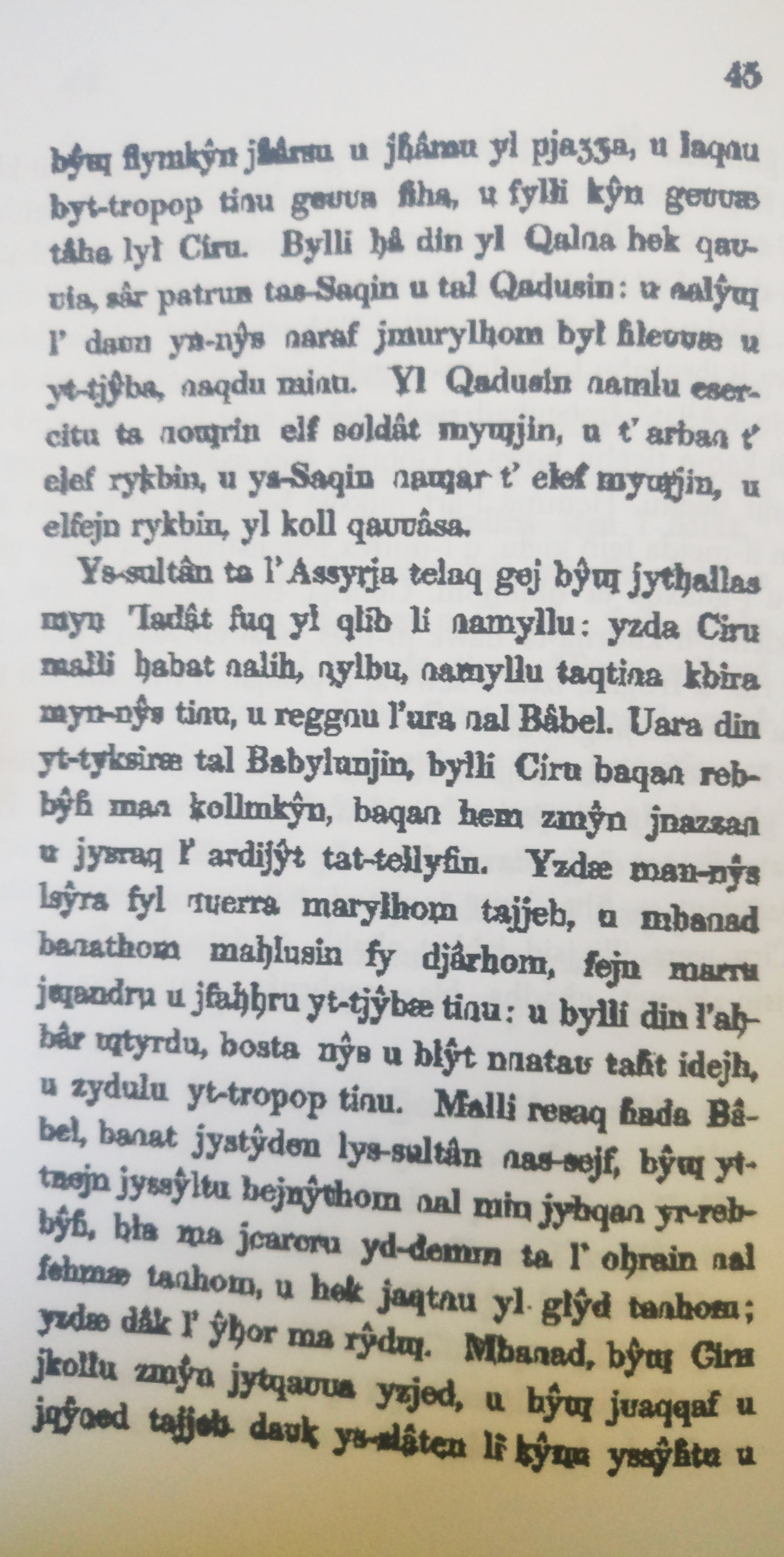
Vassalli's Storja tas-Sultân Ċiru (1831) is an example of Maltese orthography in the 19th century, before the later standardisation introduced in 1924. Note the similarities with the various varieties of romanised Arabic.

Voiceless stops are only lightly aspirated and voiced stops are fully voiced. Voicing is carried over from the last segment in obstruent clusters; thus, two- and three-obstruent clusters are either voiceless or voiced throughout, e.g. /niktbu/ is realised [ˈniɡdbu] "we write". (Similar assimilation phenomena occur in languages such as French and Czech.) Maltese has final-obstruent devoicing of voiced obstruents and word-final voiceless stops have no audible release, making voiceless–voiced pairs phonetically indistinguishable in word-final position.

Gemination is distinctive word-medially and word-finally in Maltese. The distinction is most rigid intervocalically after a stressed vowel. Stressed, word-final closed syllables with short vowels end in a long consonant, and those with a long vowel in a single consonant; the only exception is where historic *ʕ and *ɣ meant the compensatory lengthening of the succeeding vowel. Some speakers have lost length distinction in clusters.

The two nasals /m/ and /n/ assimilate for place of articulation in clusters. /t/ and /d/ are usually dental, whereas /t͡s d͡z s z n r l/ are all alveolar. /t͡s d͡z/ are found mostly in words of Italian origin, retaining length (if not word-initial). /d͡z/ and /ʒ/ are only found in loanwords, e.g. /ɡɐdˈd͡zɛt.tɐ/ gazzetta "newspaper" and /tɛ.lɛˈvɪ.ʒɪn/ televixin "television". The pharyngeal fricative /ħ/ is velar ([x]), uvular ([χ]), or glottal ([h]) for some speakers.

=== Vowels ===
	Front		Central		Back	
	short	long	short	long	short	long
Close		iː				
Near-close	ɪ	ɪː			ʊ	ʊː
Open-mid	ɛ	ɛː			ɔ	ɔː
Near-open			ɐ	ɐː		
Diphthongs	/ɐɪ̯/ /ɐʊ̯/ /ɛɪ̯/ /ɛʊ̯/ /ɪʊ̯/ /ɔɪ̯/ /ɔʊ̯/					

Maltese has five short vowels, /ɐ ɛ ɪ ɔ ʊ/, written a e i o u; six long vowels, /ɐː ɛː ɪː iː ɔː ʊː/, written a, e, ie, i, o, u, all of which (with the exception of ie /ɪː/) can be known to represent long vowels in writing only if they are followed by an orthographic għ or h (otherwise, one needs to know the pronunciation; e.g. nar (fire) is pronounced /nɐːr/); and seven diphthongs, /ɐɪ ɐʊ ɛɪ ɛʊ ɪʊ ɔɪ ɔʊ/, written aj or għi, aw or għu, ej or għi, ew, iw, oj, and ow or għu.

=== Historical phonology ===
The Maltese consonant system has undergone several changes when compared with Classical Arabic:

Classical Arabic	Letter	ت	ط	ث	د	ض	ذ	ظ	س	ص	ح	خ	ع	غ	ء	ق	ه
Classical Arabic	Romanisation	t	ṭ	ṯ	d	ḍ	ḏ	ẓ	s	ṣ	ḥ	ẖ	ʿ	ġ	ʾ	q	h
Classical Arabic	Pronunciation	/t/	/tˤ/	/θ/	/d/	/dˤ/	/ð/	/ðˤ/	/s/	/sˤ/	/ħ/	/x~χ/	/ʕ/	/ɣ~ʁ/	/ʔ/	/q/	/h/
Maltese	Letter	T t			D d				S s		Ħ ħ		Għ għ			Q q	H h
Maltese	Pronunciation	/t/			/d/				/s/		/ħ/		/ʕ/			/ʔ/	

While many of these changes (chiefly the merger of emphatic consonants with their non-pharyngealised counterparts) are the result of European influence, others (such as the merger of ق /q/ into /ʔ/) are found in other varieties of Arabic, and may be either independent developments or features of the Sicilian Arabic dialect which Maltese descends from.

== Orthography ==
=== Alphabet ===
The modern system of Maltese orthography was introduced in 1924. Below is the Maltese alphabet, with IPA symbols and approximate English pronunciation:

Letter	Name	IPA (letter name)	Maltese example	IPA (orthographically representing)	Approximate English pronunciation
A a	a	aː	aħmar 'red'	ɐ, aː, æː	Similar to 'u' in nut in RP; [aː] similar to father in Irish English; [æː] similar to cat in American English. In some dialects, it may be [ɒː] in certain locations as in what in some American English dialects.
B b	be	beː	baħar 'sea'	b	bar, but at the end of a word, it is devoiced to [p].
Ċ ċ	ċe	t͡ʃeː	ċavetta 'key'	t͡ʃ	church (note: undotted 'c' has been replaced by 'k', so when 'c' does appear, it is to be spoken the same way as 'ċ')
D d	de	deː	dar 'home'	d	day, but at the end of a word, it is devoiced to [t].
E e	e	eː	erbgħa 'four'	eː, ɛ, øː, ə	[e:] somewhat like face in Northern England English; [ɛ] end. When short, it is often changed to [øː, œ] when following, and more often when followed by, 'w'. When at the end of a word in an unstressed syllable, it is pronounced as schwa [ə, Vᵊ], as in comma.
F f	effe	ɛf(ː)ᵊ	faħam 'coal'	f	far
Ġ ġ	ġe	d͡ʒøː	ġar 'neighbour'	d͡ʒ	gem, but at the end of a word, it is devoiced to [tʃ].
G g	ge	geː	gawwija 'seagull'	ɡ	game, but at the end of a word, it is devoiced to [k].
Għ għ	ajn	ajn, æːn	għasfur 'bird'	(ˤ)ː, ħː	Has the effect of lengthening and pharyngealising associated vowels (għi and għu are [i̞(ˤ)j] (may be transcribed as [ə(ˤ)j]) and [oˤ]). When found at the end of a word, or immediately before 'h', it has the sound of a double 'ħ' (see below).
H h	akka	ak(ː)ɐ	hu 'he'		Not pronounced except in the word hieni; at the end of a word (such as ktibnih), even after adding the negating suffix (such as ma ktibnihx); or at the end of a verb, even after adding pronominal suffixes (such as xebbaht); in these cases, it has the sound of 'ħ'.
Ħ ħ	ħe	ħeː, heː, xe:	ħanut 'shop'	ħ	No English equivalent; sounds similar to /h/ but is articulated with a lowered larynx.
I i	i	iː	ikel 'food'	i̞ː, iː, ɪ	[i̞ː] bite (the way commonly realised in Irish English or [iː] in other words as beet but more forward) and when short, as [ɪ] bit. Occasionally, 'i' is used to display il-vokali tal-leħen (the vowel of the voice) as in words like l-iskola or l-iMdina; in this case, it takes the schwa sound.
Ie ie	ie	iːᵊ, ɛː	ieqaf 'stop'	ɛː, iːᵊ	Sounds similar to yield or RP near, or opened up slightly towards bed or RP square
J j	je	jə, jæ, jɛ	jum 'day'	j	yard
K k	ke	kə, kæ, kɛ	kelb 'dog'	k	kettle
L l	elle	ɛl(ː)ᵊ	libsa 'dress'	l	line
M m	emme	ɛm(ː)ᵊ	mara 'woman'	m	march
N n	enne	ɛn(ː)ᵊ	nanna 'granny'	n	next
O o	o	oː	ors 'bear'	o, ɔ, ɒ	[o] as in somewhere between similar to Scottish English o in no [ɔ] like 'aw' in RP law, but short or [ɒ] as in water in some American English dialects.
P p	pe	peː, pə	paġna 'page, sheet'	p	part
Q q	qe	ʔø, ʔ(ʷ)ɛ, ʔ(ʷ)æ, ʔ(ʷ)ə	qattus 'cat'	ʔ	glottal stop, found in the Cockney English pronunciation of "bottle" or the phrase "uh-oh" /ʔʌʔoʊ/.
R r	erre	ɛɹ(ː)ᵊ, æɹ(:)ᵊ, ɚ(ː)ᵊ or ɛr(ː)ᵊ, ær(:)ᵊ, ər(ː)ᵊ	re 'king'	r, ɹ	[r] as in General American English butter, or ɹ road (r realization changes depending on dialect or location in the word).
S s	esse	ɛs(ː)ᵊ	sliem 'peace'	s	sand
T t	te	teː	tieqa 'window'	t	tired
U u	u	uː, ʉ	uviera 'egg cup'	u, ʉ, ʊ	[u] as in General American English boot, or in some dialects, it may be realised as [ʉ] as in some American English realizations of student; short u is [ʊ] put.
V v	ve	vøː, veː, və	vjola 'violet'	v	vast, but at the end of a word, it is devoiced to [f].
W w	ve doppja /u doppja/we	vedɒp(ː)jɐ, uːdɒp(ː)jɐ, wøː	widna 'ear'	w	west
X x	xe	ʃə, ʃøː	xadina 'monkey'	ʃ / ʒ	shade, sometimes as measure; when doubled, the sound is elongated, as in "Cash shin" vs. "Cash in".
Ż ż	że/żeta	zə, zø:, ze:t(ɐ)	żarbun 'shoe'	z	maze, but at the end of a word, it is devoiced to [s].
Z z	ze	t͡sə, t͡søː, t͡seːt(ɐ)	zalza 'sauce'	t͡s / d͡z	pizza for [t͡s]

Final vowels with grave accents (à, è, ì, ò, ù) are also found in some Maltese words, mostly of Italian origin, such as sigurtà (old Italian: sicurtà 'security'), kafè (Italian: caffè 'coffee'), Marì (a name), però (Italian: però 'but') and tiramisù (Italian: tiramisù 'tiramisu').

The official rules governing the structure of the Maltese language are recorded in the official guidebook Tagħrif fuq il-Kitba Maltija (English: Knowledge on Writing in Maltese) issued by the Akkademja tal-Malti (Academy of the Maltese language). The first edition of this book was printed in 1924 by the Maltese government's printing press. The rules were further expanded in the 1984 book, iż-Żieda mat-Tagħrif, which focused mainly on the increasing influence of Romance and English words. In 1992 the academy issued the Aġġornament tat-Tagħrif fuq il-Kitba Maltija, which updated the previous works.

The National Council for the Maltese Language (KNM) is the main regulator of the Maltese language (see Maltese Language Act, below). However, the academy's orthography rules are still valid and official.

=== Written Maltese ===
Since Maltese evolved after the Italo-Normans ended Arab rule of the islands, a written form of the language was not developed for a long time after the expulsion of the Arabs in the middle of the thirteenth century. Under the rule of the Knights Hospitaller, both French and Italian were used for official documents and correspondence. During the British colonial period, the use of English was encouraged through education, with Italian being regarded as the next most important language.

In the late 18th century and throughout the 19th century philologists and academics such as Mikiel Anton Vassalli made a concerted effort to standardise written Maltese. Many examples of written Maltese exist from before this period, always in the Latin alphabet, Il-Kantilena from the 15th century being the earliest example of written Maltese. In 1934 Maltese was recognised as an official language.

=== Samples ===
Maltese has both Semitic vocabulary and words derived from Romance languages, primarily Italian. Words such as tweġiba (Arabic origin) and risposta (Italian origin) have the same meaning ("answer") but are both used in Maltese, rather like "answer" and "response" in English. Below are two versions of the same translations, one with vocabulary mostly derived from Semitic root words and the other using Romance loanwords from the Treaty establishing a Constitution for Europe (Note: Treaty establishing a Constitution for Europe Archived 2015-12-29 at the Wayback Machine, see p. 17 Archived 2020-08-04 at the Wayback Machine)

English	Maltese (Semitic vocabulary)	Maltese (Romance vocabulary)
The Union is founded on the values of respect for human dignity, freedom, democracy, equality, the rule of law and respect for human rights, including the rights of persons belonging to minorities. These values are common to the Member States in a society in which pluralism, non-discrimination, tolerance, justice, solidarity and equality between women and men prevail.	L-Għaqda hija mibnija fuq is-siwi ta' għadir għall-ġieħ il-bniedem, ta' ħelsien, ta' għażil il-ġemgħa, ta' ndaqs bejn il-ġnus, tas-saltna tad-dritt (Note: dritt (pl. drittijiet) is derived from Sicilian drittu (right).) u tal-għadir għall-ħaqq tal-bniedem, wkoll il-ħaqq ta' wħud li huma f'minoranzi. (Note: minoranza (pl. minoranzi) is derived from Italian minoranza (minority).) Dan is-siwi huwa mqassam bejn il-Pajjiżi (Note: pajjiż (pl. pajjiżi) is derived from Sicilian pajisi (country).) Msieħba, f'nies li tħaddan il-kotrija, li ma tgħejjibx, li ddann, li tgħaqqad u li tiżen indaqs in-nisa u l-irġiel.	L-Unjoni hija bbażata fuq il-valuri tar-rispett għad-dinjità tal-bniedem, il-libertà, id-demokrazija, l-ugwaljanza, l-istat tad-dritt u r-rispett għad-drittijiet tal-bniedem, inklużi d-drittijiet ta' persuni li jagħmlu parti minn minoranzi. Dawn il-valuri huma komuni għall-Istati Membri f'soċjetà fejn jipprevalu l-pluraliżmu, in-non-diskriminazzjoni, it-tolleranza, il-ġustizzja, is-solidarjetà u l-ugwaljanza bejn in-nisa u l-irġiel.

Below is the Lord's Prayer in Maltese compared to other Semitic languages (Arabic and Syriac) with cognates highlighted:

English	Maltese	Standard Arabic (Romanised)	Syriac (Romanised)
Our Father, who art in heaven, hallowed be thy name. Thy kingdom come, thy will be done, on earth, as it is in heaven. Give us this day our daily bread and forgive us our trespasses as we forgive those who trespass against us; and lead us not into temptation, but deliver us from evil. Amen	Missierna, li inti fis-smewwiet, jitqaddes ismek, tiġi saltnatek, ikun li trid int, kif fis-sema, hekkda fl-art. Ħobżna ta' kuljum agħtina llum. Aħfrilna dnubietna, bħalma naħfru lil min hu ħati għalina. U la ddaħħalniex fit-tiġrib, iżda eħlisna mid-deni. Ammen	ʔabāna, allaḏi fī as-samāwāt, li-yataqaddas ismuka, li-yaʔti malakūtuka, li-takun mašīʔatuka, kamā fī as-samāʔi kaḏālika ʕalā al-arḍ. ḵubzana kafāfanā ʔaʕṭinā alyawm, wa aḡfir lanā ḏunūbanā, kamā naḡfiru naḥnu ʔayḍan lil-muḏnibīn ʔilaynā. wa lā tudḵilna fī tajāriba, lākin najjinā min aš-širrīr. ʔāmīn	Abun, d-bashmayo, nithqadash shmokh, tithe malkuthokh, nehwe sebyonokh aykano d-bashmayo oph bar`o. hab lan lahmo d-sunqonan yowmono washbuq lan hawbayn wahtohayn aykano doph hnan shbaqan l-hayobayn lo ta`lan l-nesyuno elo paso lan men bisho Amin

Maltese pronunciation

Below is the Universal Declaration of Human Rights in Maltese compared to Arabic:

English	Maltese	Standard Arabic (Romanised)
All human beings are born free and equal in dignity and rights. They are endowed with reason and conscience and should act towards one another in a spirit of brotherhood.	Il-bnedmin kollha jitwieldu ħielsa u ugwali fid-dinjità u d-drittijiet. Huma mogħnija bir-raġuni u bil-kuxjenza u għandhom iġibu ruħhom ma' xulxin bi spirtu ta' aħwa.	Yūlad jamīʻ al-nās aḥrār-an mutasāwīn fil-karāma-ti wal-huqūq-i, wa-qad wuhibū ʻaql-an wa-ḍamīr-an wa-ʻalayhim an yuʻāmil-u baʻduhum baʻd-an bi-rūh al-ikhāʼ-i.

== Vocabulary ==
Although the original vocabulary of Maltese was Siculo-Arabic, it has incorporated a large number of borrowings from Romance sources (Sicilian, Italian, and French) and, more recently, Germanic ones (from English).

The historical source of modern Maltese vocabulary is 52% Italian/Sicilian, 32% Arabic/Siculo-Arabic, 10% French and 6% English, with the remainder being Spanish and German. Today, most function words are Arabic, so despite only making up about a third of the vocabulary, they are the most used when speaking the language. In this way, Maltese is similar to English, a Germanic language that has been strongly influenced by Norman French and Latin (58% of English vocabulary).

As a result of this, Romance language-speakers (and to a lesser extent English speakers) can often easily understand more technical ideas expressed in Maltese, such as Ġeografikament, l-Ewropa hi parti tas-superkontinent tal-Ewrasja ('Geographically, Europe is part of the supercontinent of Eurasia'), while not understanding a single word of a basic sentence such as Ir-raġel qiegħed fid-dar ('The man is in the house'), which would be easily understood by any Arabic speaker.

=== Arabic ===
At the time Malta was thoroughly Arabized, the conquerors brought to the island the vulgar (colloquial) variant of Arabic, not the classical one (Classical Arabic); therefore, the Maltese language differs from Classical Arabic in the same way as the Arabic dialects differ from Classical Arabic. The Maltese language also comprises a considerable number of Maghrebi features, but in other ways, it can be closer to other Arabic dialects, or closer to Classical Arabic than to the other dialects as in the word ra ('to see'). While Arabic words represent roughly one-third of the Maltese lexicon, they comprise most of the language's core vocabulary, as well as most of its most frequently used words.

Żammit (2000) found that 40% of a sample of 1,821 Quranic Arabic roots were found in Maltese, considerably lower than that found in the Moroccan (58%) and Lebanese (72%) varieties of Arabic. An analysis of the etymology of the 41,000 words in Aquilina's Maltese–English Dictionary shows that 32% of the Maltese vocabulary is of Arabic origin. Usually, words expressing basic concepts and ideas, such as raġel (man), mara (woman), tifel (boy), dar (house), xemx (sun), and sajf (summer), are of Arabic origin. Moreover, belles-lettres in Maltese aim to maximise their use of vocabulary belonging to this group.

Maltese	Tunisian	Moroccan	Egyptian	Hejazi	Standard Arabic	English
iva (ijwa, ija, iwa)	ey, ih, īwah, ayh, aywāh, aywāš	iyeh	aywa	īwa	نعم (naʕam)	yes
fejn	fīn, fayn, wīn, wayn	fīn, wīn	fēn	fēn	أين ('ayn)	where
xiex	š'ēš, ešnu, šnu	šnu, 'āš	'ēh	'ēš	ماذا (māḏā)	what
għaliex	ʕlēš, lēš, ʕlēh, lēh	ʕlāš, ʕlayāš	lēh	lēš	لماذا (limāḏā)	why
ġewwa	wost, l-dēkhel	el-dāḵil	gowwa	juwwa	داخل (dāḵil)	inside
barra	barra	barra	barra	barra	خارج (ḵārij)	outside
ġab	jēb	jāb	gāb	jāb	أحضر ('aḥḍara), جاء بـ (jā'a bi-)	to bring
saqsa, staqsa*	saqsa	saqṣa, sāl	sa'al	sa'al	سأل (sa'ala)	to ask
raqad	rqad, nanni	nʕas, rqad	nām	nām, ragad	نام (nāma), رقد (raqada)	to sleep
ra	ra, šēf	šāf	šāf	šāf	رأى (ra'ā)	to see
ried, xtaq**	ḥabb	ḥabb, bḡa	ʕāyez	biḡi	أراد ('arāda)	to want
ħdax	ḥdēš	ḥdāš	ḥidāšar	iḥdaʕaš	أَحَدَ عَشَرَ ('aḥada ʕašara)	eleven
tnax	ṭnāš	tnāš	itnašar	iṭnaʕaš	اِثْنَا عَشَرَ (iṯnā ʕašara)	twelve

Notes: * from Arabic استقصى (istaqṣā) "to investigate", ** from Arabic اشتاق (ištāqa) "to yearn for ".

The following table compares additional cognates in Maltese and some other varieties of Arabic (all forms are written phonetically, as in the source):

Maltese	Tunisian	Cairene	Damascene	Iraqi	Negev (bedouin)	Yemenite (Sanaani)	Moroccan	Standard Arabic	English
qalb /ʔalp/	qalb	'alb	'aleb	galeb	galb	galb	qalb	قلب (qalb) /qalb/	heart
waqt /waʔt/	waqt	wa't	wa'et	waket	wagt	wagt	waqt	وقت (waqt) /waqt/	time
qamar /ʔamar/	qmar	'amar	'amar	qamar	gumar	gamar	qmar	قمر (qamar) /qamar/	moon
kelb /kelp/	kalb	kalb	kaleb	čaleb	čalb	kalb	kalb	كلب (kalb) /kalb/	dog

Siculo-Arabic dialect which was spoken in Sicily and Malta is the ancestor of the Maltese language, some Siculo-Arabic words are still used in modern Sicilian (a Romance language spoken in Sicily):

Maltese	Siculo-Arabic (in Sicilian)	Arabic text	English
bebbuxu	babbaluci	ببوش (babbūš) (a Berber word)	snail
ġiebja	gebbia	جابية (jābiya)	cistern
ġunġlien	giuggiulena	جلجلان (juljulān)	sesame seed
sieqja	saia	ساقية (sāqiya)	canal
kenur	tannura	تنور (tannūr)	oven
żagħfran	zaffarana	زعفران (zaʿfarān)	saffron
żahra (less common than fjura, borrowed from Sicilian)	zagara	زهرة (zahra)	blossom
żbib	zibbibbu	زبيب (zabīb)	raisins
zokk (borrowed through Sicilian)	zuccu	ساق (sāq)	tree trunk
tebut	tabbutu	تابوت (tābūt)	coffin

The Maltese language has merged many of the original Arabic consonants (in particular the emphatic consonants) with others common to European languages. Thus, original Arabic /d/, /ð/, and /dˤ/ all merged into Maltese /d/. The vowels, meanwhile, separated from the three in Classical Arabic (/a i u/) into five, as is more typical of many European languages (/a ɛ i o u/). Some unstressed short vowels have been elided. The common Arabic greeting as salāmu 'alaykum is cognate with is-sliem għalikom in Maltese (lit. "the peace for you", peace be with you), as are similar greetings in other Semitic languages (e.g. shalom ʿalekhem in Hebrew).

=== Romance (Sicilian, Italian, Spanish and French) ===
An analysis of the etymology of the 41,000 words in Aquilina's Maltese–English Dictionary shows that words of Romance origin make up 52% of the Maltese vocabulary, although other sources report percentages between 40% and 62%. Romance vocabulary tends to deal with more complex concepts. Most words come from Sicilian and thus exhibit Sicilian phonetic characteristics, such as /u/ rather than Italian /o/, and /i/ rather than Italian /e/ (e.g. tiatru not teatro and fidi not fede). Also, as with Old Sicilian, /ʃ/ (English sh) is written x and this produces spellings such as: ambaxxata /ambaʃːaːta/ ('embassy'), xena /ʃeːna/ ('scene'; compare Italian ambasciata, scena).

Maltese	Sicilian	Italian	English
skola	scola	scuola	school
gvern	cuvernu	governo	government
repubblika	ripùbblica	repubblica	republic
re	re	re	king (Germanic)
natura	natura	natura	nature
pulizija	pulizzìa	polizia	police
ċentru	centru	centro	centre
teatru	tiatru	teatro	theatre

A tendency in modern Maltese is to adopt further influences from English and Italian. Complex Latinate English words adopted into Maltese are often given Italian or Sicilian forms, even if the resulting words do not appear in either of those languages. For instance, the words evaluation, industrial action, and chemical armaments become evalwazzjoni, azzjoni industrjali, and armamenti kimiċi in Maltese, while the Italian terms are valutazione, vertenza sindacale, and armi chimiche respectively. (The origin of the terms may be narrowed even further to British English; the phrase industrial action is meaningless in the United States.) This is comparable to the situation with English borrowings into the Italo-Australian dialect. English words of Germanic origin are generally preserved relatively unchanged.

Some influences of African Romance on the Arabic and Berber spoken in the Maghreb are theorised; these may then have passed into Maltese. For example, in calendar month names, the word furar 'February' is only found in the Maghreb and in Maltese – proving the word's ancient pedigree. The region also has a form of another Latin month in awi/ussu < augustus. This word does not appear to be a loan word through Arabic, and may have been taken over directly from Late Latin or African Romance. Scholars theorise that a Latin-based system provided forms such as awi/ussu and furar in African Romance, with the system then mediating Latin/Romance names through Arabic for some month names during the Islamic period. The same situation exists for Maltese which mediated words from Italian, and retains both non-Italian forms such as awissu/awwissu and frar, and Italian forms such as april.

=== Berber ===
Like the Maghrebi Arabic dialects, Maltese has a significant vocabulary derived from Berber languages. Whether these words entered Maltese by being inherited from Siculo-Arabic or were directly borrowed from Berber languages is not yet known. These include:

Maltese	Berber languages	English
gremxula	azrem ašal, lit. 'land worm', (Kabyle)	lizard
fekruna	fakrūn (Tunisian Arabic), tifakrunin (Jerbi), ifekran (Tashelhiyt), ifkran (Kabyle)	turtle
geddum	aqadum, lit. 'face, frown' (Kabyle)	chin
gendus	gandūz, lit. 'young calf' (Jerbi)	ox, bull
gerżuma	ageržum (Mozabite, Tashelhiyt)	throat
tfief	tilfaf (Ouargli), tifāf, tilfāf, tiffāf (Tarifit)	sow thistle (Sonchus oleraceus)
tengħud	talaɣūda (Tunisian Arabic), telɣūda (Algerian Arabic)	spurge (Euphorbia)
kosksu	kuskesu, kuskus (Kabyle)	couscous, small round pasta
fartas	aferḍas (Ouargli, Kabyle)	bald
għaffeġ	‘affež (Algerian Arabic), effeẓ (Ouargli, Mozabite)	to crush, to squash
żrinġ	tažrant (Jerbi)	frog
żrar	zrar (Mozabite, Ouargli), azrar (Kabyle, Nafusi)	gravel
werżieq	wárẓag (Mrazig)	cicada, lit. screamer, shrieker
buqexrem	buqišrem (Kabyle)	vervain (Verbena officinalis)
fidloqqom	fudalɣem (Kabyle)	borage (Borago officinalis)
żorr	uzur (Kabyle), uzzur (Tarifit)	rude, arrogant
lellex	lelleš (Mozabite)	to shine, to glitter
pespes	bbesbes (Ouargli)	to whisper
teptep	ṭṭebṭeb (Ouargli)	to blink, to twinkle
webbel	webben (Mozabite)	to induce, to tempt

=== English ===
English loanwords, which are becoming increasingly common, can make up between 6% and 20% of the Maltese vocabulary. This percentage discrepancy is due to the fact that a number of new English loanwords are sometimes not considered part of the official Maltese vocabulary, hence they are not included in certain dictionaries. Also, English loanwords of Latinate origin are very often Italianised, as discussed above. English loanwords are generally transliterated, although standard English pronunciation is virtually always retained. Below are a few examples:

Maltese	English
futbol	football
baskitbol	basketball
klabb	club
friġġ	fridge
kompjuter	computer
kejk	cake

"Fridge" is a common shortening of "refrigerator". "Refrigerator" is a Latinate word which could be imported into Maltese as rifriġeratur, whereas the Italian word is frigorifero or refrigeratore.

=== Calendar ===
The days of the week (Maltese: jiem il-ġimgħa) in Maltese, which are derived from Arabic, are referred to by number which is also typical in other Semitic languages, Days of the week are commonly preceded by the word nhar meaning 'day'.

English	Maltese	Literal
Sunday	Il-Ħadd	first [day]
Monday	It-Tnejn	second [day]
Tuesday	It-Tlieta	third [day]
Wednesday	L-Erbgħa	fourth [day]
Thursday	Il-Ħamis	fifth [day]
Friday	Il-Ġimgħa	gathering [day]
Saturday	Is-Sibt	Sabbath [day]

The months of the year (Maltese: xhur is-sena) in Maltese are mostly derived from Sicilian, though Frar and Awwissu may be derived from African Romance via Siculo-Arabic.

English	Maltese
January	Jannar
February	Frar
March	Marzu
April	April
May	Mejju
June	Ġunju
July	Lulju
August	Awwissu
September	Settembru
October	Ottubru
November	Novembru
December	Diċembru

=== Time ===
English	Maltese
today	illum
yesterday	ilbieraħ
tomorrow	għada
second	sekonda
minute	minuta (archaic: dqiqa)
hour	siegħa
day	jum or ġurnata
week	ġimgħa
month	xahar
year	sena

=== Question words ===
English	Maltese	Example	Translation
What (standalone)	Xiex	Xiex?	What?
What (preceding)	X'	X' għamilt?	What did you do?
Who	Min	Min hu dak?	Who is he?
How	Kif	Kif inti llum?	How are you today?
Where	Fejn	Fejn sejjer?	Where are you going?
Where (from)	Mnejn / Minn fejn	Mnejn ġie?	Where did he come from?
Why	Għala, Għaliex, Għalxiex, Ilgħala	Għala telaq?	Why did he leave?
Which	Liem, Liema	Liem wieħed hu tajjeb?	Which one is good?
When	Meta	Meta ħa titlaq?	When will you leave?
How Much	Kemm	Kemm jiswa dan?	How much does this cost?

=== Sample phrases ===
English	Maltese
Hello.	Ħelow.
Yes.	Iva.
Yes, please.	Iva, jekk jogħġbok.
No.	Le.
No thanks.	Le, grazzi.
Please.	Jekk jogħġbok.
Thank you.	Grazzi.
Thank you very much.	Grazzi ħafna.
You're welcome.	M'hemmx imniex.
I'd like a coffee please.	Nixtieq kafè, jekk jogħġbok.
Two beers please.	Żewġ birer, jekk jogħġbok.
Cheers!	Saħħa!
Excuse me.	Skużani.
What time is it?	X'ħin hu?
Can you repeat that please?	Tista' tirrepeti jekk jogħġbok?
Please speak more slowly.	Jekk jogħġbok tkellem iktar bil-mod.
I don't understand.	Mhux qed nifhem / Ma fhimtx.
Sorry.	Skużani.
Where are the toilets?	Fejn huma t-toilets?
How much does this cost?	Kemm jiswa dan? / Kemm tiswa din?
Welcome!	Merħba!
Good morning.	L-għodwa t-tajba / Bonġu.
Good afternoon.	Il-waranofsinhar it-tajjeb.
Good evening.	Is-serata t-tajba. / Bonswa
Goodnight.	Il-lejl it-tajjeb. / Il-lejla t-tajba
Goodbye.	Saħħa / Ċaw.

== Grammar ==
Maltese grammar is fundamentally derived from Arabic, although Latin and English noun pluralisation patterns are also used on borrowed words.

=== Adjectives and adverbs ===
Adjectives follow nouns. There are no separately formed native adverbs, and word order is fairly flexible. Both nouns and adjectives of Semitic origin take the definite article (for example, It-tifel il-kbir, lit. "The boy the elder"="The elder boy"). This rule does not apply to adjectives of Romance origin.

=== Nouns ===
Nouns are pluralised and also have a dual marker. Semitic plurals are complex; if they are regular (sħaħ), they are marked by -iet/-ijiet, e.g., art, artijiet "lands (territorial possessions or property)" (cf. Arabic -at and Hebrew -ot/-oth) or -in (cf. Arabic -īn and Hebrew -im). If irregular, they fall in the 'plural miksur' (broken plural) category, in which a word is pluralised by internal vowel changes: ktieb, kotba" book", "books"; raġel, irġiel "man", "men". Some nouns can also take both kinds of plurals, like bieb (door) = bwieb, bibien, triq (road) = toroq, triqat, and tazza (cup) = tazzez, tazzi.

Words of Romance origin are usually pluralised in two manners: addition of -i or -jiet . For example, lingwa, lingwi "languages", from Sicilian lingua, lingui.

Words of English origin are pluralised by adding either an "-s" or "-jiet", for example, friġġ, friġis from the word fridge. Some words can be pluralised with either of the suffixes to denote the plural. A few words borrowed from English can amalgamate both suffixes, like brikksa from the English brick, which can adopt either collective form brikks or the plural form brikksiet. Interestingly, some nouns of English origins still take Semitic plurals, like senter (gun) coming from 'centre', takes the plural snieter, like in ħanut (shop) = ħwienet, although it is no longer done with new loanwords.

==== Derivation ====
As in Arabic, nouns are often derived by changing, adding or removing the vowels within a triliteral root. These are some of the patterns used for nouns:

- CaCiC – xadin (monkey), sadid (rust)
- CCiC – żbib (raisin), ġbid (pulling)
- CaCCa – baqra (cow), basla (onion)
- CeCCa – werqa (leaf), xewqa (wish)
- CoCCa – borka (wild duck), forka (gallows)
- CaCC – qalb (heart), sajd (fishing)
- CeCC – kelb (dog), xemx (sun)
- CCuCija – tfulija (childhood), xbubija (maidenhood)
- CCuCa – rtuba (softness), bjuda (whiteness)
- CaCCaC – tallab (beggar), bajjad (whitewasher)

The so-called mimated nouns (nomi mimmati) use the prefix m- in addition to vowel changes. This pattern can be used to indicate place names, tools, abstractions, etc. These are some of the patterns used for mimated nouns:

- ma-CCeC – marden (spindle)
- mi-CCeC – minkeb (elbow), miżwed (pod)
- mu-CCaC – musmar (nail), munqar (beak)

=== Article ===
The proclitic il- is the definite article, equivalent to "the" in English and "al-" in Arabic.

The Maltese article becomes l- before or after a vowel.

- l-omm (the mother)
- rajna l-Papa (we saw the Pope)
- il-missier (the father)

The Maltese article assimilates to a following non-ġ coronal consonant (called konsonanti xemxin "sun consonants"), namely:

- Ċ iċ-ċikkulata (the chocolate)
- D id-dar (the house)
- N in-nar (the fire)
- R ir-razzett (the farm)
- S is-serrieq (the saw)
- T it-tifel (the child)
- X ix-xemx (the sun)
- Ż iż-żarbuna (the shoe)
- Z iz-zalzett (the sausage)

=== Verbs ===
Verbs show the Semitic triliteral pattern, in which a verb is conjugated with prefixes, suffixes, and infixes (for example ktibna, Arabic katabna, Hebrew kathabhnu (Modern Hebrew: katavnu) "we wrote"). An example is the Semitic root X-M-X ('sun'), for example xemx (sun), xmux (suns), xemxi (sunny), xemxata (sunstroke), nixxemmex (I sunbathe), ma xxemmixtx (I didn't sunbathe), tixmix (the act of sunbathing).

Maltese also features the agglutination of verb suffixes indicating direction of action, for example agħmilhomli "make them for me"← agħmel "make" in the imperative + hom from huma "them" + li suffix indicating first person singular and ħaslitielu "she washed it for him"←ħaslet "she washed" from the verb ħasel "to wash" + ie the object + lu suffix indicating third person masculine singular.

The two tenses are present and perfect. The Maltese verb system incorporates Romance verbs and adds Maltese suffixes and prefixes to them, for example; iddeċidejna "we decided" ← (i)ddeċieda "decide", a Romance verb + -ejna, a Maltese first person plural perfect marker. There is no infinitive in Maltese, yet something similar called the mamma is used, where the 3rd person male perfect singular is considered the root where the consonants are used to form the root (l-għerq), and the verb form found in dictionaries.

In order to make a future sentence, we use the present tense with the addition of ħa or sejjer (conjugated, abbreviated to se or ser for simplicity). Ex. Għada ħa mmur naħsel il-ħwejjeġ (tomorrow I'll go wash my clothes).

== Media ==
As Malta is a multilingual country, the use of Maltese in the mass media is shared with other European languages, namely English and Italian. The majority of television stations broadcast from Malta in English or Maltese, although broadcasts from Italy in Italian are also received on the islands. Similarly, there are more Maltese-language radio programs than English ones broadcast from Malta, but again, Italian broadcasts are also picked up. Coverage in newspaper periodicals is generally equally split between Maltese and English.

Maltese is little used on the internet and few websites are written in the language. In a survey of Maltese cultural websites conducted in 2004 on behalf of the Maltese government, 12 of 13 were in English only and the remaining one was multilingual but did not include Maltese. In 2011, only 6.5 per cent of Maltese internet users reported employing Maltese online, which may be a consequence of the lack of online support for the language.

== Code-switching ==
The Maltese population, being fluent in both Maltese and English, displays code-switching (referred to as Maltenglish) in certain localities and between certain social groups.

== See also ==
- Languages of Malta
- Maltese people
