= British English =

Set of varieties of English language

- Native to: United Kingdom (originally England)
- Region: British Isles
- Ethnicity: British people
- Language family: Indo-European: Germanic; West Germanic; North Sea Germanic; Anglo-Frisian; Anglic; English; British English
- Early forms: Proto-English: Old English; Middle English; Early Modern English
- Standard forms: Received Pronunciation (not covering spelling and grammar); Oxford Spelling (recognised by the United Nations)
- Dialects: English language in England; Scottish English; Welsh English; Ulster English; Hiberno-English; Bermudian English; Falkland Islands English; Cayman Islands English; Gibraltarian English; Manx English; Channel Island English; Maltese English
- Writing system: Latin (English alphabet); Unified English Braille

Official status
- Official language in: United Nations (with Oxford spelling)
- Regulated by: British Council

Language codes
- ISO 639-3: –
- IETF: en-GB

British English (Note: Abbreviations: BrE, en-GB, and BE) is the set of varieties of the English language native to the United Kingdom, especially Great Britain. (Note: The Oxford English Dictionary applies the term to English as "spoken or written in the British Isles; esp[ecially] the forms of English usual in Great Britain", reserving "Irish English" for the "English language as spoken and written in Ireland". Others, such as the Cambridge Academic Content Dictionary, define it as the "English language as it is spoken and written in England".) More narrowly, it can refer specifically to the English language in England, or, more broadly, to the collective dialects of English throughout the United Kingdom taken as a single umbrella variety, for instance additionally incorporating Scottish English, Welsh English, and Northern Irish English. Tom McArthur in the Oxford Guide to World English acknowledges that British English shares "all the ambiguities and tensions [with] the word 'British' and as a result can be used and interpreted in two ways, more broadly or more narrowly, within a range of blurring and ambiguity".

Variations exist in formal (both written and spoken) English in the United Kingdom. For example, the adjective wee is almost exclusively used in parts of Scotland, north-east England, Northern Ireland, Ireland, and occasionally Yorkshire, whereas the adjective little is predominant elsewhere. Nevertheless, there is a meaningful degree of uniformity in written English within the United Kingdom, and this could be described by the term British English. The forms of spoken English, however, vary considerably more than in most other areas of the world where English is spoken and so a uniform concept of British English is more difficult to apply to the spoken language.

Globally, countries that are former British colonies or members of the Commonwealth tend to follow British English, as is the case for English used by European Union institutions. The United Nations also uses British English with Oxford spelling. In China, both British English and American English are taught. The British government actively teaches and promotes English around the world through the British Council, which operates in more than 100 countries.

== History ==
=== Origins ===
English is a West Germanic language that originated from the Anglo-Frisian dialects brought to Britain by Germanic settlers from various parts of what is now north‑west Germany and the northern Netherlands. The resident population at this time generally spoke Common Brittonic – the insular variety of Continental Celtic, which had been influenced by the Roman occupation. This group of languages (Welsh, Cornish, and Cumbric) co‑existed alongside English into the modern period, but due to their remoteness from the Germanic languages, their influence on English was notably limited. However, the degree of influence remains debated, and it has recently been argued that grammatical influence from Brittonic accounts for the substantial innovations that distinguish English from the other West Germanic languages.

Initially, Old English was a diverse group of dialects, reflecting the varied origins of the Anglo-Saxon kingdoms of England. One of these dialects, Late West Saxon, eventually came to dominate. Original Old English was then influenced by two waves of invasion: the first was by speakers of the Scandinavian branch of the Germanic family, who settled in parts of Britain in the eighth and ninth centuries; the second was by the Normans in the 11th century, who spoke Old Norman and ultimately developed an English variety of it called Anglo-Norman. These two invasions caused English to become 'mixed' to some degree (though it was never a truly mixed language in the strictest sense of the word; mixed languages arise from the cohabitation of speakers of different languages, who develop a hybrid tongue for basic communication).

The more idiomatic, concrete, and descriptive English is, the more it derives from Anglo‑Saxon origins. The more intellectual and abstract English is, the more it contains Latin and French influences. For example, swine (like the Germanic Schwein) is the animal in the field, bred by the occupied Anglo‑Saxons, while pork (like the French porc) is the animal on the table, eaten by the occupying Normans. Another example is the Anglo‑Saxon cū meaning 'cow', and the French bœuf meaning 'beef'.

Cohabitation with the Scandinavians resulted in significant grammatical simplification and lexical enrichment of the Anglo-Frisian core of English. The later Norman occupation led to the grafting onto that Germanic core of a more elaborate layer of words from the Romance branch of European languages. This Norman influence entered English largely through the courts and government. Thus, English developed into a 'borrowing' language of great flexibility and with a very large vocabulary.

== Dialects ==
Dialects and accents vary amongst the four countries of the United Kingdom, as well as within the countries themselves.

The major divisions are normally classified as English English (or English as spoken in England, which is itself broadly grouped into Southern English, West Country, East and West Midlands English and Northern English), Northern Irish English (in Northern Ireland), Welsh English (not to be confused with the Welsh language), and Scottish English (not to be confused with the Scots language or Scottish Gaelic). Each group includes a range of dialects, some markedly different from others. The various British dialects also differ in the words that they have borrowed from other languages.

Around the middle of the 15th century, there were points where within the 5 major dialects there were almost 500 ways to spell the word though.

=== Research ===
Following its last major Survey of English Dialects (1949–1950), the University of Leeds has started work on a new project. In May 2007, the Arts and Humanities Research Council awarded a grant to the University of Leeds to study British regional dialects.

The team (Note: In British English collective nouns may be either singular or plural, according to context. An example provided by Partridge is: " 'The committee of public safety is to consider the matter', but 'the committee of public safety quarrel regarding their next chairman' ...Thus...singular when...a unit is intended; plural when the idea of plurality is predominant". BBC television news and The Guardian style guide follow Partridge but other sources, such as BBC Online and The Times style guides, recommend a strict noun-verb agreement with the collective noun always governing the verb conjugated in the singular. BBC radio news, however, insists on the plural verb. Partridge, Eric (1947) Usage and Abusage: "Collective Nouns". Allen, John (2003) BBC News style guide, page 31.) is sifting through a large collection of examples of regional slang words and phrases uncovered by the 'Voices' project run by the BBC, in which the public was invited to send in examples of English still spoken throughout the country. The BBC Voices project also collected hundreds of news articles about how the British speak English – from swearing to items on language schools. This information will also be collated and analysed by Professor Johnson's team, both for content and for the location from which it was reported. "Perhaps the most remarkable finding in the Voices study is that the English language is as diverse as ever, despite our increased mobility and constant exposure to other accents and dialects through TV and radio." When discussing the award of the grant in 2007, the University of Leeds stated:

that it was "very pleased" – and indeed, "well chuffed" – at receiving the generous grant. The university could, of course, have been "bostin" if it had come from the Black Country, or if it were a Scouser it would have been well "made up" over so many spondoolicks, because, as a Geordie might say, £460,000 is a "canny load of chink".

=== English regional ===
Most people in Britain speak with a regional accent or dialect. However, about 2% of Britons speak with an accent called Received Pronunciation (also known as 'the King's English', 'Oxford English' or 'BBC English'), which is essentially region‑less. It derives from a mixture of Midlands and Southern dialects spoken in London in the early modern period. It is frequently used as a model for teaching English to foreign learners.

In the South East, there are significantly different accents: the Cockney accent spoken by some East Londoners is strikingly different from Received Pronunciation (RP). Cockney rhyming slang can be (and was initially intended to be) difficult for outsiders to understand, although the extent of its use is often exaggerated.

Londoners speak with a mixture of accents, depending on ethnicity, neighbourhood, class, age, upbringing and various other factors. Estuary English has been gaining prominence in recent decades: it has some features of RP and some of Cockney. Immigrants to the UK in recent decades have brought many more languages to the country, and particularly to London. Surveys started in 1979 by the Inner London Education Authority discovered more than 125 languages being spoken domestically by the families of inner‑city schoolchildren. Notably, Multicultural London English – a sociolect that emerged in the late 20th century – is spoken mainly by young, working‑class people in multicultural parts of London.

Since the mass internal migration to Northamptonshire in the 1940s, and given its position between several major accent regions, the county has become a source of various accent developments. In Northampton, the older accent has been influenced by overspill from London. There is an accent known locally as the Kettering accent, which is a transitional accent between the East Midlands and East Anglian. It is the last southern Midlands accent to use the broad 'a' in words such as bath or grass (i.e. barth or grarss). Conversely, crass or plastic use a slender 'a'. A few miles to the north‑west, in Leicestershire, the slender 'a' becomes more widespread generally. In the town of Corby, five miles (8 km) to the north, one finds the Corbyite dialect, which – unlike the Kettering accent – is largely influenced by the West Scottish accent.

== Features ==
Phonological features characteristic of British English revolve around the pronunciation of the letter R, as well as the dental plosive T and some diphthongs specific to this dialect.

=== T-glottalling ===
Once regarded as a Cockney feature, in a number of forms of spoken British English, /t/ has become commonly realised as a glottal stop [ʔ] when it is in intervocalic position, in a process called T-glottalisation. National media, being based in London, have seen the glottal stop spreading more widely than it once was in word endings, not being heard as "no[ʔ]" and bottle of water being heard as "bo[ʔ]le of wa[ʔ]er". It is still stigmatised when used in word‑medial positions, such as later. Other consonants subject to this usage in Cockney English are p, as in pa[ʔ]er, and k, as in ba[ʔ]er.

=== R-dropping ===
In most areas of England and Wales, outside the West Country and other nearby counties of the UK, the consonant R is not pronounced if not followed by a vowel, lengthening the preceding vowel instead. This phenomenon is known as non‑rhoticity. In these same areas, a tendency exists to insert an R between a word ending in a vowel and the next word beginning with a vowel. This is called the intrusive R. It can be understood as a merger, in that words that once ended in an R and words that did not are no longer treated differently. This is also due to London‑centric influences. Examples of R‑dropping are car and sugar, where the R is not pronounced.

=== Diphthongisation ===
British dialects differ on the extent of diphthongisation of long vowels, with southern varieties extensively turning them into diphthongs, and with northern dialects normally preserving many of them. As a comparison, North American varieties could be said to be in‑between.

==== North ====
Long vowels /iː/ and /uː/ are usually preserved, and in several areas also /oː/ and /eː/, as in go and say (unlike other varieties of English, which change them to [oʊ] and [eɪ] respectively). Some areas go as far as not diphthongising medieval /iː/ and /uː/, which give rise to modern /aɪ/ and /aʊ/. That is, for example, in the traditional accent of Newcastle upon Tyne, 'out' will sound like 'oot', and in parts of Scotland and North‑West England, 'my' will be pronounced as 'me'.

==== South ====
Long vowels /iː/ and /uː/ are diphthongised to [ɪi] and [ʊu] respectively (or, more technically, [ʏʉ], with a raised tongue), so that ee and oo in feed and food are pronounced with a movement. The diphthong [oʊ] is also pronounced with a greater movement, normally [əʊ], [əʉ] or [əɨ].

=== Collective nouns ===
The tendency to drop morphological grammatical number agreement in collective nouns is stronger in British English than in North American English. This means treating them as plural even when they are grammatically singular, when a perceived natural number prevails – especially when applying to institutional nouns and groups of people.

The noun 'police', for example, undergoes this treatment:

Police are investigating the theft of work tools worth £500 from a van at the Sprucefield park and ride car park in Lisburn.

A sports team can be treated likewise:

Arsenal have lost just one of 20 home Premier League matches against Manchester City.

This tendency can be observed in texts produced as early as the 19th century. For example, Jane Austen, a British author, writes in Chapter 4 of Pride and Prejudice, published in 1813:

All the world are good and agreeable in your eyes.

However, in Chapter 16, the grammatical singular is used:

The world is blinded by his fortune and consequence.

=== Negatives ===
Some dialects of British English use negative concord, also known as double negatives. Rather than changing a word or using a positive form, words such as nobody, not, nothing, and never are used within the same sentence. While this does not occur in Standard English, it does occur in non‑standard dialects. Double negation involves two different morphemes: one that triggers the double negation, and another that is associated with the point or the verb.

== Standard British English ==
Standard English in the United Kingdom, as in other English‑speaking nations, is widely enforced in schools and by social norms for formal contexts, but not by any single authority. For instance, there is no institution equivalent to the Académie française for French or the Royal Spanish Academy for Spanish. Standard British English differs notably in certain vocabulary, grammar, and pronunciation features from standard American English and from certain other standard English varieties around the world. British and American spelling also differ in minor ways.

The accent, or pronunciation system, of standard British English – based in south‑eastern England – has been known for more than a century as Received Pronunciation (RP). However, due to language evolution and changing social trends, some linguists argue that RP is losing prestige or has been replaced by another accent – one that the linguist Geoff Lindsey, for instance, calls 'Standard Southern British English'. Other scholars suggest that more regionally oriented standard accents are emerging in England. Outside England – namely in Scotland and Northern Ireland – RP exerts very little influence, particularly in the 21st century. RP, while long established as the standard English accent around the globe due to the spread of the British Empire, is distinct from the standard English pronunciation in some parts of the world; most prominently, RP notably contrasts with standard North American accents.

As of the 21st century, dictionaries such as the Oxford English Dictionary, the Longman Dictionary of Contemporary English, the Chambers Dictionary, and the Collins Dictionary record actual usage rather than attempting to prescribe it. In addition, vocabulary and usage change with time: words are freely borrowed from other languages and from other varieties of English, and neologisms are frequent.

=== History of standardisation ===
For historical reasons dating back to the rise of London in the ninth century, the form of language spoken in London and the East Midlands became standard English within the Court, and ultimately became the basis for generally accepted use in law, government, literature, and education in Britain. The standardisation of British English is thought to stem from both dialect levelling and a perceived sense of social superiority. Speaking the standard dialect created class distinctions: those who did not speak standard English were considered of a lower class or social status, and were often discounted or regarded as having low intelligence. Another contribution to the standardisation of British English was the introduction of the printing press to England in the mid‑15th century. In doing so, William Caxton enabled a common language and spelling to be disseminated throughout England at a much faster rate.

Samuel Johnson's A Dictionary of the English Language (1755) was a major step in the English‑language spelling reform, in which the purification of language focused on standardising both speech and spelling. By the early 20th century, British authors had produced numerous books intended as guides to English grammar and usage, a few of which achieved sufficient acclaim to remain in print for long periods and to be reissued in new editions after several decades. These include, most notably, Fowler's Modern English Usage and The Complete Plain Words by Sir Ernest Gowers.

Detailed guidance on many aspects of writing British English for publication is included in style guides issued by various publishers, including The Times newspaper, the Oxford University Press, and the Cambridge University Press. The Oxford University Press guidelines were originally drafted as a single broadsheet page by Horace Henry Hart and were, at the time (1893), the first guide of their kind in English. They were gradually expanded and eventually published, first as Hart's Rules and, in 2002, as part of The Oxford Manual of Style. Comparable in authority and stature to The Chicago Manual of Style for published American English, the Oxford Manual is a fairly exhaustive standard for published British English that writers can consult in the absence of specific guidance from their publishing house.

== Relationship with Commonwealth English ==
British English is the basis of, and very similar to, Commonwealth English. Commonwealth English is English as spoken and written in the Commonwealth countries, though often with some local variation. This includes English spoken in Australia, Malta, New Zealand, Nigeria, and South Africa. It also includes South Asian English used in South Asia, English varieties in Southeast Asia, and parts of Africa. Canadian English is based on British English but has more influence from American English, and the two are often grouped together because of their close proximity. British English, for example, is the closest English to Indian English, but Indian English has additional vocabulary, and some English words are assigned different meanings.

== See also ==
- American English
- Australian English
- British Sign Language
- Canadian English
- Comparison of American and British English
- English in the Commonwealth of Nations
- Hiberno-English
- Newfoundland English
- New Zealand English
- South African English
