= List of Maltese-language poets =

This is a list of Maltese-language poets, together with some of their best-known poems.

== Poets ==
- Pietru Caxaro (died 1485) – The first noted Maltese poet
- Ġan Franġisk Bonamico (1639–1680)
- Gioacchino Navarro (1748–1813)
- Patri Fidiel, (c. 1762–1824)
- Mons. Ludovik Mifsud Tommasi (1796–1879) – Canon of the Collegiate of Cospicua
- Ġan Anton Vassallo (1817–1868)
- Ġużè Muscat Azzopardi (1853–1927)
- Manwel Dimech (1860–1921)
- Dun Karm Psaila (1871–1961)
- Rużar Briffa (1906–1963)
- Anton Buttigieg (1912–1983)
- Marjanu Vella (1927–1988)
- Pawlu Aquilina (born 1929)
- Rigu Bovingdon (born 1942)
- Joe Friggieri (born 1946)
- Oliver Friggieri (1947–2020)
- Ray Buttigieg (born 1955)
- Immanuel Mifsud (born 1967)
- Nadia Mifsud (born 1976)
- Claudia Gauci (born 1976)
- Clare Azzopardi (born 1977)
- Elizabeth Grech (born 1978)
- Leanne Ellul (born 1989)
- Elena Cardona (born ?)
