= Language Question (Malta) =

Language controversy in Malta in the 1800s and 1900s

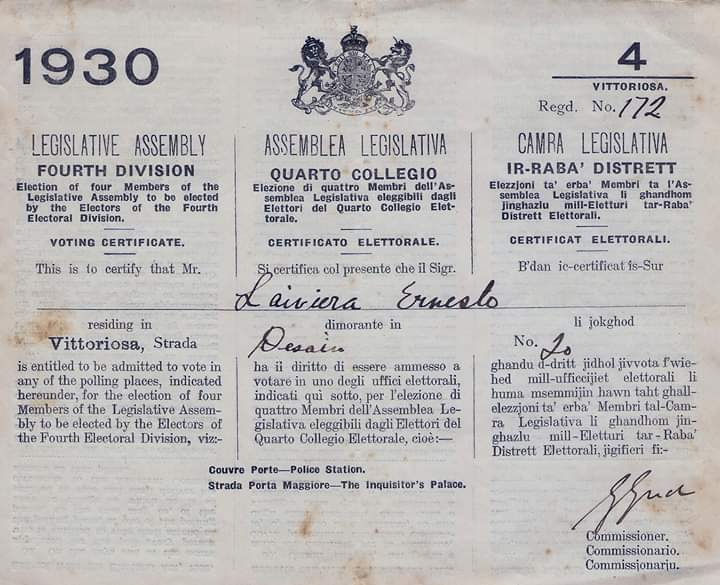
Trilingual voting document for the cancelled 1930 election, with text in English, Italian and Maltese

The Language Question (Maltese: Kwistjoni tal-Lingwa, Italian: Questione della lingua) was a linguistic and political controversy in the British colony of Malta which lasted from the early 19th to the mid-20th centuries. It began as a dispute over whether the dominant language on the islands should be English or Italian, and it ended with the native Maltese becoming an official language alongside English.

Before the Language Question, Malta was characterized by a diglossia in which Italian was the language of the elite and Maltese was the language spoken by the common people. The linguistic debate arose as a result of British attempts to introduce English into Maltese society, and in the meantime the Maltese language was gradually developed and formalized.

The debate became increasingly politicized after the 1880s, and political parties were established along linguistic lines. It remained a key factor in Maltese politics until World War II, and its impact on contemporary Malta remains significant.

== Background ==
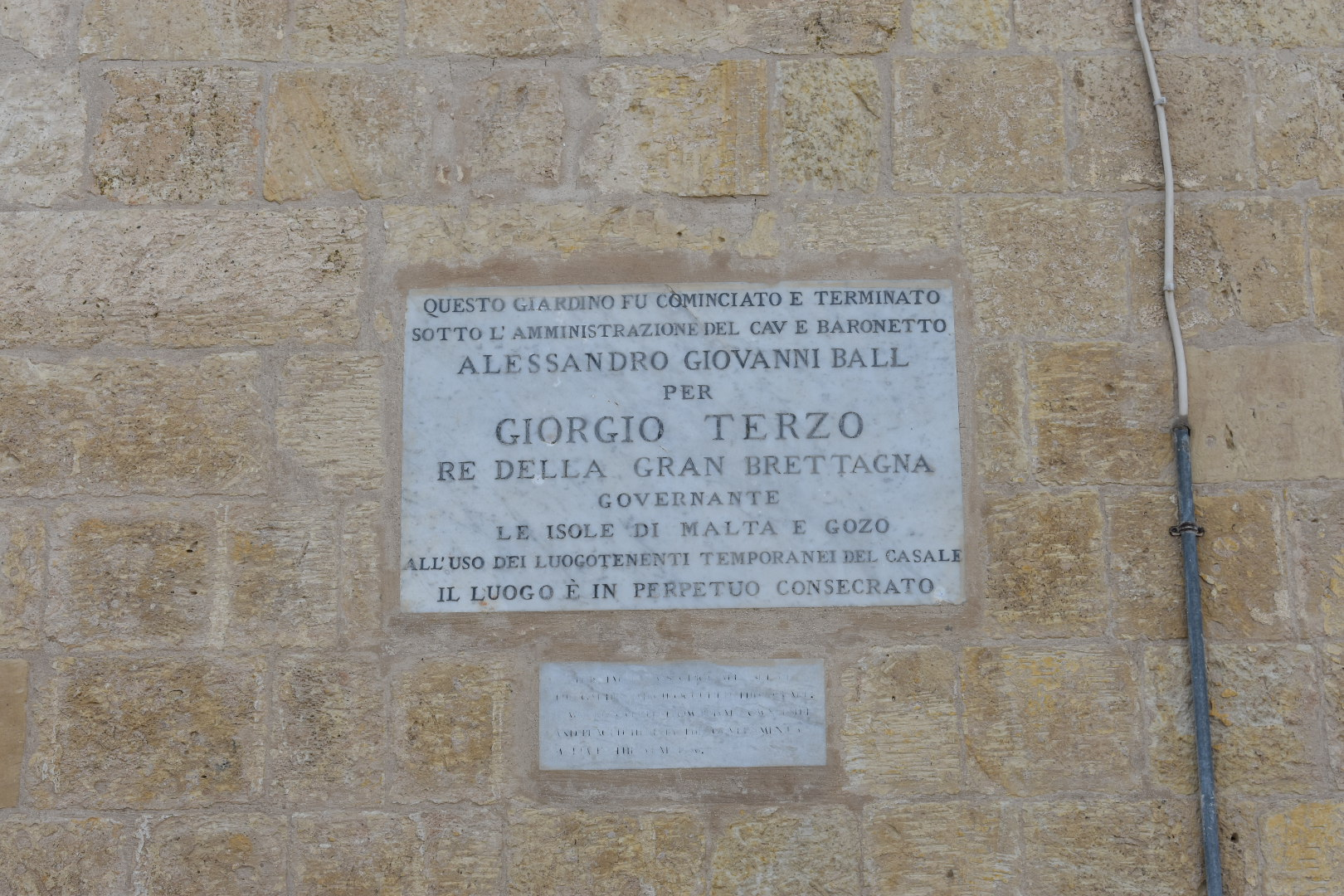
An early 19th century British colonial inscription from a garden in Żabbar written in Italian

The Language Question arose from the diglossia which developed in the Maltese Islands over the centuries. The islands' native language, Maltese, is a Semitic language which evolved from Siculo-Arabic, and historically it had a less prestigious status than other languages on the islands. Maltese was primarily a spoken language among the common people and it was not used in official contexts. When Malta was part of the Kingdom of Sicily in the medieval period, the most prestigious languages or acrolects were Latin and Sicilian. After Hospitaller rule was established in 1530, Italian (then known as volgare toscano) became the primary language used by the Hospitaller knights, and the Maltese middle class subsequently adopted Italian rather than Sicilian as their preferred language, while Latin continued to be used in official contexts and in education.

After France expelled the Hospitallers and occupied Malta in 1798, an attempt was made to introduce French into Maltese society and it became an official language, but this ceased after France surrendered Malta to the British in 1800. At the time, the islands were regarded by many as part of Italy, with British Civil Commissioner Alexander Ball referring to Malta's capital Valletta as "the most tranquill City in Italy." During the 19th century, British colonial authorities introduced English on the islands, resulting in disagreements between those who favoured English and those who favoured Italian. This dispute became known as the Language Question.

== Early attempts at Anglicization (1813–1880) ==
Malta became a de facto British crown colony in 1813, and Sir Thomas Maitland was appointed as its first Governor. This political change was confirmed de jure in the Treaty of Paris of 1814. Efforts to introduce English on the islands began around this time, and in 1813 Secretary of State for War and the Colonies Lord Henry Bathurst instructed Maitland that Italian should be replaced by English and that the latter should be promoted among the islands' inhabitants. This attempted Anglicization was opposed by many Maltese people, who held on to Italian culture and the Roman Catholic religion, which were distinguishing features compared to their Anglophone and Protestant rulers. Maitland and his successors did not follow Bathurst's instructions so as to prevent conflict with the Catholic Church.

Anglicization was also opposed by other members of Maltese society apart from the church, such as merchants who had strong commercial links with Sicily and mainland Italy. It had made little progress by the 1830s, and at that point Italian was still the language of instruction in the few schools present on the islands. After attempts to Anglicize the courts had failed, King William IV confirmed the status of Italian as an official language on legal documents in 1833, although Governor Henry Bouverie stated that English law should be introduced "at least in spirit" in 1837. An 1838 Royal Commission found that "the Italian language [was] far more useful to a Maltese than any other language, excepting his native tongue."

Despite this, a more subtle process of Anglicization took place throughout the course of the 19th century. Knowledge of English provided the Maltese with more employment opportunities, and this became more significant as trade between Britain and Malta increased. The colonial authorities continued to promote English but did not forcibly impose it on the population. In the late 1850s, knowledge of both English and Italian became necessary requirements for joining the civil service.

=== Role of Maltese and Arabic ===
Initially the Maltese language did not play a prominent role in the linguistic debate on Malta, since it was regarded by many as a vernacular corrupted dialect of Arabic. In 1822, John Hookham Frere created a chair of Maltese at the University of Malta for Mikiel Anton Vassalli and he suggested that the language (written in both the Arabic and Latin scripts) be taught in primary schools, although little progress was made in this regard. Significant developments in Maltese literature began in the 1820s and increased after freedom of the press was established in 1839. Pamphlets, journals, poems and novels were published by writers such as Ġan Anton Vassallo and Ġużè Muscat Azzopardi. These changes led to the standardization of Maltese and they contributed to it being recognized as a language in its own right rather than an Arabic dialect.

In the 1840s George Percy Badger supported the idea that Arabic and English, rather than Maltese or Italian, should be taught to the Maltese population. The proposal to reintroduce Arabic failed to gain any support among the Maltese people, and a group called Accademia Filologica Maltese was established in opposition. This promoted the use of Maltese in literature and education, whilst also recognizing the diglossia with Italian.

=== British fears of Italian and French influence ===
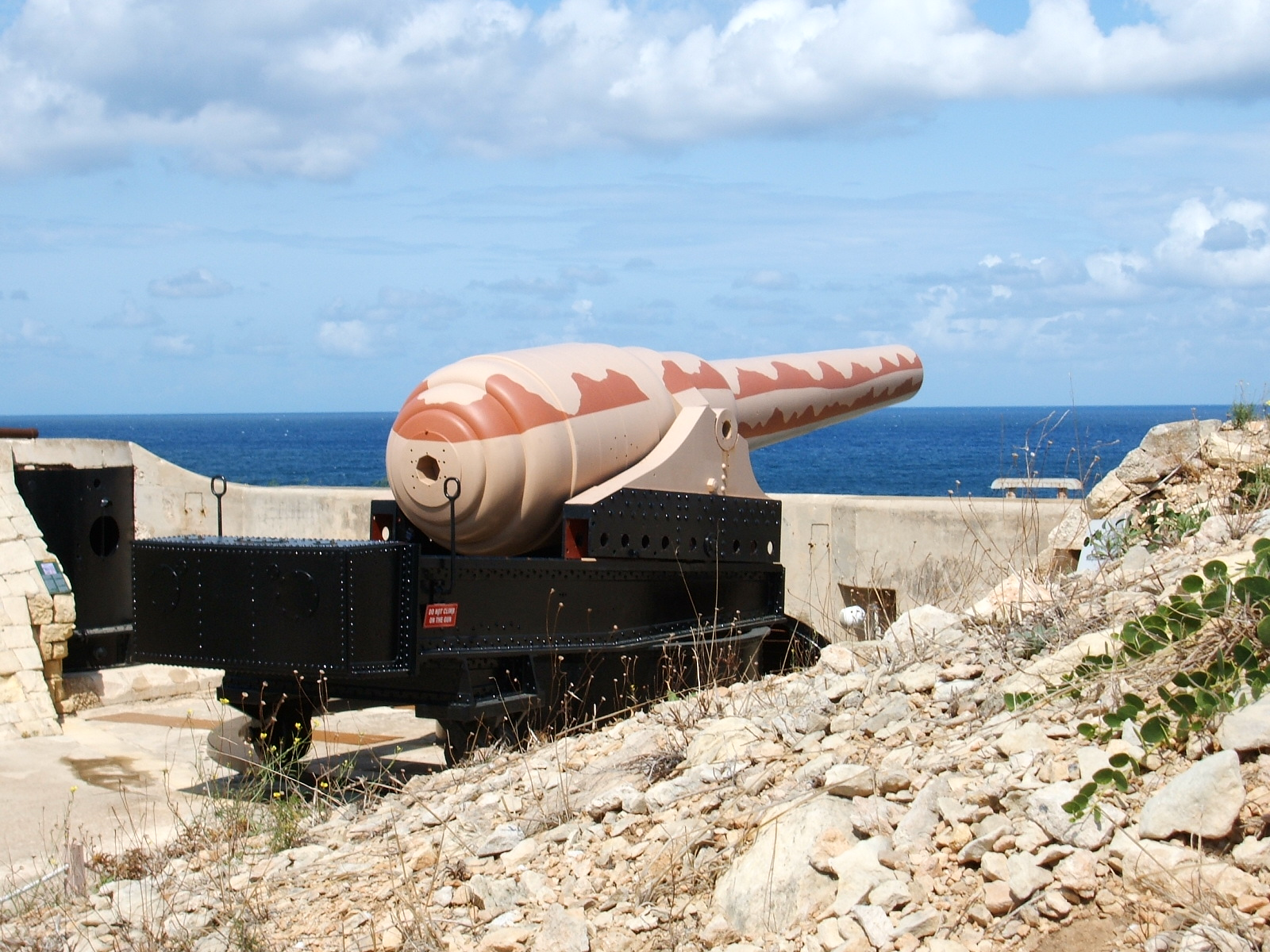
100-ton gun at Rinella Battery, installed by the British in the 1880s to counter a potential Italian naval threat to Malta

As the Language Question arose in Malta, mainland Italy was undergoing a process of unification which led to the establishment of the Kingdom of Italy in 1861. As Italian nationalism grew, a movement known as irredentism was established, and it argued for the incorporation of various territories including Malta into Italy. This movement did not have significant support on the islands, and the majority of Maltese people who opposed Anglicization in the mid-19th century did so for cultural rather than political reasons. Despite this, colonial authorities feared that Italian influences would lead to irredentist sentiments among Malta's educated classes.

In the 1860s, France was expanding its influence in North Africa and it opened the Suez Canal in 1869, further alarming the British who felt that their influence in the Mediterranean was being challenged. The British feared that the French could influence the Maltese lower classes due to the relatively large number of Maltese emigrants in French North Africa. The British authorities felt that intensifying their efforts at anglicization was necessary in order to ensure that the Maltese remained loyal to them rather than to other European powers, which contributed to the escalation of the Language Question by the late 1870s and 1880s.

== Politicization and escalation of the debate (1880–1940) ==
In 1878, the Rowsell-Julyan-Keenan Commission was sent to Malta and it published a report two years later. Patrick Keenan recommended using Maltese as a language of instruction to allow children to learn English, with subsequent education being solely in English. Penrose Julyan was in favour of introducing English within the administration and courts and phasing out Italian, although he stated that the latter should not be "forcibly restrained" and that Maltese should not be suppressed. He also associated Maltese Italophiles with sedition, increasing the political connotations of the linguistic debate. The reports by Julyan and Keenan (along with that by Francis Roswell who had proposed administrative and tax reforms) were regarded as hostile attempts to anglicise Malta at the expense of existing socio-cultural values.

Anglicization at the expense of Italian intensified in the 1880s, and the primary aim was to better integrate the Maltese people into the British Empire. Permanent Colonial Under-Secretary Robert Herbert stated in 1883 that this would help prevent Italian irredentism. At this point a number of Maltese Anglophiles began to play a leading role in promoting English over Italian, and they organized themselves into the Reform Party under the leadership of Sigismondo Savona. The party was in favour of the reforms recommended by the Rowsell-Julyan-Keenan Commission, and it saw anglicization as necessary for Maltese workers dependent on the British presence on the islands.

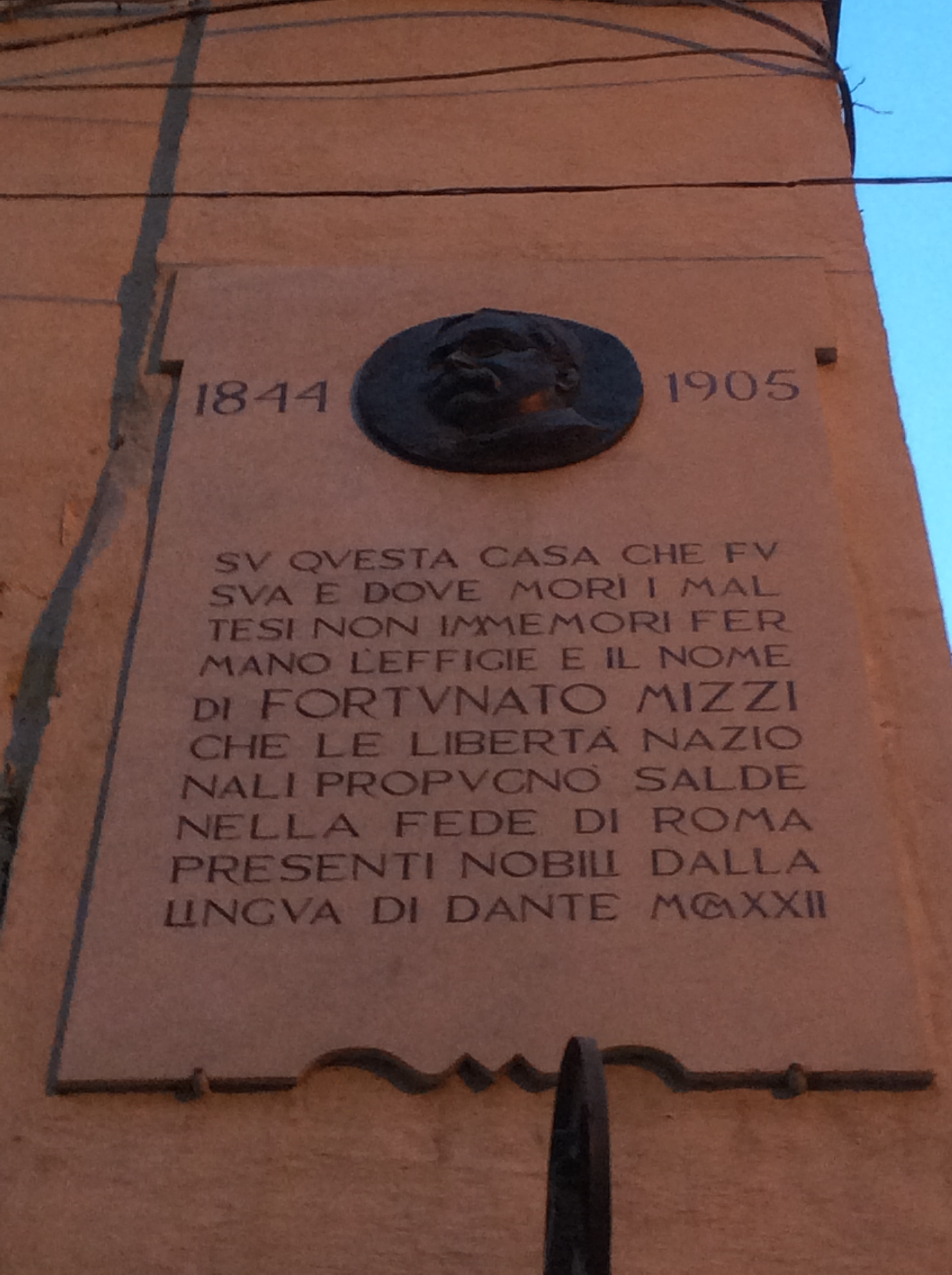
Italian-language plaque on Fortunato Mizzi's house in Valletta. It was installed in the 1950s, replacing the original plaque which had been installed in 1922 and vandalized in 1940.

Meanwhile Fortunato Mizzi set up the Anti-Reform Party (Italian: Partito Anti-Reformista) in opposition to the proposed reforms, and it later became known as the National Party (Italian: Partito Nazionale). The party regarded Italian as a necessary lingua franca for Malta and it actively promoted the language, although Mizzi also believed that English was important due to the islands' status as a British colony. The party wanted greater autonomy and was opposed to continued British rule. The colonial authorities made attempts to undermine the Anti-Reform Party by increasing the number of registered voters to ensure that pro-British members could be elected to the Council of Government.

The 1880s were characterized by frequent elections and resignations within the Council of Government, along with several reforms including a relatively liberal new constitution in 1887. Savona and Mizzi collaborated in opposition of Governor Lintorn Simmons and they briefly merged their parties into the Partito Unionista before splitting up again in 1893. The Church also played a role in politics, with the pro-British Pietro Pace being appointed as Bishop of Malta in the hopes of improving relations between the Maltese and their colonial masters. In 1895 Savona founded a new party known as the Partito Popolare, and he clashed with the Anglophile Gerald Strickland, the Chief Secretary to the Government. At this point Savona's party began to publish a newspaper in Italian, but later they began to promote the Maltese language. After an incident involving a British officer refusing to sign a transcript of evidence which was written in Italian in 1898, use of English was imposed in court in cases where non-Maltese British subjects were involved. This move was opposed by Mizzi, who travelled to London to petition more autonomy for Malta. Due to the disagreements brought about by the Language Question, the 1887 constitution was replaced by an autocratic one in 1903.

Gerald Strickland became a prominent figure in early 20th century Maltese politics, maintaining a pro-British stance and promoting both the English and Maltese languages. Fortunato Mizzi died in 1905 and his son Enrico Mizzi later became a prominent leader of the pro-Italian faction. In 1912, the younger Mizzi proposed that Britain should cede Malta to Italy in order to strengthen relations between the two powers. In the meantime, knowledge of English among the Maltese population began to increase, and it surpassed knowledge of Italian for the first time in the decade between 1901 and 1911. Contacts between British employers and Maltese workers played a role in this increase, and learning the language was also an incentive for Maltese emigrants seeking to go to English-speaking countries like Britain, Australia or the United States. At this point, more people could speak English rather than read or write the language. Knowledge of English remained lower than that of Italian among secondary students until the late 1930s.

In 1921, Malta was granted a new constitution which allowed for limited self-government, and English and Italian were recognized as the colony's two official languages. At this point, four political parties dominated the islands' political scene: the hard-line pro-Italian Democratic Nationalist Party (Italian: Partito Democratico Nazionalista, PDN) led by Enrico Mizzi, the moderate pro-Italian Maltese Political Union (Italian: Unione Politica Maltese, UPM) led by Ignazio Panzavecchia, the hard-line pro-British Constitutional Party (CP) led by Gerald Strickland and the moderate pro-British Labour Party (LP) led by William Savona, the son of Sigismondo Savona. The pro-Italian parties won the 1921 and 1924 elections, and they merged into the Nationalist Party (PN) in 1926. The CP won the 1927 election and Stickland became Prime Minister, before self-government was suspended in 1930 due to clashes between Strickland's government and the Catholic Church.

Chief Justice Sir Arturo Mercieca prepared a report about using Maltese in court in 1924, and he stated that the language was inadequate in this context and that it "would undoubtedly detract from the solemnity, the seriousness and decorum which characterized the Criminal Court." In 1931, 13.4% of the Maltese population knew Italian while 22.6% had knowledge of English. A local dialect, Maltese English, started forming. The rise of political parties changed Malta's socio-political landscape and led to public opinion starting to matter more. This resulted in the Maltese language acquiring increased importance since it was the language of the majority of the population. Maltese-language political newspapers such as Leħen is-Sewwa and Il-Berqa were first published in the 1920s and 1930s.

=== Rise of fascism in Italy and World War II ===
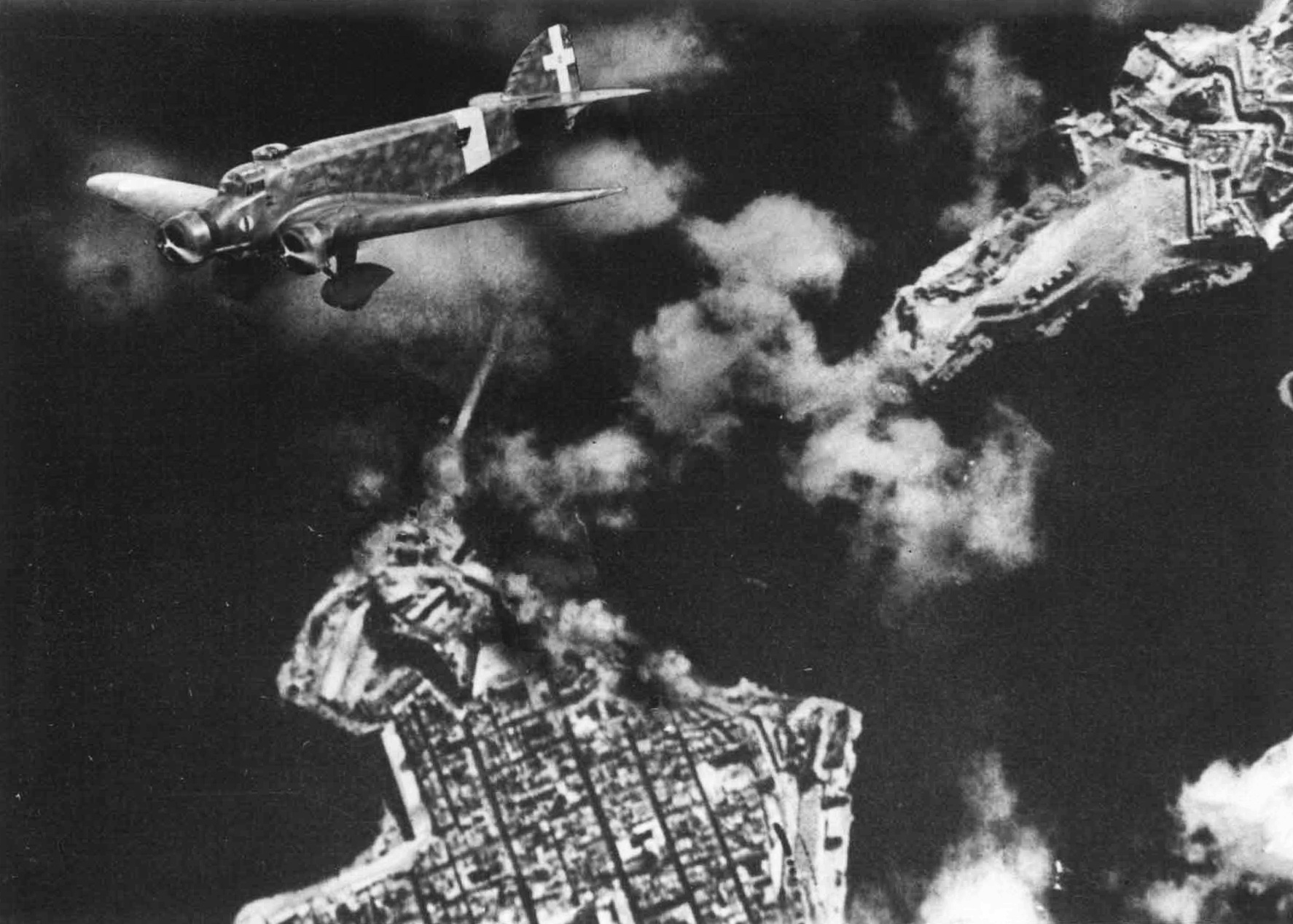
Italian aircraft bombing Valletta and the Grand Harbour in Malta in 1941

The fascist regime in Italy which was established in 1922 renewed irredentist claims over Malta, and this alarmed the British authorities and led to increased tensions in the Language Question. Italy made efforts to promote its culture in Malta, and the British authorities challenged this by further limiting the use of Italian. In 1927, bilingual public notices and street names were replaced by English-only versions. Self-government was restored in 1931 and the Nationalists won the elections held in 1932. They attempted to promote Italian language and culture including fascist propaganda in Malta, and this antagonized the British, leading to the 1921 self-government constitution being revoked in 1933. Usage of Italian in official contexts was phased out at this point although it remained a de jure official language.

On 21 August 1934, Maltese was declared to be an official language alongside English and Italian. In practice only English was used in administration and public notices, and Italian ceased to be an official language after increased tensions between Britain and Italy due to the Abyssinia Crisis and Italy's alliance with Nazi Germany in 1936. In the mid-1930s, Maltese civil servants with pro-Italian sympathies began to be dismissed from their jobs. A new constitution was established in 1939, and this recognized English and Maltese as the islands' official languages.

As the threat of war became more apparent, an anti-Italian sentiment appeared in the Maltese working classes. Fears of an Italian attack increased when World War II broke out in 1939, and prominent Nationalists including Enrico Mizzi were arrested as a precautionary measure. When Italy declared war in June 1940, pro-Italian civil servants including Arturo Mercieca were also arrested. They were later sent to internment camps in Uganda, where they remained throughout the war.

Malta was heavily bombarded by Italian and German aircraft between 1940 and 1943, and during the war the Maltese developed strong sympathies with the British.

== Resolution and legacy (after 1940) ==
Malta was granted self-government once again in 1947, and at this point universal suffrage was introduced which marked the end of the middle-class' hold on political power. By this point, it was clear that the Language Question had been resolved with Italian giving way to English and Maltese. By the 1940s Maltese literature and grammar were well-developed and the language was used in administrative settings. The majority of Malta's population never adopted Italian as their primary language, and although knowledge of English had increased significantly it was not enough to replace Maltese. Within the educated classes there was a minority which disregarded the new role of Maltese, such as professor J. E. Debono who stated in 1945 that the language can be dropped as its introduction had been a political goal to eliminate Italian and this been accomplished.

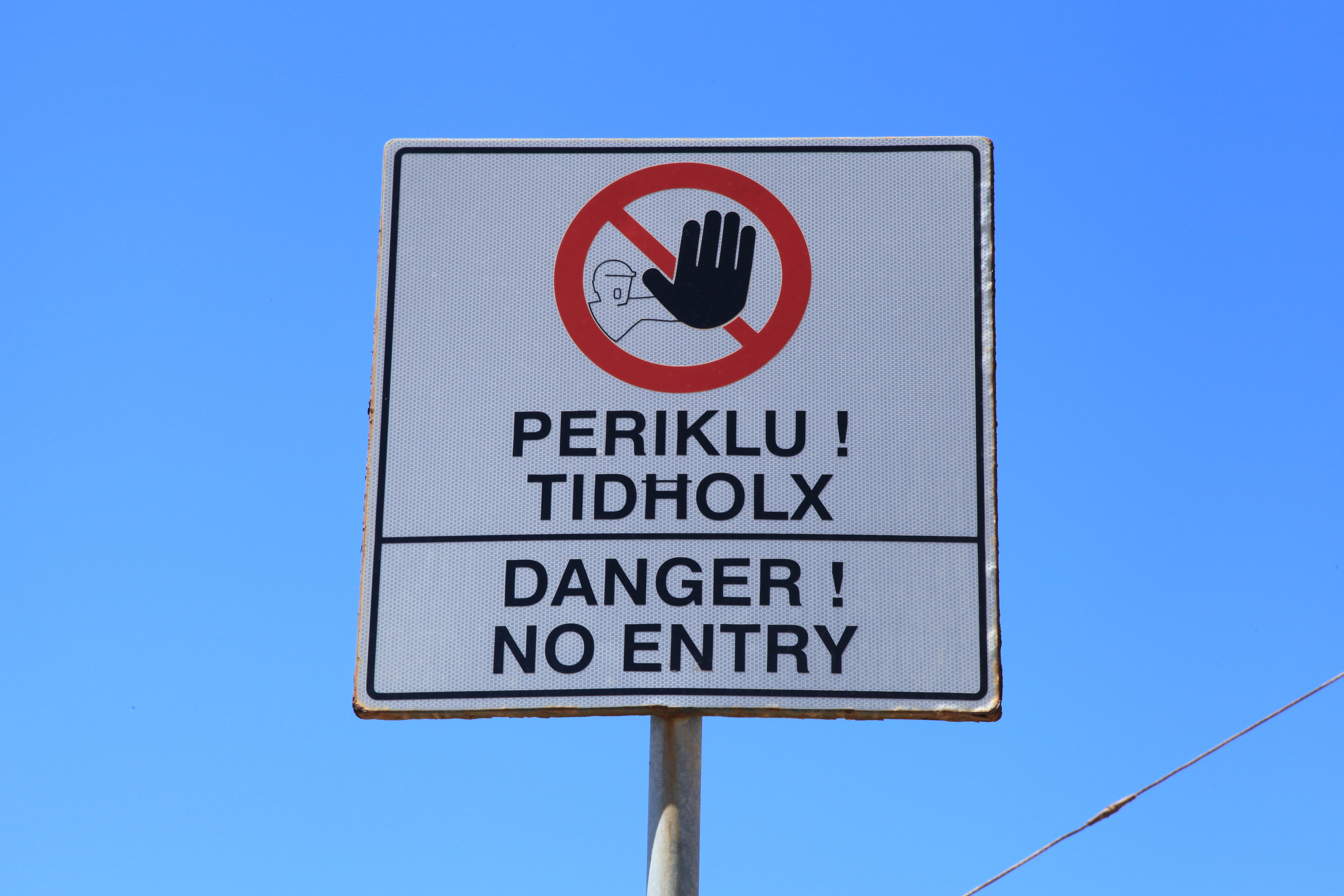
Bilingual danger sign at Comino in both Maltese and English

The position of Maltese was consolidated after education became compulsory in 1946 and many new schools were established around the islands. Both Maltese and English remained official languages when Malta achieved independence in 1964. Despite its resolution, the Language Question remained a sensitive topic for some time and it was not studied academically until the 1970s.

The Labour and Nationalist Parties, both of which were founded amidst the language debate, continue to dominate Maltese politics to the present day. In the 2011 census, out of a population of 377,952 people aged 10 and over, 357,692 (94.6%) stated that they speak at least average Maltese, 310,279 (82.1%) stated that they speak at least average English and 156,264 (41.3%) stated that they speak at least average Italian. Today, Maltese is the predominant language used in politics and administration. Both English and Maltese are used in education at primary and secondary levels, but English is dominant in tertiary education. Maltese, English and Italian are all represented in the media, and Italian remains particularly popular through television. The vitality of Maltese in contemporary Malta is quickly and increasingly perceived as being threatened by the use of English.

== Bibliography ==
- Brincat, Joseph M. (2017). "The Language Question and Education: a Political Controversy on a Linguistic Topic". In Sultana, Ronald G. (ed.). Yesterday's Schools: Readings in Maltese Educational History (PDF) (2 ed.). Malta: Xirocco Publishing. pp. 161–182. ISBN 978-99957-1-178-8.
- Cassar, Carmel (2000). A Concise History of Malta. Msida: Mireva Publications. ISBN 978-18705-7-952-0.
