= Sigismondo Savona =

Maltese educator and politician

- Born: 12 March 1835; Valletta, Crown Colony of Malta
- Died: 24 July 1908 (aged 73)
- Occupation: Politician
- Years active: 1875–1898
- Political party: Reform Party (until 1891, 1893–1895); Partito Unionista (1891–1893); People's Party - 1895 (1895–1898)
- Children: William Savona
- Military career
- Allegiance: United Kingdom
- Branch: Royal Malta Fencible Regiment
- Service years: 1852–1865

Sigismondo Savona (12 March 1835 – 24 July 1908) was a Maltese educator and politician who played a prominent role in the Language Question which defined the politics of the Crown Colony of Malta in the late 19th century.

== Early life ==
Savona was born in Valletta on 12 March 1835. He studied at the Normal School of the Royal Military Asylum in Chelsea. On 21 July 1852, at the age of 17, he joined the Royal Malta Fencible Regiment and rose to the rank of Hospital Sergeant. He was also the regiment's Schoolmaster, and he remained in the military until 22 June 1865.

== Political career ==
Savona's political career began when he was elected to Malta's Council of Government in the 1875 election. He favoured the reforms proposed in the Rowsell-Julyan-Keenan Commission including the abolition of the tax on grain and the promotion of the English language in Malta. He was appointed Director of Education in 1880, and he held the post for seven years until he resigned after a committee was set up to inquire into the University of Malta.

Savona joined and subsequently led the Reform Party and he recommended publishing the party's newspaper Public Opinion. He was elected in the 1889 election, and in 1891 he formed a new political party known as the Partito Unionista together with Evaristo Castaldi. This was short-lived and Savona re-established the Reform Party in 1893, but in 1895 he formed yet another party, the Partito Popolare, together with Mgr. Ignazio Panzavecchia, A. Dalli and A. Pullicino.

Savona retired from politics in 1898.

== Personal life ==
Savona died on 24 July 1908. He is buried at the Santa Maria Addolorata Cemetery in Paola, the largest burial ground of Malta. Savona had a son named William, who also became a politician and who founded the Labour Party.
