= History of the Maltese language =

The history of the Maltese language follows its arrival as Siculo-Arabic, to its development and use in the following centuries. After arriving as Siculo-Arabic the region would transform after being taken over by Knights Hospitaller after which Maltese became influenced by a superstratum of both Italian and French. Later Maltese would decline in use and prestige during British administration, although it was given official language status during the language question. After independence language reforms would result it becoming the standard language taught to all Maltese people.

== Languages prior to Maltese ==
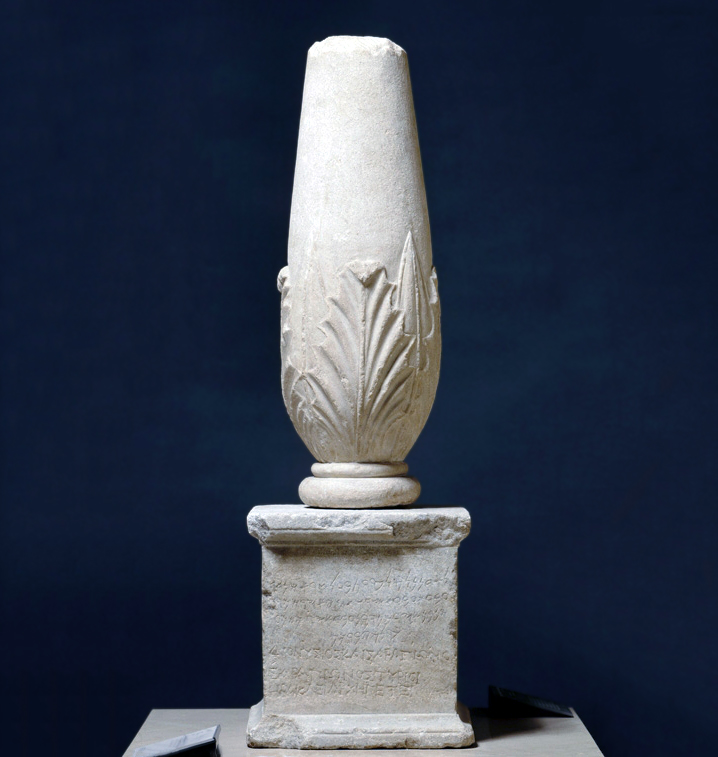
One of the Cippi of Melqart which were discovered in Malta

Prior to Maltese the main language on the island was the Punic language, after Carthaginian colonization of the island. Greek was also common on the island. Following an invasion by Rome, the island still retained the Punic language for centuries after. Latin emerged on the island spoken by Roman administration however common speech remained Punic. At the end of the western Roman Empire coins minted in Malta were still written in Punic. North Africa and Malta were one of the first parts of the Roman Empire to adopt Christianity, with Paul the Apostle preaching there, resulting in more Greek being spoken over time, particularly under Byzantine rule. Early categorization of Maltese in the 1700s grouped the language with Punic; however, in modern linguistics this classification is widely rejected.

Malta was used extensively as a penal colony during Byzantine rule, with the population consisting primarily of exiles there for various offenses. Arab influence emerged towards the end of Byzantine rule, with trade occurring between the Byzantines and Umayyads resulting in various North African artifacts being found on the island. As the decline of the Byzantine Empire grew, North Africa was conquered by the Umayyads, despite this the Island remained in Byzantine hands slightly after. After the island was cut off from trade partners in North Africa instability on the island grew and the economy of Malta collapsed resulting in most of the population migrating. Malta was then primarily used as a military base for a Byzantine garrison. After the Muslim conquest of Malta, the island was almost completely abandoned. Despite this archaeological evidence indicates the island was still populated, although not as organized during the Roman or even Byzantine periods and existing on subsistence farming.

== Arrival of Siculo-Arabic speakers ==
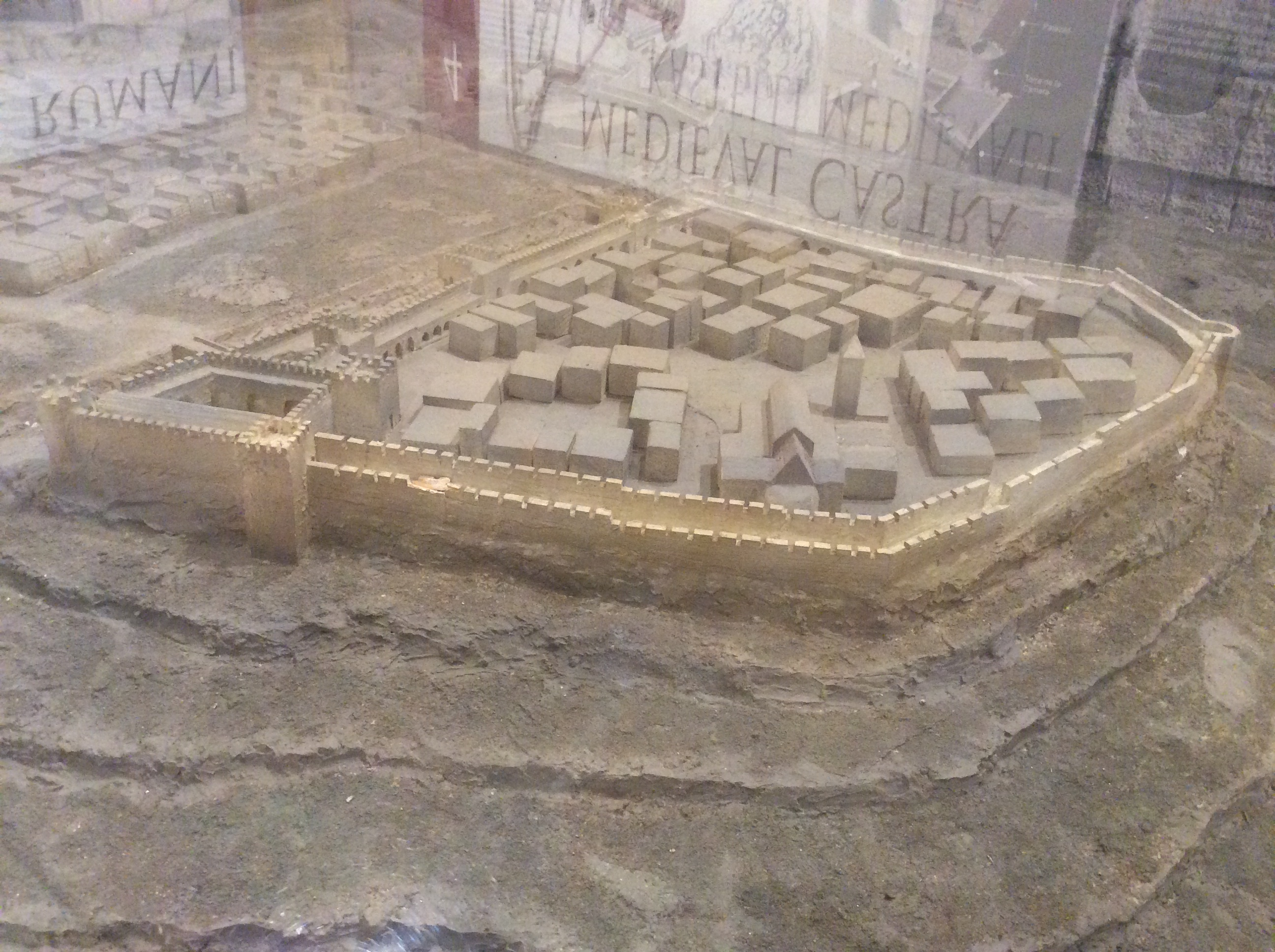
Reconstruction of medieval Mdina

After the end of Byzantine rule on the island most of the island was abandoned, although habitation continued at a limited scale. The Punic language previously the main language spoken on the island declined in north Africa, with most speakers adopting Arabic, which contained similar linguistic structure. The island was resettled by the Aghlabids by the 11th century, after which the Fatimids gained control of the island. The Fatmids are responsible for the introduction of Siculo-Arabic to the island from neighbouring Sicily.

== Norman invasion ==
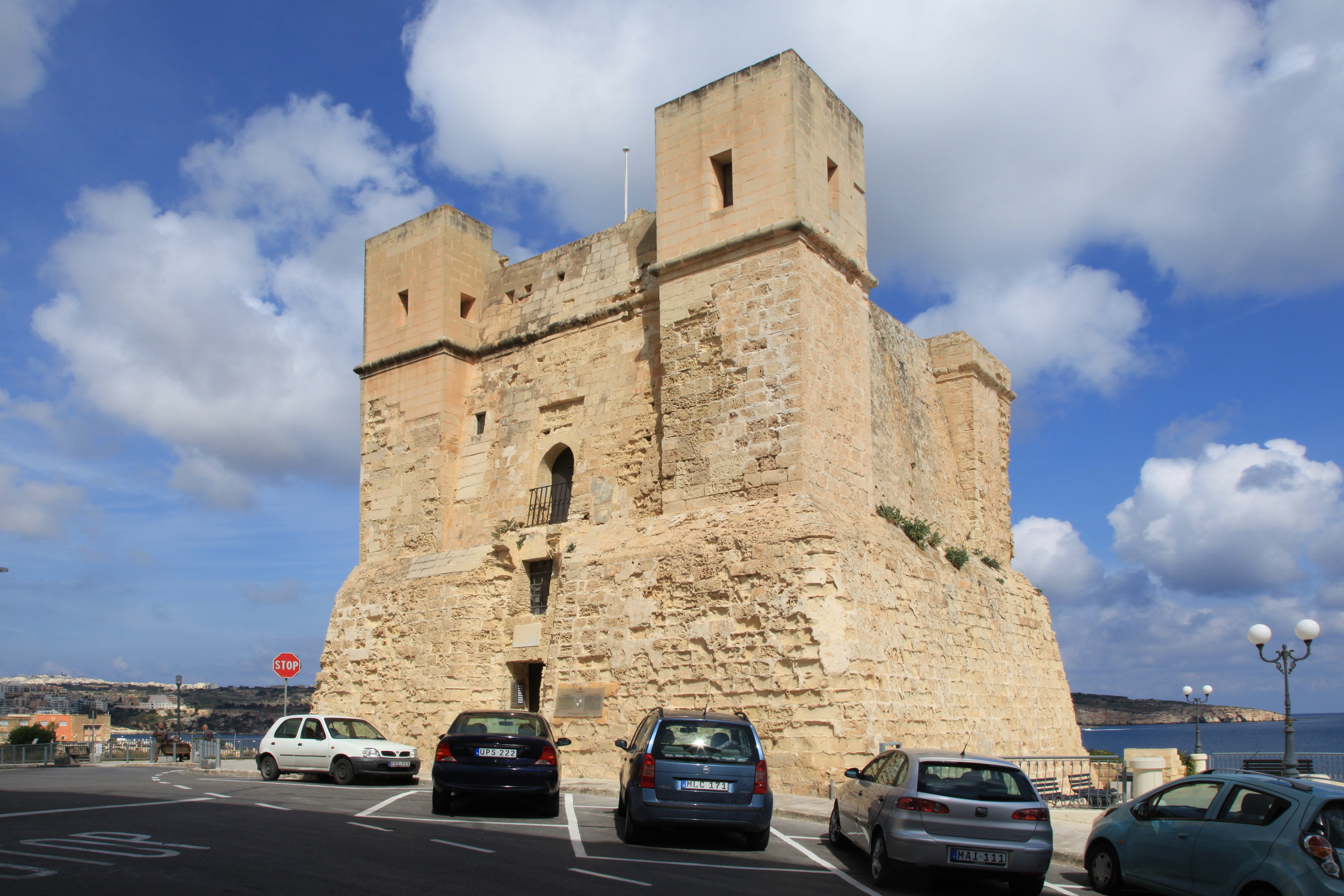
Wignacourt Tower, the oldest surviving watchtower in Malta

In June 1091 the County of Sicily invaded Malta successfully resulting in a period of Christian rule. The Norman administration was generally light allowing Muslims on the island to continue practicing as well speaking of the Arabic language, with religious conversions appearing to have occurred gradually. This allowed for the Maltese population to be gradually converted with no mass exodus by the Maltese.

== Hospitaller Malta ==
=== Italian, Greek and French superstratum ===
Maltese has a superstratum of influences from other languages, that differentiates it from North African variants of Arabic. The largest influences are Romance influences, primarily from Sicilian Italian and Norman French. Greek also had an influence on the Maltese language. This occurred due to language contact with the Romance languages.

=== Development of script ===
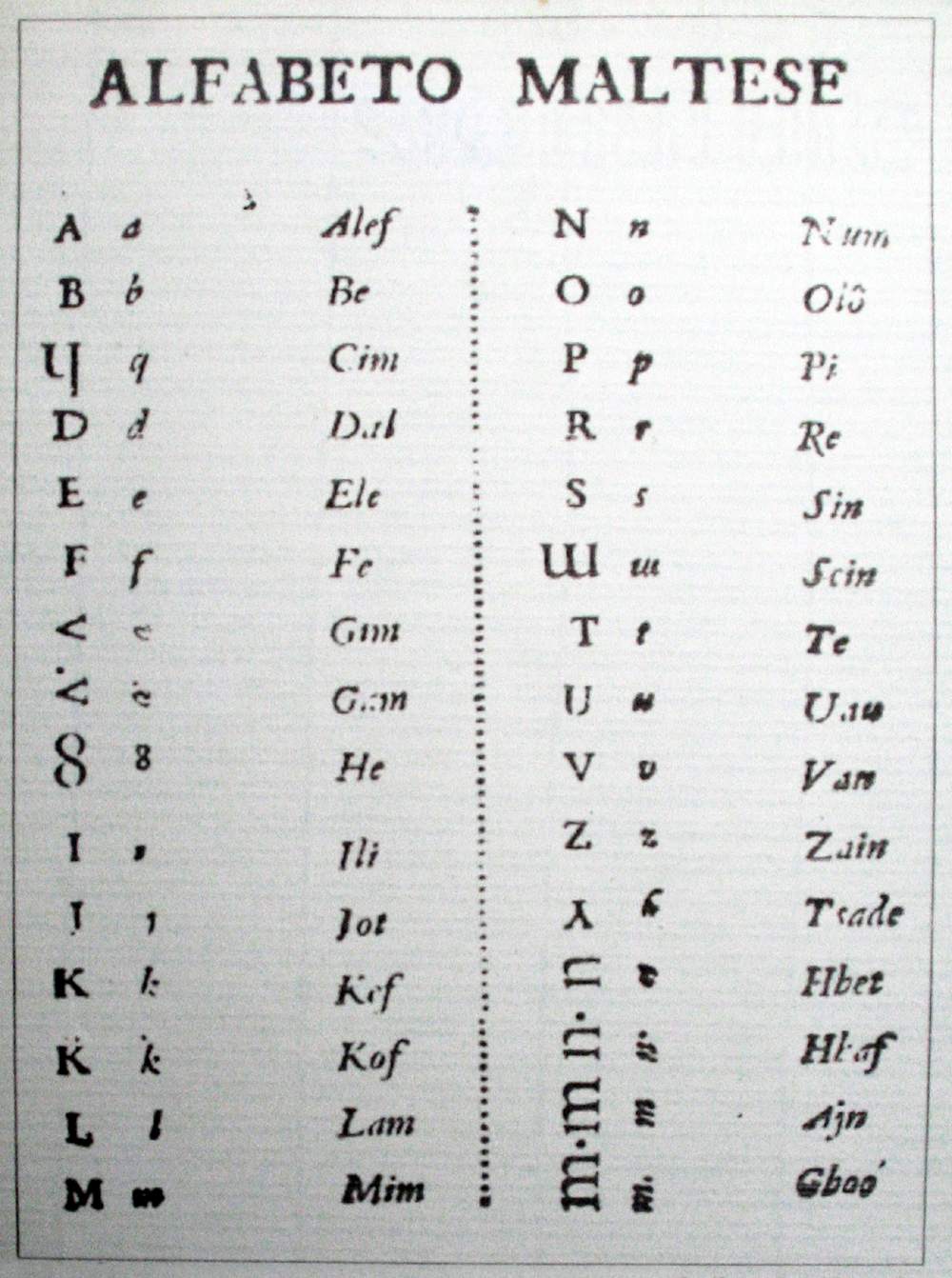
Old Maltese Vassalli's alphabet (1788)

Maltese is the only Arabic derived language that is written in the Latin Script. The Script uses various unique symbols for different types of glottal stops. Mikiel Anton Vassalli a Maltese scholar proposed that Maltese writing should be taught in both in Latin and an Arabic script. At the time Maltese was an almost exclusively an oral language, although limited writing and literature did exist in Maltese. The proposals did not gain traction and Maltese literacy would not become common until the 20th century.

== British Malta ==
Malta under Britain developed to be trilingual, with the British administration speaking English, the Maltese elite speaking Italian, and the common population speaking Maltese.

=== Decline of Maltese ===
After the takeover of Malta from the French during the Napoleonic wars, the local language remained Maltese with standard use of Italian as the administrative language. In the following decades following more integration into the British Empire, boarding schools were set up which exclusively taught English, with parents encouraged to send their children to Britain for education. In the following decades use of Maltese declined compared to English and Maltese Italian. As Maltese was most commonly spoken by the working classes, interest by the language by officials was muted. By comparison, Italian having been used for centuries as the administrative language of the island saw its use advocated by sections of the Maltese upper class. Despite this organization in British Malta emerged to archive Maltese literature, document its variation and grammar, and advocate for its continued use. This came to a head during the Language Question.

=== Minor revival effort ===
In Malta many children were sent to boarding schools in the United Kingdom, where they learned English as a primary language. Likewise the British administration favoured speakers of English over Maltese or Italian.

== Independent Malta ==
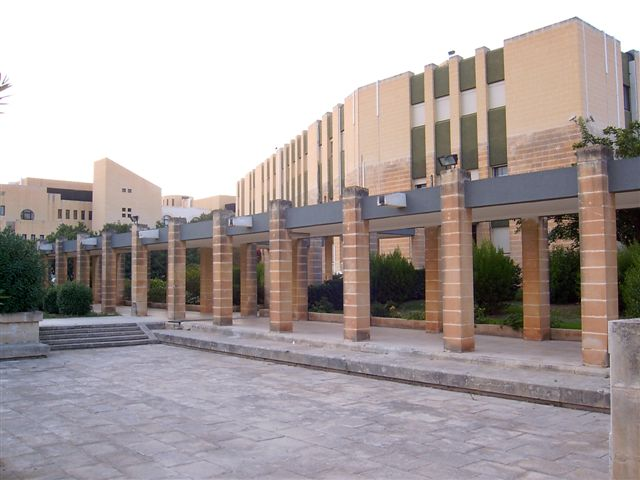
Campus of the University of Malta

While language had declined it still had always remained in regular use among sections of the Maltese population. Following the independence of Malta, language reforms under the Dom Mintoff government saw the language gain an increase in use, and today is used regularly in Malta.

=== Use and prevalence ===
Today Maltese is by far the most commonly understood language in Malta with 98% of the population understanding the language. Italian comes in second, and English third.

== See also ==
- Pantesco dialect
