= Italian irredentism in Malta =

Italian political and nationalist movement

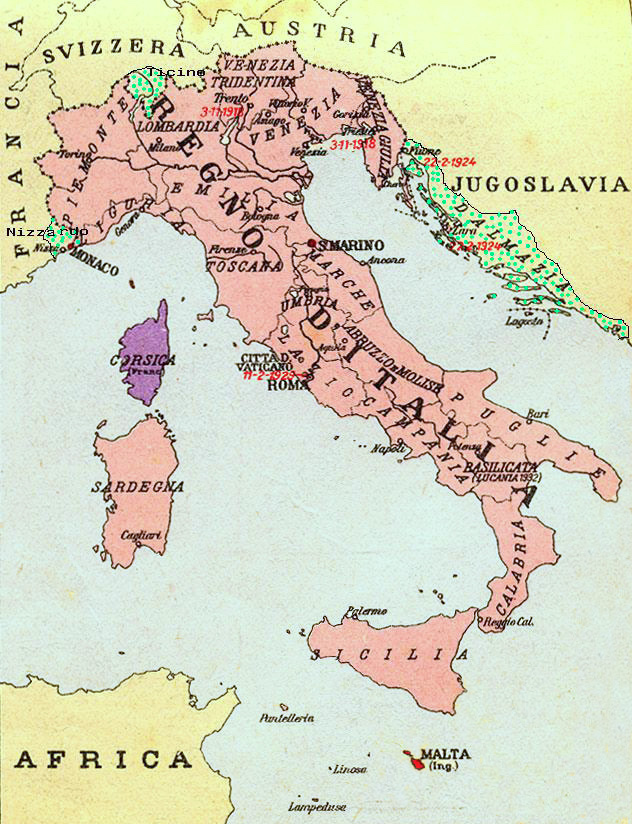
Italian ethnic regions claimed in the 1930s by the Italian irredentism: * Green: Nice, Ticino and Dalmatia * Red: Malta * Violet: Corsica * Savoy and Corfu were later claimed

Italian irredentism in Malta is the movement that uses an irredentist argument to propose the incorporation of the Maltese islands into Italy, with reference to past support in Malta for Italian territorial claims on the islands. Although Malta had formally ceased to be part of the Kingdom of Sicily only since 1814 following the Treaty of Paris, Italian irredentism in Malta was mainly significant during the Italian Fascist era.

== Italy and Malta before 1814 ==
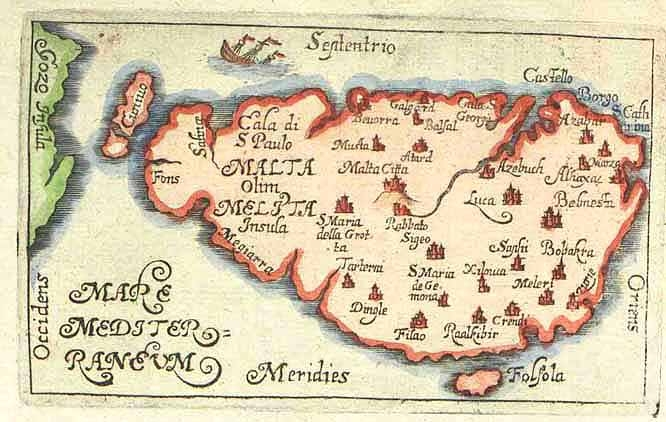
Map of Malta in the 16th century, when Italian was declared the official language by the Knights of Malta

Until the end of the 18th century Malta's fortunes—political, economic, religious, cultural—were closely tied with Sicily's. Successive waves of immigration from Sicily and Italy strengthened these ties and increased the demographic similarity. Italian was Malta's language of administration, law, contracts and public records, Malta's culture was similar to Italy's, Malta's nobility was originally composed of Italian families who had moved to Malta mainly in the 13th century and the Maltese Catholic Church was suffragan of the Archdiocese of Palermo.

There were minor and subtle differences, however. In the early 15th century Malta was incorporated directly into the Sicilian crown following an uprising which led to the abolishment of the County of Malta. Domestic governance was thus left to the Università and the Popular Council, early forms of representative local government. The Maltese language, the creation of the Diocese of Malta as well as the granting of Malta to the Knights Hospitaller in 1530 were developments which started to give a distinct character to Maltese culture and history.

Following a brief French occupation (1798–1800) the British established control over Malta while it was still formally part of the Kingdom of Sicily. During both the French and British periods, Malta officially remained part of the Sicilian Kingdom, although the French refused to recognise the island as such in contrast to the British. Malta became a British Crown Colony in 1813, which was confirmed a year later through the Treaty of Paris (1814).

== Italian culture in Malta between 1814 and the Fascist era ==
Cultural changes were few even after 1814. In 1842, all literate Maltese learned Italian while only 4.5% could read, write and/or speak English. However, there was a huge increase in the number of Maltese magazines and newspapers in Italian language during the 1800s and early 1900s.

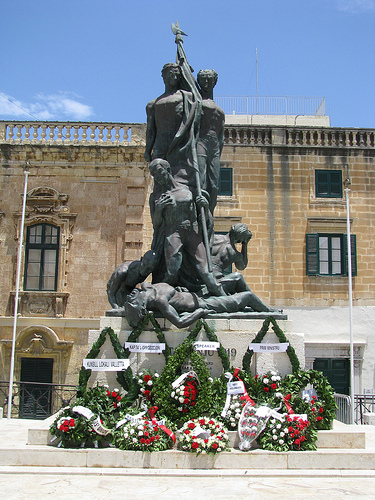
The Sette Giugno monument, symbol of the pro-Italian Maltese.

In 1878, a Royal Commission (the Rowsell-Julyan-Keenan Commission) recommended in its report the Anglicisation of the educational and judicial systems. While the judicial system remained predominantly Italian until the 20th century, teaching of the English language started to be enforced in State schools at the expense of Italian.

The Royal Commission's report also had significant political impact. Supporters and opponents organised themselves into a Reform and Anti-Reform parties which, apart from being the forerunners of the present day two main political parties in Malta, assumed respectively the anglophile and italophile imprint (and also, subsequently, pro-colonial and anti-colonial policies) that were to characterise them for decades to come.

Sette Giugno, a popular revolt in Malta in 1919, was later considered in fascist Italy as the beginning of the "active" Italian irredentism in Malta. This commemoration (official since 1986) is in remembrance of the riots of 1919 when the Maltese population organized marches to obtain some form of representative government. Four people died when troops stationed on the islands fired into the crowd.

== Fascist era and World War II ==
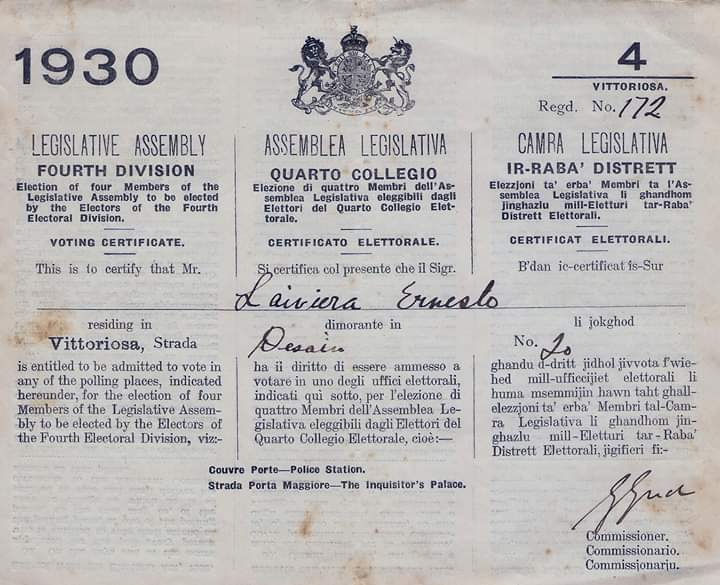
Tri-lingual voting document for the later cancelled 1930 elections in Malta

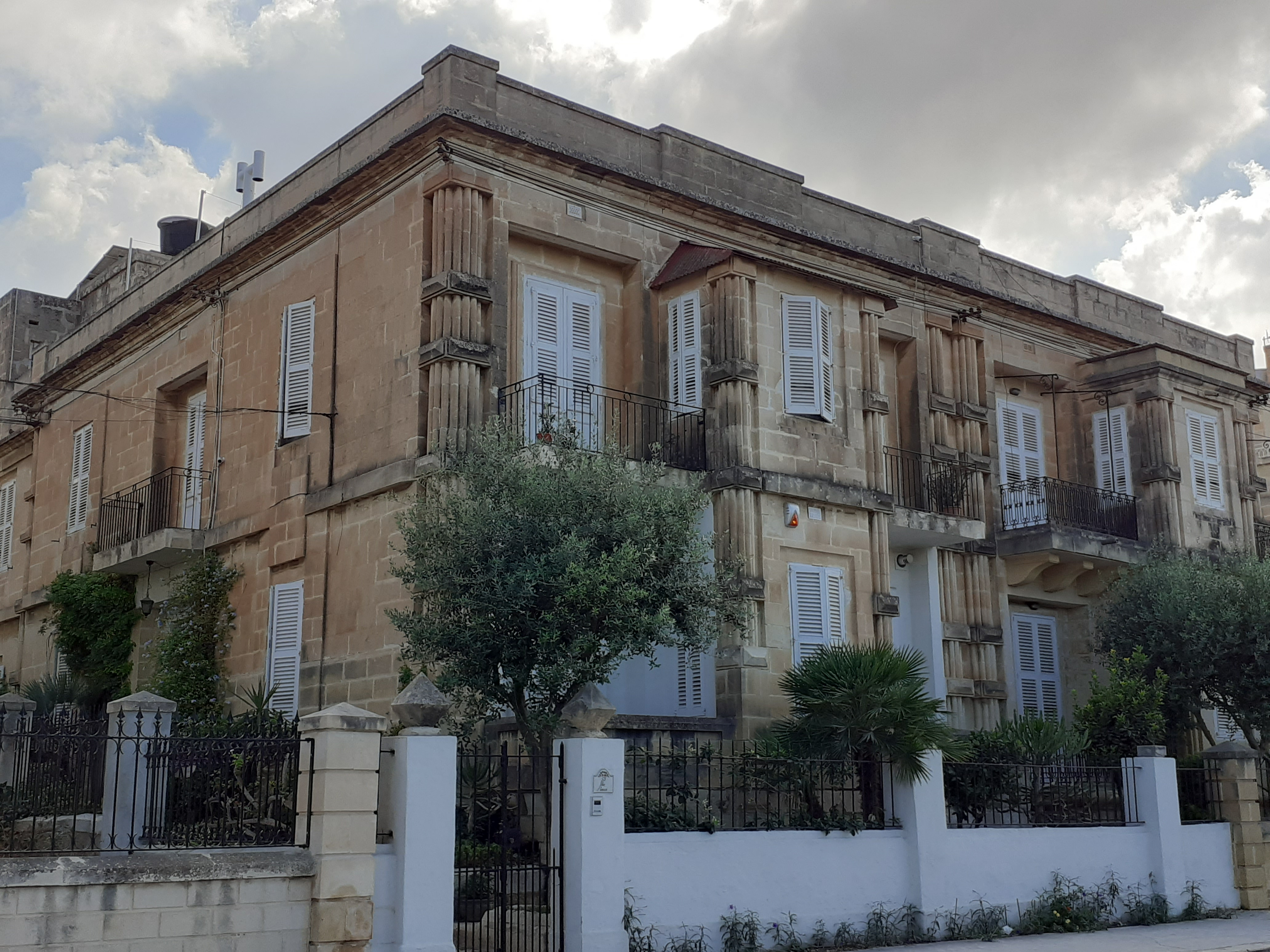
Villa Gloria by Alberto La Ferla in Ta' Xbiex, in Stile Littorio with prominent fasci-like columns

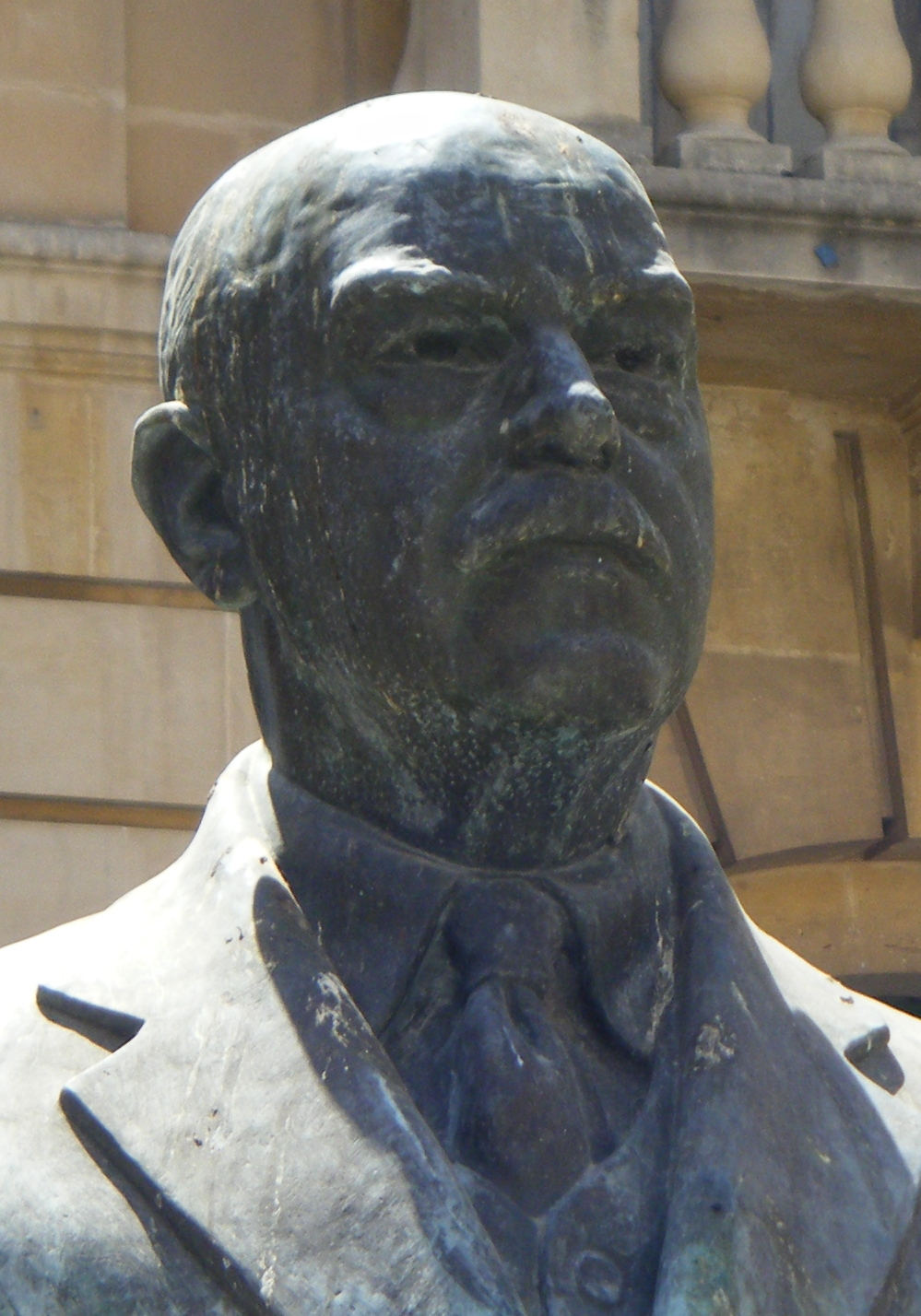
Enrico Mizzi (Malta's Prime Minister in 1950) was jailed in 1940 for his "pro-Italian irredentism" opinions.

The Fascists invested heavily in promoting Italian culture in Malta. They made overtures to a minority who not only loved Italy's language but also saw Malta as a geographical extension of the Italian mainland. Malta was described as "the extreme end of Italian soil" (Senator Caruana Gatto who represented the nobility in Malta in 1923).

The battle, however, was still being fought in largely cultural terms, as the "Language Question" on the role of Italian in education. This led to the revoking (the second) of the Maltese Constitution in 1934 over the Government's budgetary vote for the teaching of Italian in elementary schools. Italian was eventually dropped from official language status in Malta in 1934, its place being taken by Maltese. Italian ceased to be taught at all levels of education and the language of instruction at the University of Malta and the Law Courts. In 1935 there were manifestations against all these decisions, promoted by the Maltese fascists; the Nationalist Party declared that most of the Maltese population was supporting directly or indirectly the Italian Maltese's struggle. But when Italy entered the war on the side of the Axis powers and aerial bombardments of Malta began, what little interest in Italian irredentism that existed in Malta was lost.

The colonial authorities however took precautions; in 1940 they interned and eventually deported 49 Italophile Maltese to Uganda including the leader of the Nationalist Party, Enrico Mizzi. Another 700 Maltese with ideals linked to the Italian irredentism in Malta were sent to camps in central Africa.

A number of Maltese living in Italy participated in fascist organizations and joined the Italian military forces during World War II. Among them were Carmelo Borg Pisani, Antonio Cortis, Paolo Frendo, Ivo Leone Ganado, Roberto Mallia, Manuele Mizzi, Antonio Vassallo, Joe d’Ancona and Carlo Liberto.

Carmelo Borg Pisani attempted to enter Malta during the war (Operation Herkules), but was captured and executed as an alleged spy in November 1942. He received the Gold Medal of Military Valor, the highest Italian military award, by King Victor Emmanuel III a few days after his death. Requests have been made by his family and the Italian government to exhume his body and give it a burial outside prison grounds, which request has never been acceded to. Benito Mussolini called him a "Maltese Martyr" and created in his honor in Liguria the Battaglione Borg Pisani in November 1943, in which other Maltese irredentists fought.

== After World War II ==
Since World War II, there have been no calls for Italian irredentism in Malta. Enrico Mizzi became Malta's Prime Minister in 1950, but never denied his past when he promoted the union of Malta to Italy: he defined himself as "a man without stain and without fear" (in Italian: "Uomo senza macchia e senza paura").

== See also ==
- Italy–Malta relations
- Italian Maltese
- Carmelo Pisani
- Enrico Mizzi
