= Italy–Malta relations =

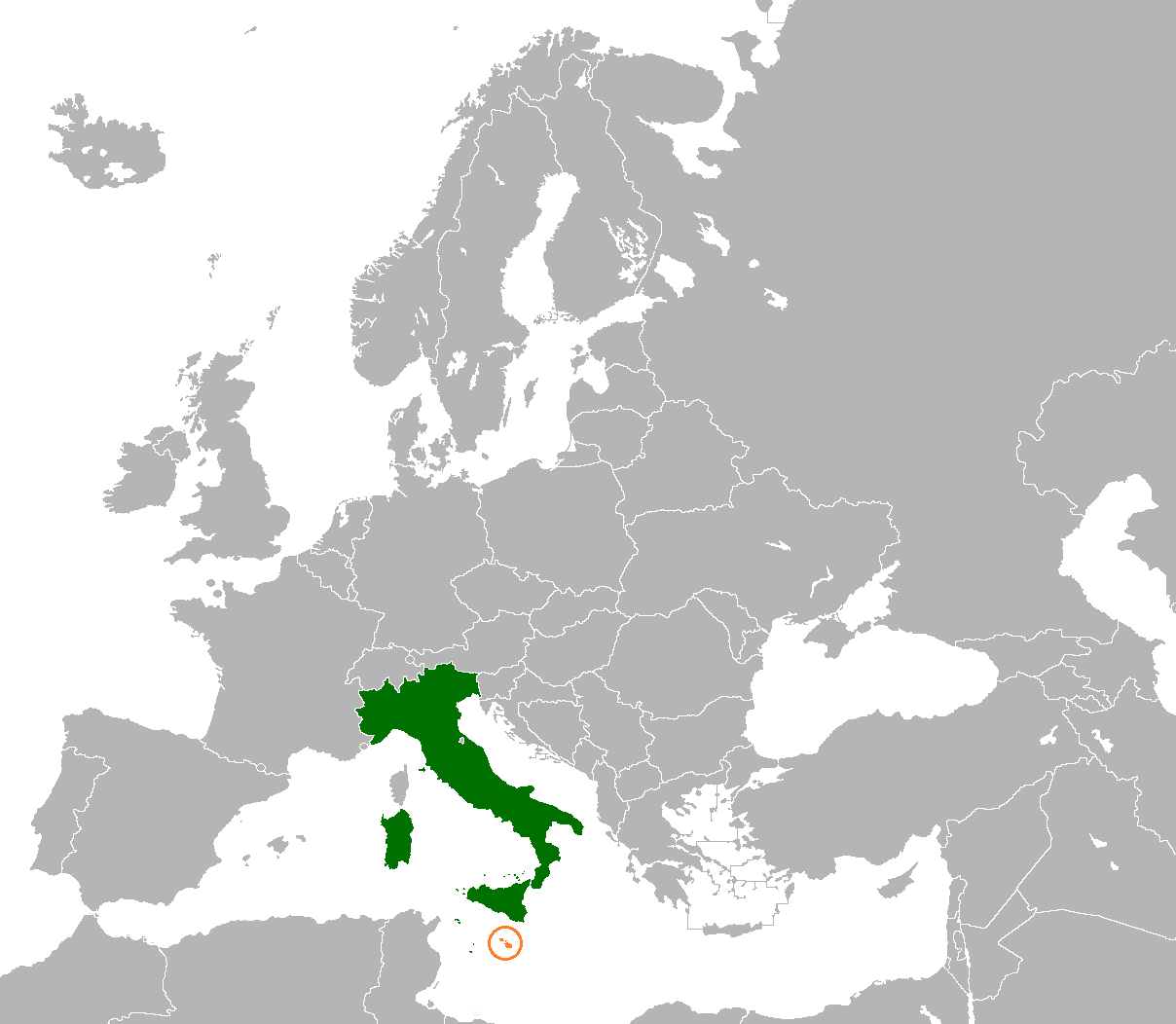
- Italy: Malta

Italy–Malta relations are bilateral relations between the Italian Republic and the Republic of Malta. Both countries established official diplomatic relations soon after Malta's independence. Both countries are members of the European Union, Organization for Security and Co-operation in Europe, Union for the Mediterranean and the United Nations.

== History ==
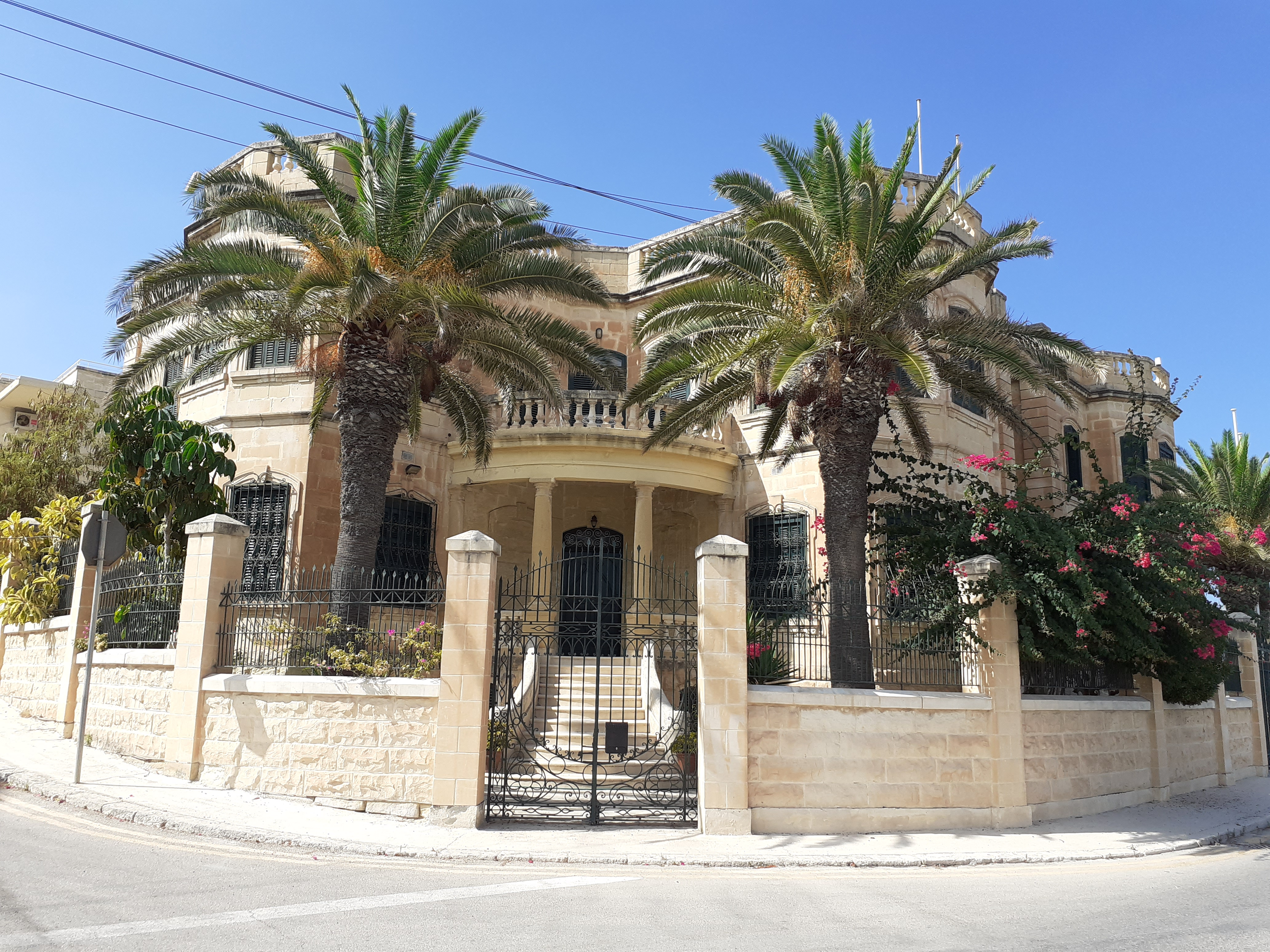
Villa Bel Air in Ta' Xbiex, residence of the Italian ambassador to Malta

=== Pre-independence relations ===
Malta and the Italian peninsula have a long history of relations given their proximity. Malta was part of the Normans' Kingdom of Sicily and remained associated with the Italian kingdom until 1194. The Kingdom of Naples would be involved in the war against the French occupation of the island. Italian was the official language in Malta since the Knights Hospitaller until the British control. In 1800 Malta became a protectorate jointly administered by Naples and the United Kingdom, although the latter had more influence. By 1813 the island became a British colony and thus moved outside the Italian sphere, although the presence of Italian culture and language remained strong. Starting in 1814, there were Italian irredentist movements in Malta. However, these movements were only supported by a small minority, and did not impact future Italian-Maltese relations. Indeed, Italian designs on the island were highlighted in April 1933, when on a visit to the island, Italian cabinet undersecretary Francesco Giunta stated that he was on Italian soil and that the future of the island lay in complete union with Italy. The two countries clashed during World War II when Italy bombed the island during the Siege of Malta. Malta's rejection of Mussolini's fascism and Nazi support led to Italy bombing Malta for two years between 1940 and 1942.

=== Independent relations ===
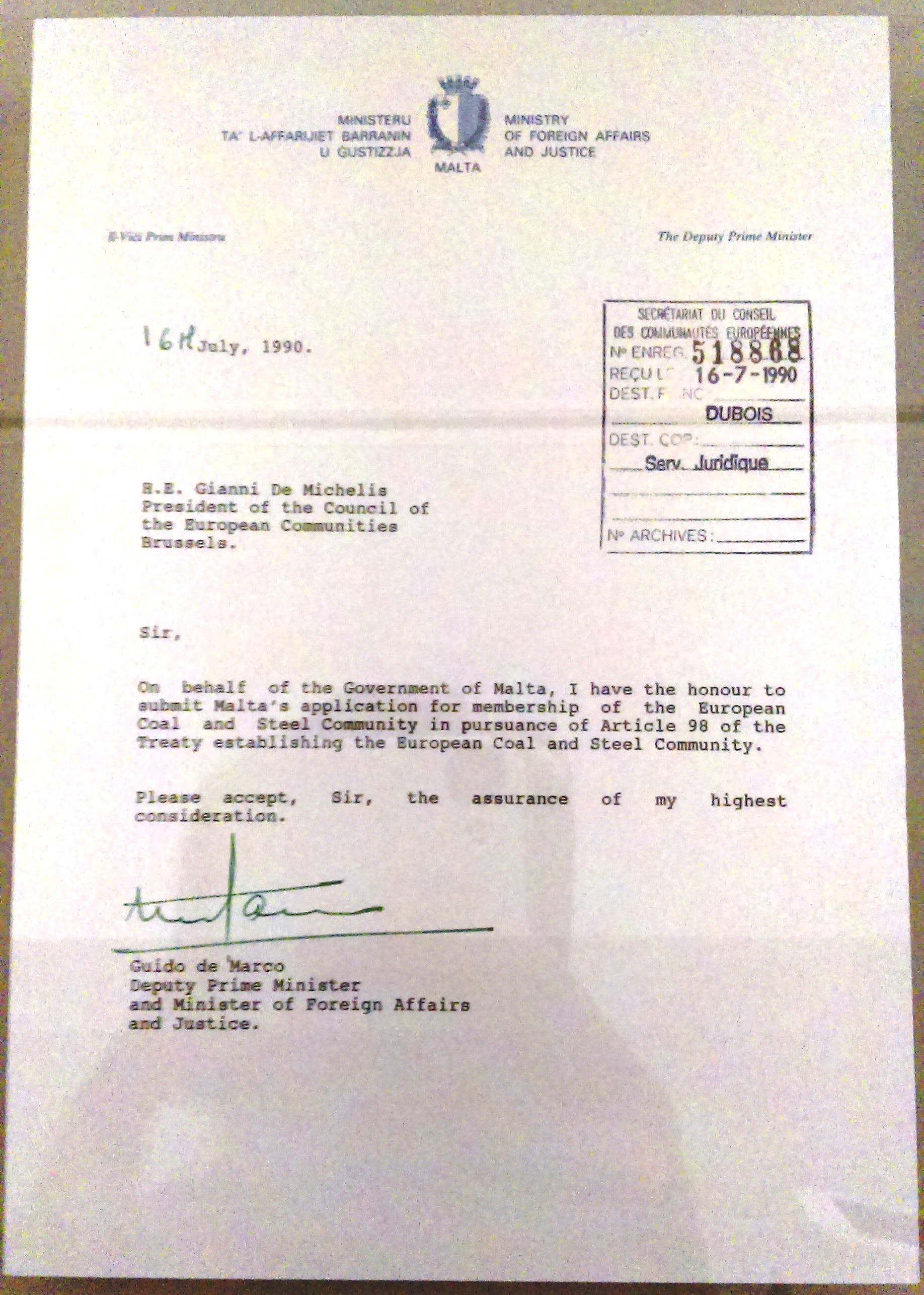
Letter of application for membership of the European Economic Community by Malta, 1990. Sent from the Maltese foreign affairs minister Guido de Marco to the Italian foreign affairs minister Gianni De Michelis, at the time holding the rotating presidency of the EU Council. Held at the House of European History in Brussels

Italy was the first country to establish a diplomatic mission in Malta and the first to appoint a resident ambassador (since then resident at Villa Bel Air in Ta' Xbiex) after Malta achieved independence and became a full member of the UN. On December 1, 1964, the first Italian ambassador presented his credentials to the governor general, Sir Maurice Dorman.

In 1980, Malta entered into a neutrality agreement with Italy, under which Malta agreed not to enter into any alliance and Italy agreed to guarantee Malta's neutrality. Malta's relations with Italy have been described as "generally excellent".

== Linguistic ties ==
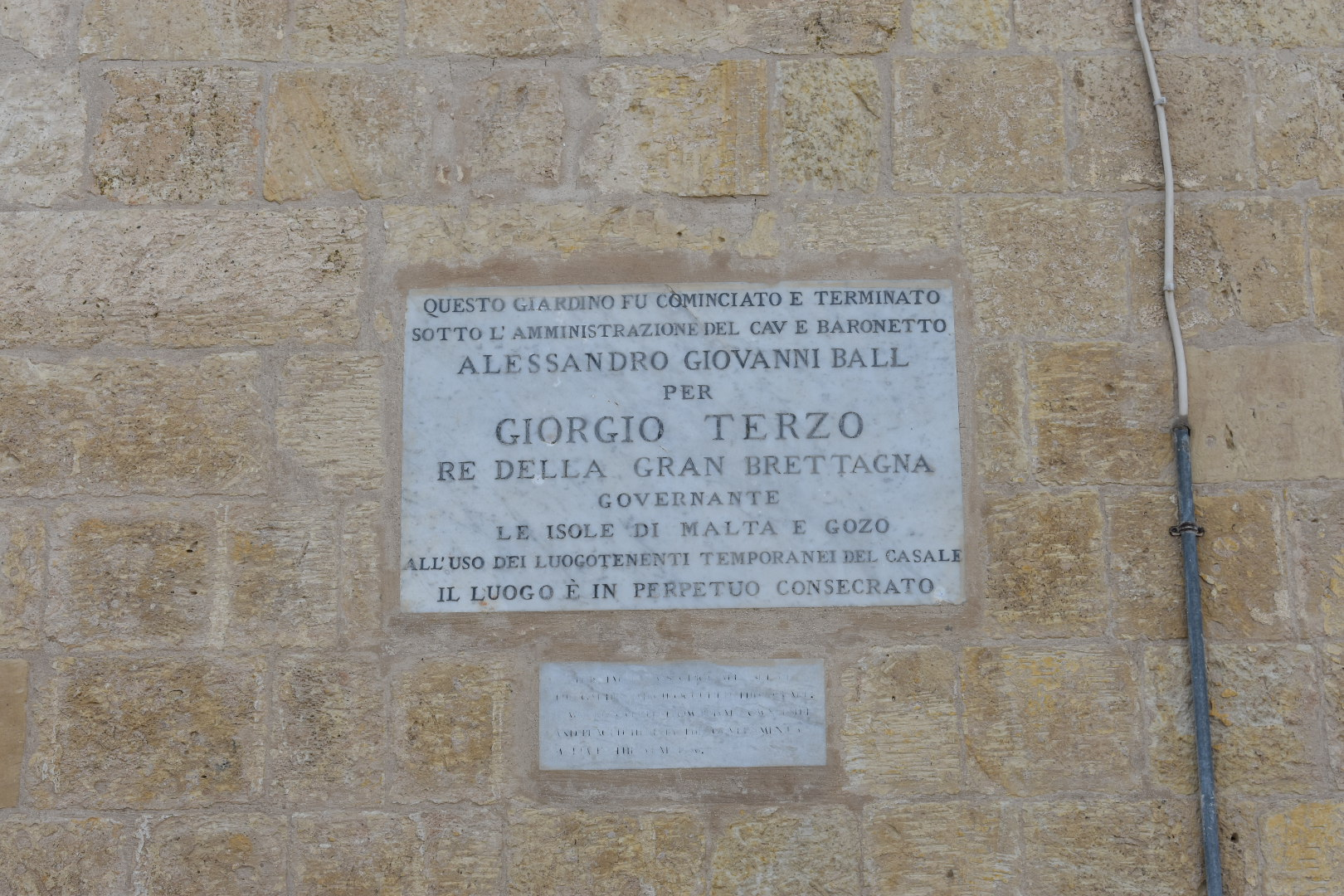
An early 19th century British colonial inscription from a garden in Żabbar written in Italian

For many centuries and until 1934, Italian was the official language of Malta. Indeed, it was considered the language of culture in Malta since the Italian Renaissance. In the 19th century, Italian irredentists and Italian Maltese wanted to promote its use throughout Malta for plans to re-unify it to Italy as Malta was part of the Kingdom of Sicily up to 13th century. In the first decades of the 20th century, there was even a struggle within Maltese society and politics over the "language problem", which came to a head before World War II. In 1933, the Constitution was withdrawn over the Government's budgetary vote for the teaching of Italian in elementary schools. The use of Italian in official matters was politically motivated by the anti-reformist party and by the Roman Catholic Church as a form of status quo and conservative measures against the Protestant British.

Today, 66% of the Maltese population can speak Italian, and 8% of the population "prefer" to use it in day-to-day conversation, due to the large recent influx of Italian immigrants. Although Italian has been replaced by English as the official language, it is still used and is spoken commonly in certain professional workplaces by Italian immigrants. The percentage of speakers today, 66%, is in fact much greater than when the language was actually official, in 1931, when only 14% spoke it. A large number of Maltese learn Italian through television, as Italian television channels from Italy-based broadcasters, such as Mediaset and RAI, reach Malta and remain popular.

== Diplomatic relations ==
Italy has an embassy in Valletta. Malta has an embassy in Rome and 18 honorary consulates (in Bari, Bologna, Brescia, Cagliari, Catania, Genoa, Livorno, Milan, Naples, Palermo, Perugia, Reggio Calabria, Savona, Syracuse, Turin, Trieste, and Venice).

== Historical notable persons in Italian-Maltese relations ==
- Mattia Preti, painter
- Alberto Pullicino, painter
- Pietro Paolo Floriani, architect, after whom Floriana was named

== Notable contemporary persons with double citizenship of Italy and Malta ==
- Arnold Cassola, politician
- Aidan Zammit, musician
- Samuel Deguara, basketball player

== See also ==
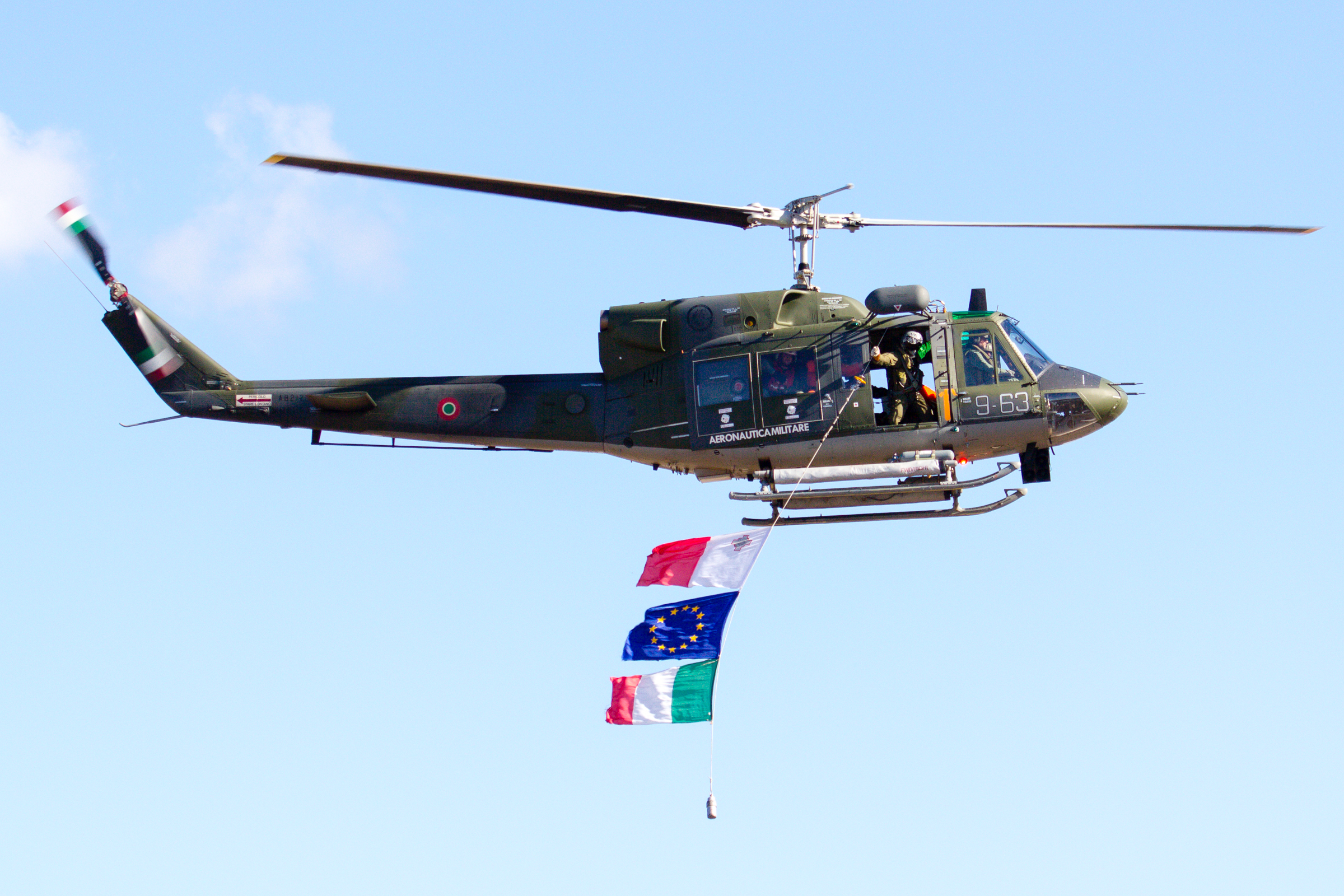
Italian Air Force AB 212 at the 2015 Malta International Airshow. Italian search and rescue helicopters have been stationed in Malta since 1982

- Foreign relations of Italy
- Foreign relations of Malta
- Italian irredentism in Malta
- Accession of Malta to the European Union
- Malta–NATO relations
- European Union–NATO relations
