= 1875 Maltese general election =

- 1–4 December 1875

General elections were held in Malta between 1 and 4 December 1875.

== Background ==
The elections were held under the 1849 constitution, which provided for an 18-member Government Council, of which ten members would be appointed and eight elected.

== Results ==
A total of 2,570 people were registered to vote, of which 2,047 cast votes, giving a turnout of 80%.

Elected members
Name	Votes	Notes
Ramiro Barbaro	585	Re-elected
Salvatore Cachia Zammit	680	Re-elected
Filippo Curmi Cecy	141	Elected from Gozo
Dun Emmanuel Debono	585	
Carlo Maria Muscat	508	
Agostini Naudi	565	
Sigismondo Savona	648	
Ruggerio Sciortino	518	Re-elected
Source: Schiavone, pp176–177
