= Ġużè Muscat Azzopardi =

Maltese lawyer, poet, novelist and social commentator (1853–1927)

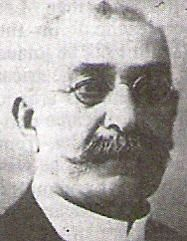
- Born: 1 September 1853; Ħal Qormi, Malta
- Died: 4 August 1927 (aged 73); Valletta, Malta
- Occupations: Lawyer, poet, novelist and social commentator.

Ġużè Muscat Azzopardi (1 September 1853 – 4 August 1927) was a Maltese lawyer, poet, novelist and social commentator. He studied in the Mdina Seminary, and in the University of Malta, where he graduated as a lawyer in 1875. He was married to Tonina Fenech, and they had five sons who survived childhood: Ugo Giorgio (1890-1952), Pio Oscar k/a Oscar (1892-1935), Ivo (1893-1965), Ġino (1899-1982), who were both writers, and Pio (1903-1945). They also had two other children: Leo Isaia (1888-1888) and Maria Lea (1897-1900). He was the uncle of composer Anton Muscat Azzopardi (1903-1979), son of his brother Lorenzo.

== Personal and social life ==
Muscat Azzopardi was an orator, a politician, a theatrical critic, a journalist and an active participant in socio-cultural circles. He was also a lawyer, becoming President of the Chamber of Advocates; he was a member of the governmental Giunta Teatrale. Muscat Azzopardi promoted actively Maltese drama, and was an editor of a number of periodicals, such as In-Naħla Maltija (1878) and Il-Ħabib (1911), and he also contributed to other publications, such as Id-Dawl (1892) and Il-Ħabbar Malti.

Ġużè Muscat Azzopardi was a member of the Council of Government, and also set up the Għaqda Kittieba tal-Malti (which later on became the Akkademja tal-Malti). In 1920 he was elected as its first president, an honour he kept until his death. In 1924 he became the first editor of Il-Malti, the periodical of the said association. For a period of time he was also the examiner for the Italian language at University and in the Seminary.

For his writings and religious activities, he was honoured twice by Pius X, the first time being decreed the Pro Ecclesia et Pontefice, while he was also given the Bene Merenti medal.

In light of his many contributions in prose and poetry within Maltese literature, Franġisk Saverju Caruana called him ‘the Father of Maltese Literature’. His literary works include novels, poems, plays, biographies and translations. His first work in prose was the Life of Saint George (1874), which was a translation from Italian.

Ġużè Muscat Azzopardi was heavily involved in socio-cultural life, so much so that in 1875, when he still was 22 years old, he was listed as Secretary of the Soċjeta Filarmonika Pinto of Ħal Qormi. Five years later, in 1880, he wrote the verses of the first hymn to Saint George, the patron of his town. He was again President of the said society from 1906 to 1917. His love and appreciation of culture, as well as his versatility, showed clearly on March 26, 1907, when the Banda Pinto performed a programme of funeral music. In his speech, Muscat Azzopardi addressed Mro. Ġanni Gatt, who composed the hymn mentioned above.

== Muscat Azzopardi the novelist ==
Muscat Azzopardi was a powerful novelist. In his historical novels Toni Bajjada (1878), Mattew Callus (1878), Vicu Mason (1881), Susanna (1883), Ċejlu Tonna (1886), Ċensu Barbara (1893) and Nazju Ellul (1909), he uses the past in its historical application. In his romantic style, the story becomes an indication of the future, and the novelist mixes both element of nationalism with an invented story. The binding of history (which requires research) with fiction (which requires imagination) strives to both teach and entertain. Muscat Azzopardi fills his stories with direct narration, since his stories are based on action, description, exhortation and explicit instruction. However, characters can be seen to lack psychological development, so the reader is bound to understand characters through their actions, and not through a developed sense of personality.

== Muscat Azzopardi as a poet ==
Muscat Azzopardi was also a leading poet, who experimented with the flexibility of Maltese as a means of poetic expression. Most of his poems are found in the ’Ġabra ta’ Poeżiji bit-Taljan u bil-Malti (1876), Ħamsin poeżija bil-Malti (1890) and Ġabra sħiħa ta’ Sunetti bi Studju fuqhom tal-Kittieb Innifsu (1956). His poetry took many valid elements from the surrounding ambience and the social interpretation presented was many a times of direct inspiration to other poets. Due to his ethic sense he never forgot his mission as a literary educator; even his poetry is frequently didactic.

Ġużè Muscat Azzopardi, along with other minor writers like Ludovik Mifsud Tommasi, Richard Taylor, Anton Muscat Fenech, Dwardu Cachia and Manwel Dimech, inherited the poetic testament of Ġan Anton Vassallo that built his poetry on three principal cornerstones: sentimentality, satire and nationalism. The writers named above succeeded in their work of opening up the democratic orientation of the Maltese nation, while they widened their fields of inspiration by understanding more the social structures and cultural modes. They also continued in their literary discussions, always in light of the models of popular speech. The following is an extract from Muscat Azzopardi's poem Il-Baħar, witnessing his peculiar style of writing:

Mita, fis-sajf, kif jisbaħ,
Nixref mit-tieqa tiegħi,
Biex nara l-mewġ ta’ taħti
Stenbaħx biċ-ċiera miegħi;

U nilmħu donnu ġelu
Magħqud bit-trab tan-nir,
Bil-qlugħ tad-dgħajjes ħierġa
Bħal qatgħa gawwi kbir;

Mita, kif l-ewwel dija
Tax-xemx tibda tleqq fuqu,
Narah jitħarrek – donnu
ħass ’il xi ħadd isuqu;

u mal-blatiet tal-plajja,
bin-nida tiegħu xeheb,
qalb il-bokok tal-fidda
ifawwar jut tad-deheb;

mita narah, bil-qima
tal-maħbubin mistura,
jersaq lejn l-art, ibusha...
u jarġa’ jwarrab lura;

nifhem, f’dik is-sbuħija,
li xejn m’aħna l-bnedmin;
u nħoss il-bżonn li ngħajjat;
Alla, kemm int ħanin!

== Muscat Azzopardi as a translator and playwright ==
Translations by Muscat Azzopardi include Pawlu Xara (1879), L-Għarusa tal-Mosta (1879), Il-Ħalliel it-Tajjeb (1901), Il-Quddiesa (1902) and Storja ta’ Malta (1903) from Italian and Il-Għasar tal-Madonna (1878), Il-Missal (1918), the gospels according to San Mattew (1895), San Mark (1915), San Luqa (1916), San Ġwann (1917) and L-Ktieb ta’ l-Appostli ta’ San Luqa (1924) from Latin. Muscat Azzopardi wrote many plays, some of them originals, other translated from Italian.
