= Partito Popolare =

Partito Popolare Partit Popolari
- Leader: Sigismondo Savona (1895–1898); Ignazio Panzavecchia (1898–1925)
- Founder: Sigismondo Savona
- Founded: 1895
- Merged into: Maltese Political Union
- Newspaper: Malta Għada Tagħna (1895–1908)
- Ideology: Maltese nationalism; Conservatism

The Partito Popolare (PP, Italian for "Popular Party" or "People's Party") was a political party in the Crown Colony of Malta during the late 19th and early 20th centuries.

It was founded on 2 June 1895 by Sigismondo Savona, a former leader of the Unionist Party and the Reform Party. Other political figures involved in the party's founding were Giuseppe Bonavia, Cesare Darmanin, and Giovanni Vassallo, whom were supportive of Savona, and Canon Ignazio Panzavecchia, Antonio Dalli, Andrea Pullicino, and Ernesto Manara. Manara was previously a critic of Savona. The 1895 general election was won by the PN with Panzavecchia being defeated by Alfredo Mifsud as an ecclesiastical representative. This election proved the PP to be a prominent political force since it challenged the PN's power especially when Sigismondo Savona led the poll amongst common electors. The main reasons behind the party's rapid rise were due to Savona's stance on taxation and his ultranationalist views with regards the Maltese language and Malta's nationhood. In contrast with Fortunato Mizzi and the PN, Savona was able to identify with the Maltese speaking population who did not speak neither English nor Italian. In fact, Savona clashed with the Chamber of Advocates when in 1896 he proposed the Maltese language to be used in the law courts.

It acted independently between its founding in 1895 and Savona's retirement from politics in 1898, after which, under the leadership of Panzavecchia, its adherents gradually came to operate mostly in conjunction with the Democratic Nationalist Party in elections and within the Council of Government, especially after Panzavecchia emerged as the leader of the combined movement in 1910. Following the granting of the 1921 constitution, Panzavecchia formed the Maltese Political Union, and his list included former PP adherents, including Antonio Dalli. It would win the largest number of seats in Malta's first Parliament in 1921.

During Savona's leadership, the People's party main political positions were a demand for self-government and support for a marriage ordinance declaring invalid all marriages involving at least one Catholic party, contracted in Malta and not officiated by a Catholic priest. Mizzi's Democratic Nationalist Party at that stage still supported the 1887 constitution, and offered only limited support for Savona's and the local Church's position on the marriage question. Savona's retirement from politics in 1898 was in reaction to repeated refusals by the Council of Government to pass the marriage ordinance.

Its support came largely from the working class, and Panzavecchia's hometown, Senglea, was considered to be a PP stronghold. It was also backed by a Maltese newspaper, Malta Tagħna, and by an English language newspaper, Public Opinion.
