= Marjanu Vella =

Maltese poet

Marjanu Vella, O.F.M. (14 December 1927 – 25 February 1988) was a poet born in Tas-Sliema, Malta in 1927. His primary education was taken at Stella Maris College, a private school, then for his secondary studies attended the Malta Lyceum. He obtained the Matriculation Certificate in Maltese and Italian. At the age of 18 he entered the Franciscan order in Malta and eventually was ordained Priest in August 1952.

The first sign of his future career began when he was still a young student at the Lyceum in 1941. There he wrote his first poem. Fr. Marjanu wrote also prose and other poems which were published in "Lehen il-Malti". Other poems were published in an anthology edited by Professor Guze Aquilina. Between 1952 and 1964 he published eight biographies. Many of them had their second print.

In 1958 he published his first book of poems entitled "Gizimin ahmar" (Red Jasmine). This served as a textbook for state and private schools. In 1969 followed his second publication of poems called "Dghajjes tal-karti" (Paper boats). His poetic career continued in 1975 by the publication of a series of poems named "Hitan tas-sejjieh" (Countryside Walls) which merited him the Rotmans 1975 Prize and was chosen as the test book for the Matriculation exam. His fourth book of poems has the name "Gargir mall-Herza" (wild herb with a kerb). In September 1984 the Maltese Literature Academy acknowledged his contributions and was accepted as a member. His last volume of poems was "Qoffa rih" (A Basket of wind) which was published in 1985. His poems and prose were published in various magazines.

In 1985 Vella wrote and published an "Oratorjo Madonna tas-Sacro Cuor" (Oratorio Our Lady of the Sacred Heart) and another one "Demm fuq il-Verna" (Blood on mount Alvernia) which both were put to music by Professor Joseph Vella and were performed on different occasions. These two oratorios together with other poems and sonnets, that were written during his stay in hospital, were published after his demise in 1989 with the name "Demm fuq il-Verna" (Blood on mount Alvernia). Quite a good number of his poems were translated in Italian and English. He died on 25 February 1988.
