= Patri Fidiel =

Maltese writer

Patri Fidiel (1762–1824) was a Capuchin, author of poems about religious aspects and with a popular traditional versification. Patri Fidiel was one of founders that produce the short prayers in Maltese language, this can be seen in his two short prayers the Ta' L-Ispirtu Sant (Of The Holy Ghost) and Tal-Kunċizzjoni (Of The Immaculate Conception). Another popular Fidiel's poem is Lejna Ħares O Ħanina (Look at us Merciful Lady).
