= Rowsell-Julyan-Keenan Commission =

British Royal commission

The Rowsell-Julyan-Keenan Commission was a Royal Commission in 1878. It was based on a report by Patrick Keenan, Penrose Julyan and Francis William Rowsell, the latter was made British commissioner of ceded Daira lands, Egypt, that year, and had been director of naval contracts, admiralty since 1873 and commissioner for inquiry relating to courts of justice 1873–4, and to Government of Malta 1877–8.

The reports dealt separately with the administrative, political, cultural and economic-fiscal problems, and suggested reforms which were required to secure the proper functioning of Malta's strategic facilities. From the resulting recommendations, the need for a modern fiscal system, which would increase local revenue through a more socially equitable system of taxation, was considered crucial for the process of modernising Malta. It also recommended in its report the Anglicisation of the educational and judicial systems. While the latter had to wait until the 20th century, teaching of the English language started to be enforced in State schools at the expense of Italian. In 1911, English overtook Italian as the secondary language after Maltese, spoken by 13.1% of the population vs. 11.5%. The Royal Commission's report also had significant political impact. Supporters and opponents organised themselves into a Reform and Anti-Reform parties which, apart from being the forerunners of the present day two main political parties in Malta, assumed respectively the anglophile and Italophile imprint (and also, subsequently, pro-colonial and anti-colonial policies) that were to characterise them for decades to come.

== See also ==
- Crown Colony of Malta
- Italian irredentism in Malta
