= Ludovik Mifsud Tommasi =

Maltese priest and educator (1796–1879)

Ludovik Mifsud Tommasi (1796–1879), also known as Ludovico Mifsud Tommasi, was a Maltese priest and educator, and also author of short poems and short prayers. He was from Cospicua, in southeastern Malta. One of the major works of Mifsud Tommasi, L-Inni Imkaddsa (The Holy Hymns), a bilingual Latin-Maltese book, shows that his work focused on traditional aspects with the story concentrated with religious scenes. The book includes four of the five hymns of Thomas Aquinas. Other important works are Stabat Mater Dolorosa; Christe Sanctorum decus Angelorum; and Magnae Deus Potentiae.

Mifsud Tommasi was a proponent of using the Latin alphabet instead of the Arabic script for Maltese. This was a fraught issue at the time over how to incorporate sounds in Maltese, that could not be differentiated in the Latin alphabet; Mifsud Tommasi proposed representing the voiceless pharyngeal fricative with an h, although the eventually accepted form was ħ.
