= Ġan Anton Vassallo =

Maltese poet (1817–1868)

- Born: 6 June 1817; Valletta, Malta
- Died: 28 March 1868 (aged 50) age 51; Valletta, Malta
- Education: University of Malta
- Occupations: Lawyer; poet; novelist

Ġan Anton Vassallo (6 June 1817 – 28 March 1868) was a Maltese writer, poet, and professor. Although he wrote a large amount of literary works, he is best remembered for his poem Tifħira lil Malta.

He was taught by many famous teachers, amongst them Dun Pietru Pawl Psaila and Dun Ġużepp Zammit Brighella. He was fluent in Maltese, Italian, Latin, French, Arabic, and English. Vassallo started a course of Laws in the University of Malta in 1839, finishing it three years later. In 1850 he began teaching Italian in the Liċeo, becoming Professor of Italian at University in 1863.

He began writing poetry in Maltese when he was 25 years old. he wrote many biographies of Maltese personalities in the magazine Arte (1862-1866), and he published his work on the history of Malta, La Storia di Malta raccontata in Compendio in 1854. This version was rewritten in Maltese as Storja ta’ Malta in 1862. He also wrote numerous religious works, such as Il-ħajja ta’ l-Appostlu Missierna San Pawl (1858), and Ġesù Kristu fid-Dinja (1861). His most remembered works refer to his poems, published in two books, one named Ħrejjef (1861). the other Ħrejjef u Ċajt bil-Malti in 1863. His most famous novel is the epic Il-Ġifen Tork, written in 1842. This long poem was translated into Esperanto by Dr Carmel Mallia with the title: "La Turka Ĉefgalero" and was included in the "Antologio de Maltaj Poetoj" (Anthology of Maltese Poets). Mallia translated and published in 1985.

Vassallo's poetic thoughts are divided in two: on one side, there is writing for moral goodness, while on the other-hand there is writing for the pleasure of literature. His works were hence suspended between moral ethics and pleasure. However, between ethics and pleasure Vassallo understood that the most important thing was the effect coming from the pleasure of reading literature, since according to him, if literature did not bring any ethical advancement, then it is there for nothing.

Ġan Anton Vassallo used both Maltese and Italian as tools for teaching. He supported the Maltese spoken in the towns, as that would make sufficient and rich enough for its common use, so as you be able to use it to explain all concepts in social life.

Vassallo died on 29 March 1868 and is buried in the Carmelite church in Valletta.

Vassallo's poems were collected and published for the first time in 2013.
